= Culture of Tunisia =

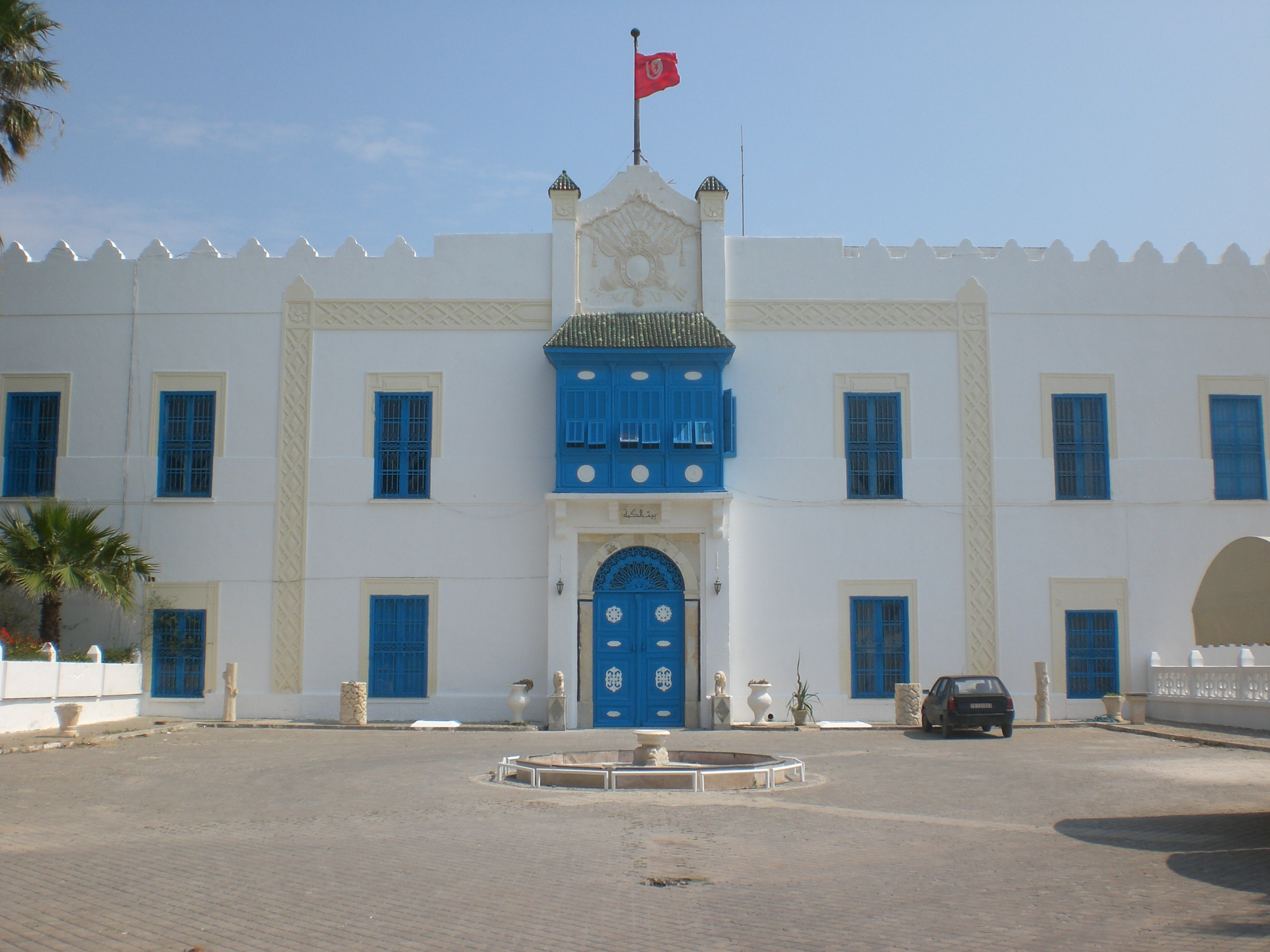
Beit El-Hikma Foundation, Tunis-Carthage

Tunisian culture is a product of more than three thousand years of history and an important multi-ethnic influx. Ancient Tunisia was a major civilization crossing through history; different cultures, civilizations and multiple successive dynasties contributed to the culture of the country over centuries with varying degrees of influence. Among these cultures were the Carthaginian – their native civilization, Roman (Roman Africans), Vandal, Jewish, Christian, Arab, Islamic, Turkish, and French, in addition to native Amazigh. This unique mixture of cultures made Tunisia, with its strategic geographical location in the Mediterranean, the core of several civilizations of Mare Nostrum.

The history of Tunisia reveals this rich past where different successive Mediterranean cultures had a strong presence. After the Carthaginian Republic, the Roman Empire came and left a lasting effect on the land with various monuments and cities such the El-Jem Amphitheater and the archaeological site of the ancient city of Carthage, which is classified as a World Heritage Site, one of eight found in Tunisia.

After a few centuries of the presence of Christianity, represented by the Church of Africa, the Arab Islamic conquest transformed the whole country and founded a new city called Al-Qayrawan, a renowned center for religious and intellectual pursuits.

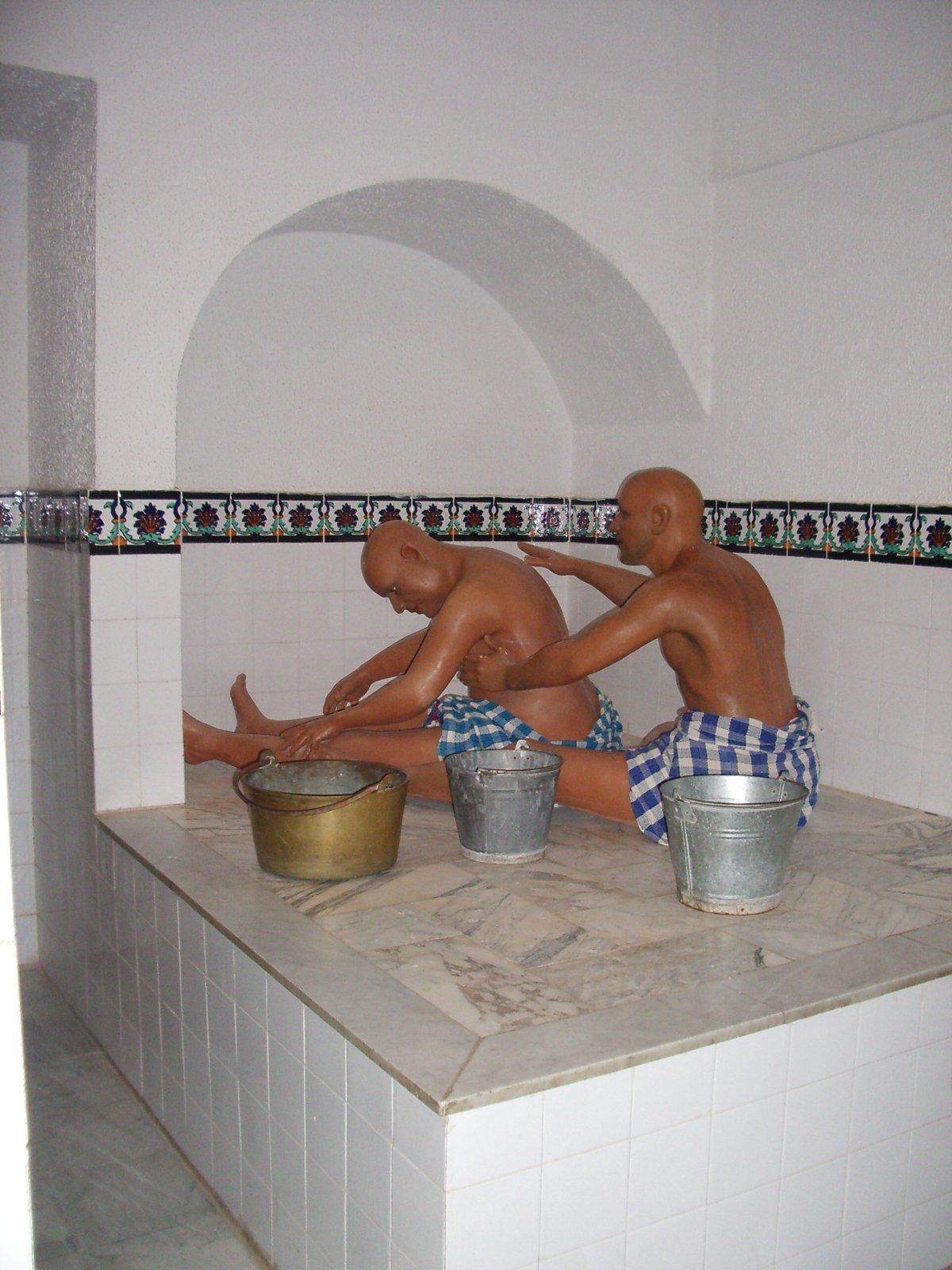
Reconstruction of a traditional steam bath

With the annexation of Tunisia by the Ottoman Empire, the center of power shifted from Tunis to Istanbul. This shift in power allowed the local government of the new Ottoman Province to gain more independence, which was maintained until the institution of the French Protectorate (which was later seen as occupation). The protectorate introduced elements of French culture.

The important elements of Tunisian culture are diverse and represent a unique, mixed heritage. This heritage can be experienced first-hand in museums such as the Bardo, city architecture such as Sidi Bou Said or the Medina of Tunis, cuisine such as French cheeses and croissants, music reflecting Ottoman influences, and other areas of Tunisian culture.

== Cultural diversity ==
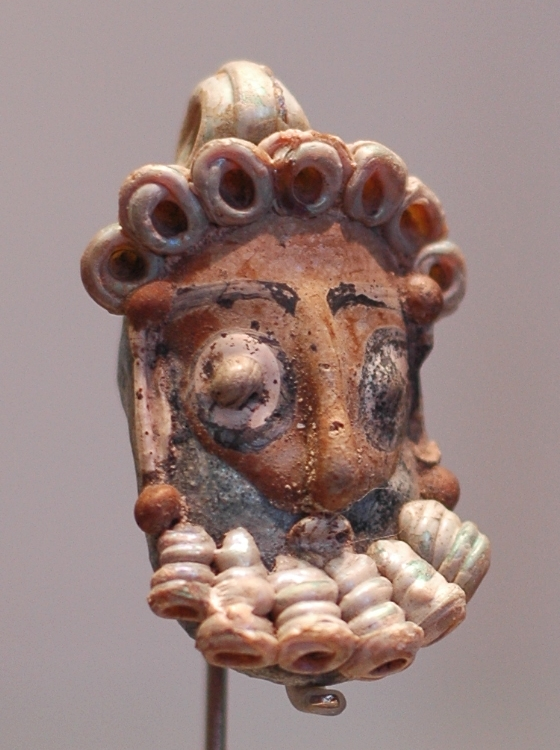
Tunisian amulet

The Encyclopédie 360 describes Tunisia as a country that "did not develop truly original art" but is "strongly marked by various influences and is engrained with monuments which illustrate the various stages of its history ". In his thesis study on Cultural Policy in Tunisia, Rafik Said has mused that, "this relatively small area has produced estates, overlapping of cultures, and a confrontation of morals and doctrines throughout its history. Janice Rhodes Deledalle has referred to Tunisia as "cosmopolitan" and has said that "Tunisia cannot be considered in the category of as other colonies", because of the diversity of cultures embedded in Tunisia's heritage throughout the ages.

=== History ===
Tunisia's cultural life dates to prehistoric times, as illustrated by dolmens near Bou Salem and rock carvings of the Tunisian Sahara. The Hermaïon of El Guettar, discovered near the city of El Guettar in the south, is the oldest extant religious display discovered.

The dawning era of Tunisian cultural history was shaped by Carthaginian influences including Phoenician, Greek. There is much evidence of Phoenician and western artwork and glass work found in Punic tombs, notably in masks which the Phoenician used to drive out evil spirits or demons of death with their decorations, such as the lotus motifs found on many objects or in the artistic design buildings. The paintings and sculptures of the lids of sarcophagi from the necropolis of Carthage and El Alia, the architecture of the mausoleum of Dougga are characterized by the combined influence of Greece and Egypt. In addition, we find a trace of Hellenic influences overlapping Roman and Punic culture. In sculpture found in Tunisia, there has been a distinct, almost symbolic evolution towards a style which is a representative, idealized perfection of a body, state, etc. Greek pottery is also emulated, and it is a fact that potters from Greece were employed to produce objects in Carthage.

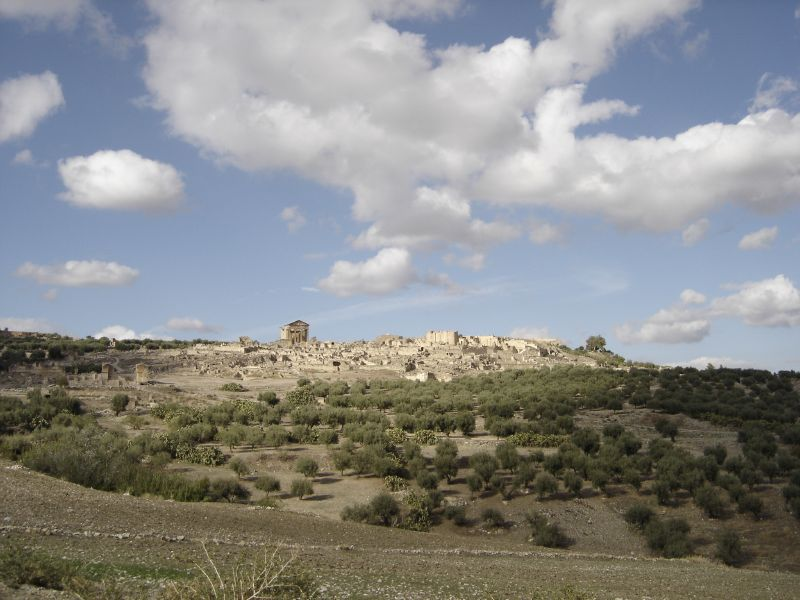
Panorama of Dougga

The works of Roman Tunisia do not differ greatly from those of Europe. Among those handed down to us are Thuburbo Majus, Gigthis, the amphitheater of El Jem, the capital of Dougga, the Baths of Antoninus at Carthage and the Triumphal Arch of Caracalla. Subsequently, when Christianity was founded in Carthage, numerous monuments were erected. The Church in Africa, having been illustrated with famous martyrs such as St. Cyprian of Carthage or bishops as Saint Augustin d'Hippone, grew quickly in prestige. Many Christian monuments are erected including the catacombs of Sousse or the Makthar baptistery. Basilicas in multiple aisles, like St. Cyprian, were built based on the Syrian influences. However, the Church suffered persecution under a long reign of the Vandals who confiscated some of its properties. The arrival of the Byzantines lead to the disappearance of the latter and the restoration of a dense network of Orthodox bishops. During this period, many hills were crowned with Byzantine fortifications, such as in Kélibia.

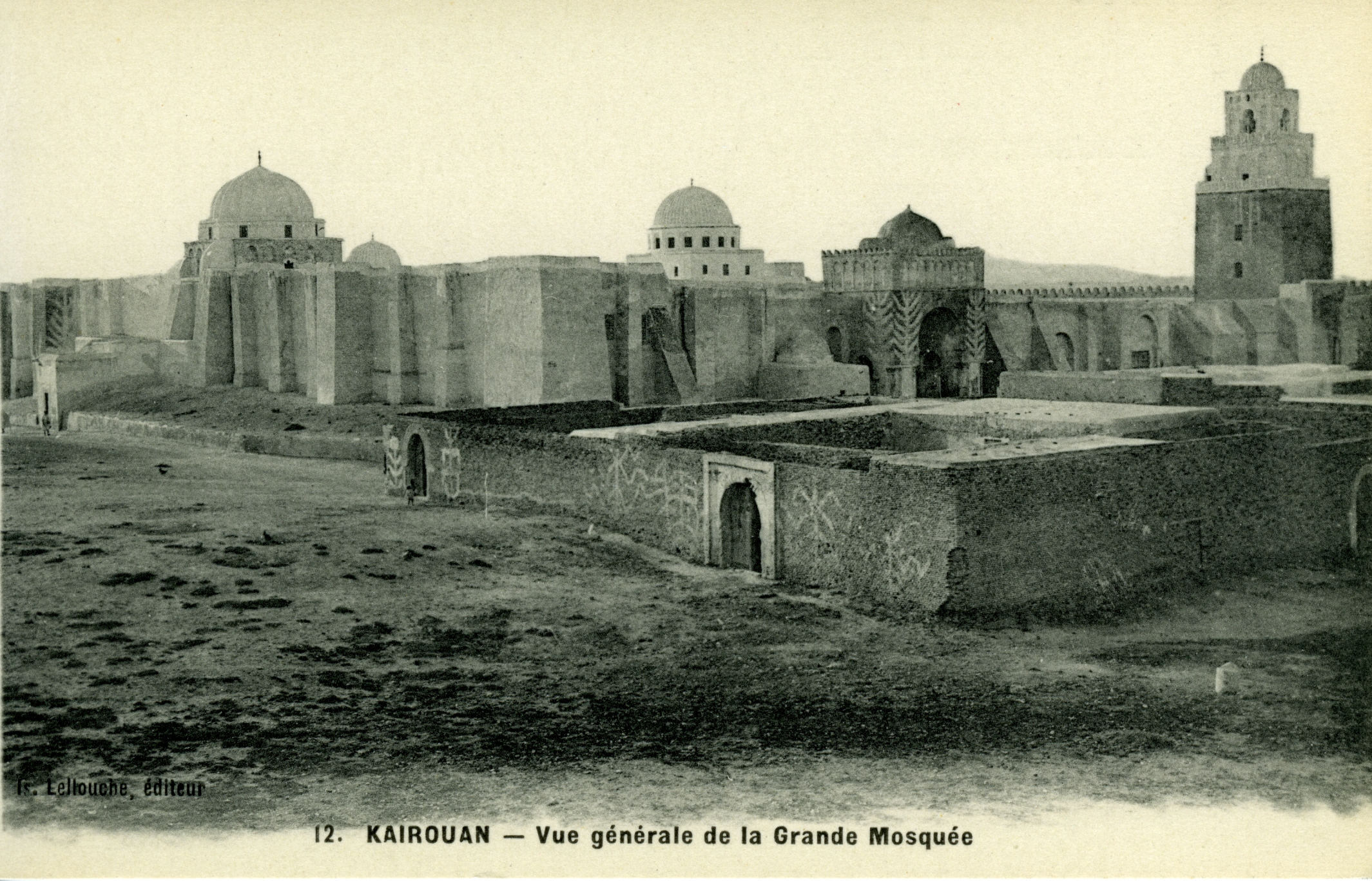
Great Mosque of Kairouan

With the Arab conquest, specifically during the reign of the dynasty Aghlabids, Kairouan became a renowned intellectual center, attracting many scholars. It played an important role in translation and research, particularly in the dissemination of medical science knowledge. In mathematics, contributions to computational algorithms were also made in Kairouan. The Arabs then erected buildings specific to Islamic architecture. While some retain a Byzantine essence, such as Three Doors Mosque in Kairouan (built in the ninth century) or ribat Sousse, many of the ancient columns are purely Arab such as the great Zitouna Mosque of Tunis (ninth century), the Great Mosque of Mahdia and the Great Mosque of Kairouan.

In the fourteenth and fifteenth centuries, poets, scholars, historians increased in number in Tunisia. Zitouna Mosque, in the medina of Tunis housed the first Islamic university, and replaced Kairouan as an active center of intellectuals that included doctors and scholars, such as Ibn Zaïtoun, Ibn Al Abhar, Ibn Al Gafsi and Ibn Arafa. Thanks to scholars like Ibn Khaldun and writers such as Aboul-Qacem Echebbi, Tunisia for centuries became a major cultural center in the Arab-Muslim world and Mediterranean.

During the Turkish conquest in the sixteenth century, mosques, such as that of Sidi Mahrez Mosque in Tunis were erected in a manner to those in Constantinople, although the Zaouias generally retain their north African style in Kairouan.

The French protectorate in turn left its mark on local architecture by adding a new urban style that can be found in the construction of a new city plan juxtaposed against the old medina of Tunis. Heavily influenced by Paris, with the Avenue Bourguiba, the style is known as "Rococo Tunisian ".

The Tunisian revolution brought about important changes to the intersection of art and politics in post-2011 Tunisia.

== Nation ==
The most spoken language is Tunisian Arabic. Other languages include French and Berber. Mediterranean Lingua Franca and Sened are languages that are not spoken anymore. National identity is strong and Tunisian efforts to create a national culture have proved stronger than in the nineteenth century. National culture and heritage is constantly referred to with reference to the country's modern history, in particular, the fight against the French protectorate and the construction of the modern state that followed from the 1950s. This is celebrated through national holidays, in the names of streets recalling historical figures or key dates or the subject of films or documentaries. With the start of the rule of President Zine el-Abidine Ben Ali on November 7, 1987, the official reference to the figure 7 and the theme of "Change" contributes to the perpetuation of that tradition.

=== Flag ===
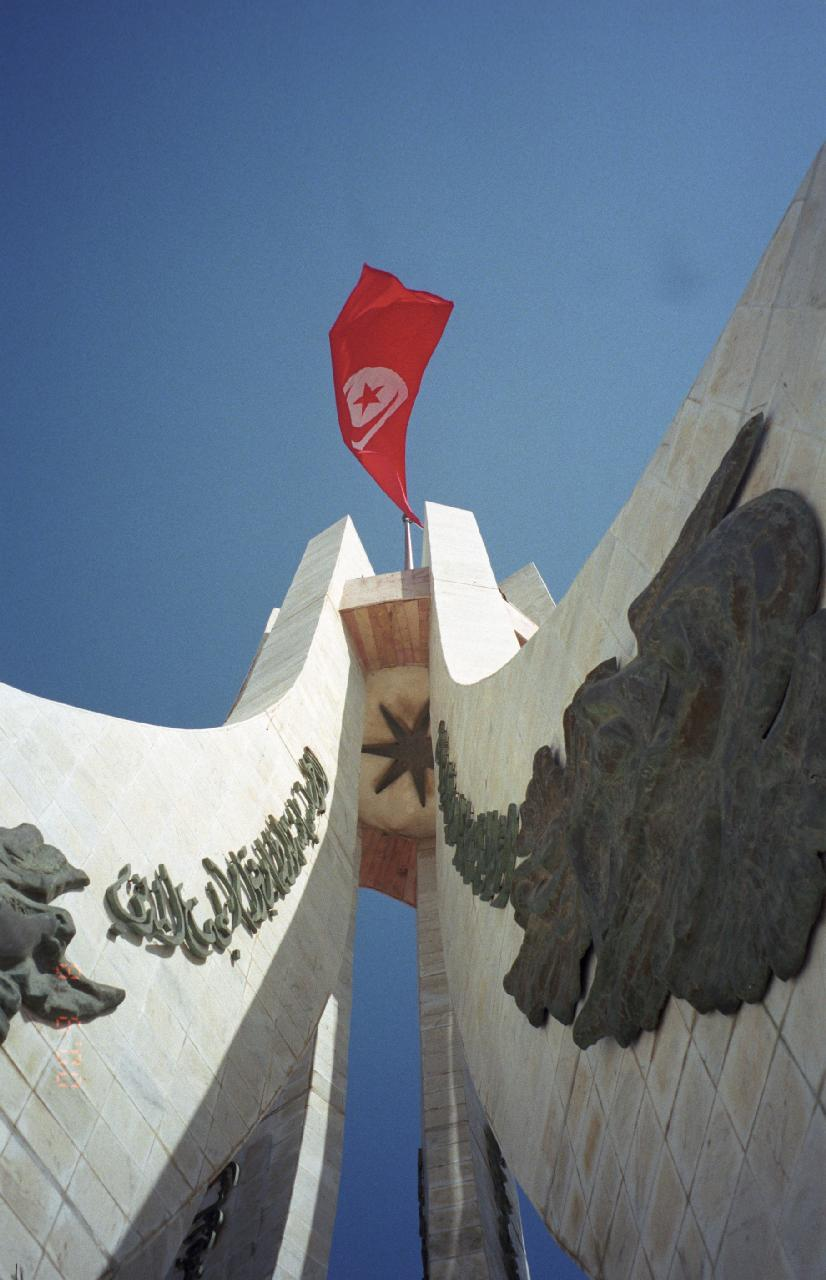
Flag of Tunisia (center)

The national flag of Tunisia is predominantly red and consists of a white circle in the middle containing a red crescent around a five-pointed star. The Bey of Tunis Al-Husayn II ibn Mahmud decided to create the flag after the Battle of Navarino on October 20, 1827, which was adopted in 1831 or 1835. It remained the country's official flag during its time as a French protectorate, and was confirmed as the national flag of the Republic of Tunisia with the signing of the Constitution of Tunisia on June 1, 1959. It was not until June 30, 1999, that its proportions and design were clearly specified in law.

The crescent and star recalls the Ottoman flag and is therefore an indication of Tunisia's history as a part of the Ottoman Empire. It differs from the Turkish flag, however, in the color of the crescent and the position of the star and circle. The crescent is white on the Turkish flag, but red on the Tunisian flag. On the Turkish flag, the star is off-centered, while on the Tunisian flag, the star and circle is located in the center of the flag.

=== Coat of arms ===
As for the national coat of arms, they are officially adopted in 1861 and include revised versions on June 21, 1956, and May 30, 1963. The top has a Carthaginian galley sailing on the sea while the lower part is divided vertically and on the right depicts a black lion seizing a silver scimitar. A banner bears the national motto: "Liberty, Order, Justice".

=== Jasmine ===
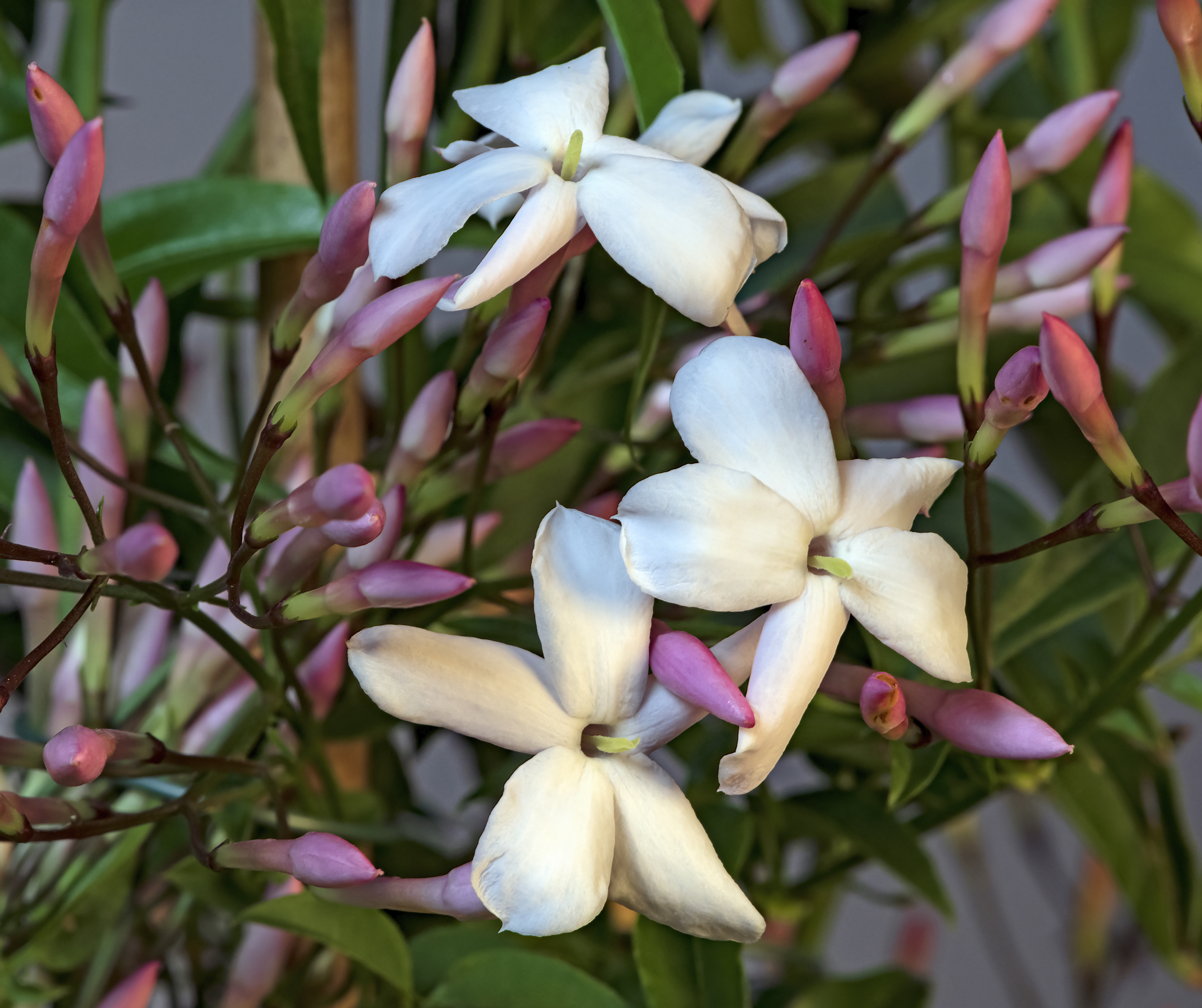
Jasmine

Imported by the Andalusians in the sixteenth century, jasmine has become the national flower of Tunisia. The gathering takes place at dawn and then, upon nightfall, when young boys collect small bouquets, and later sell them to passersby on the street or to motorists stopped at intersections.

Furthermore, jasmine is the subject of a specific sign language. A man who wears jasmine on his left ear indicates that he is single and in addition, offering white jasmine is seen as a proof of love while on the contrary, offering odorless winter jasmine is a sign of insolence.

=== Hamsa ===
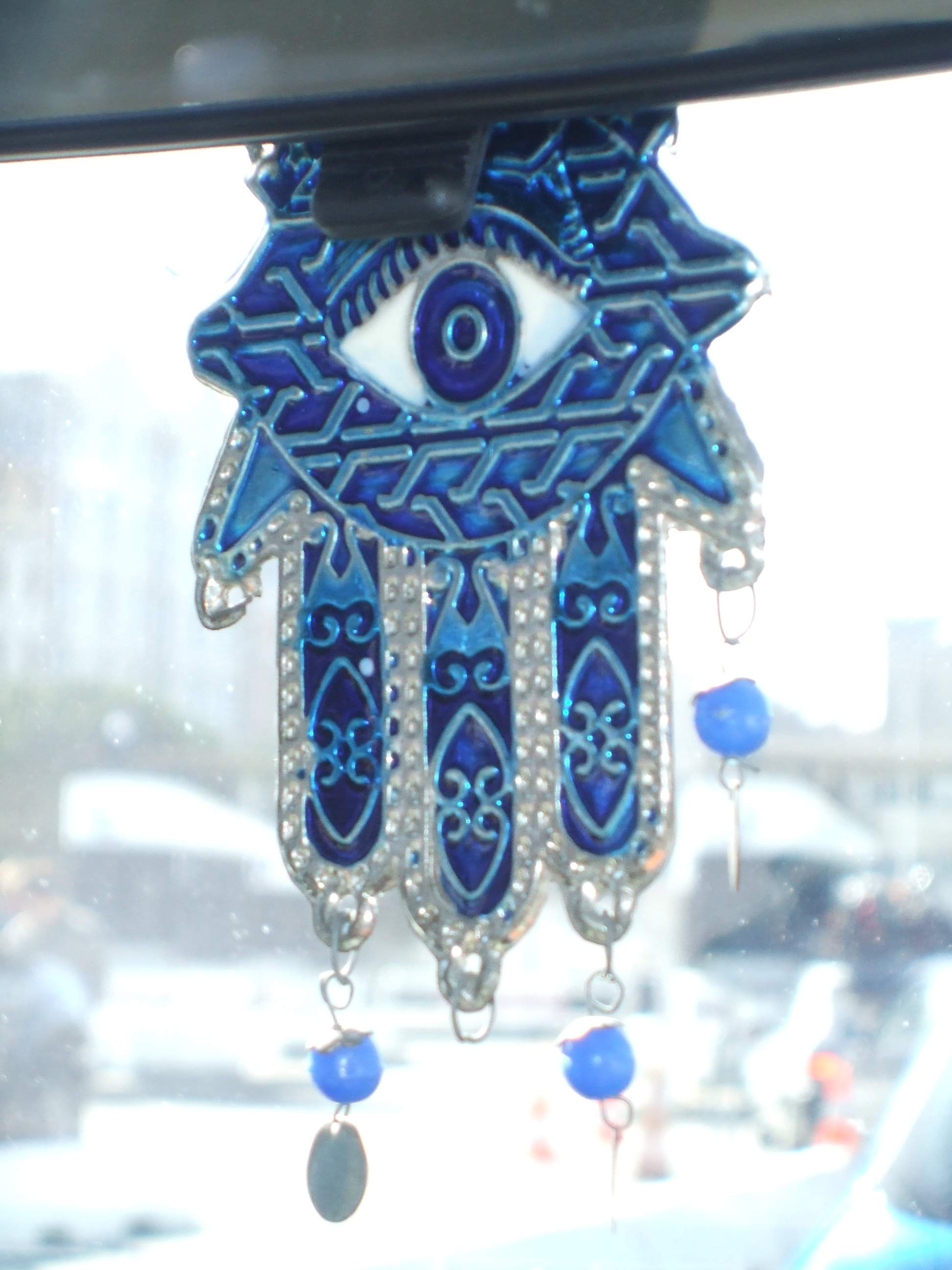
Tunisian hamsa

The hamsa (Tunisian Arabic: خمسة, also romanized khamsa), is a palm-shaped amulet popular in Tunisia and more generally in the Maghreb and commonly used in jewelry and wall hangings. Depicting the open right hand, an image recognized and used as a sign of protection in many times throughout history, the hamsa is believed to provide defense against the evil eye. It has been theorized that its origins lie in Carthage (modern-day Tunisia) and may have been associated with the Goddess Tanit.

=== Sign of Tanit ===
The sign of Tanit is an anthropomorph symbol present on many archaeological remains of the Ancient Carthage civilization. Both the symbol and the name of the goddess Tanit, are still frequently used within Tunisian culture such as with the tradition of Omek Tannou or the grand film prize of the Tanit d'or. Some scholars also relate the name of the capital Tunis and by extant that of the modern country and its people to the Carthaginian goddess Tanith ('Tanit or Tanut), as many ancient cities were named after patron deities.

== Religion ==
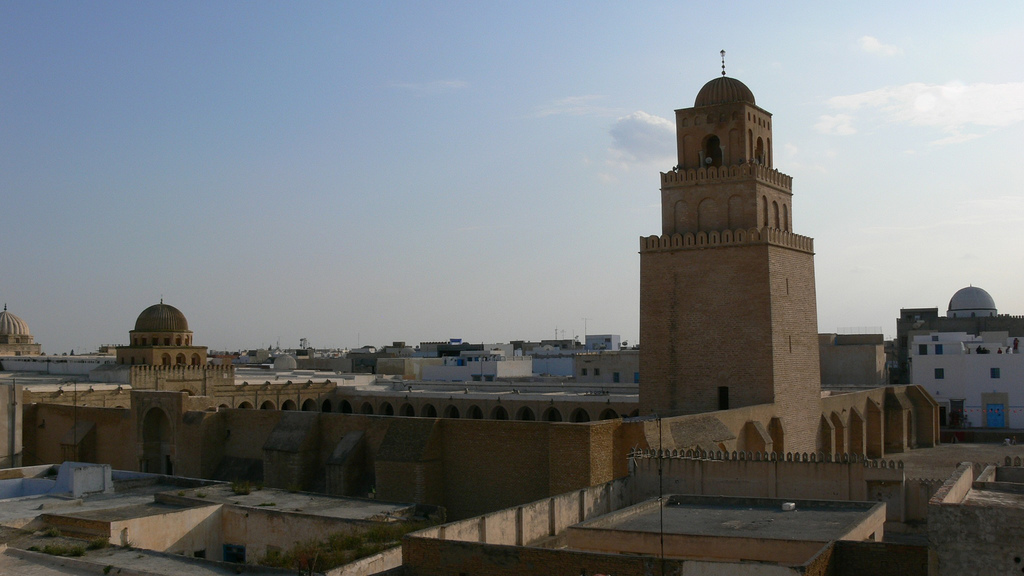
Mosque of Uqba, Kairouan

The Tunisian Constitution provides freedom of thoughts and beliefs, as well as the free exercise of religion, as long as it does not affect public order. The government generally respects this right but do not allow the establishment of political parties based on religion. Muslim religious holidays such as Eid el-Adha, Eid el-Fitr or Mouled are considered national holidays. The government also recognizes the sanctity of religious holidays for non-Muslims, particularly those of the monotheistic religions.

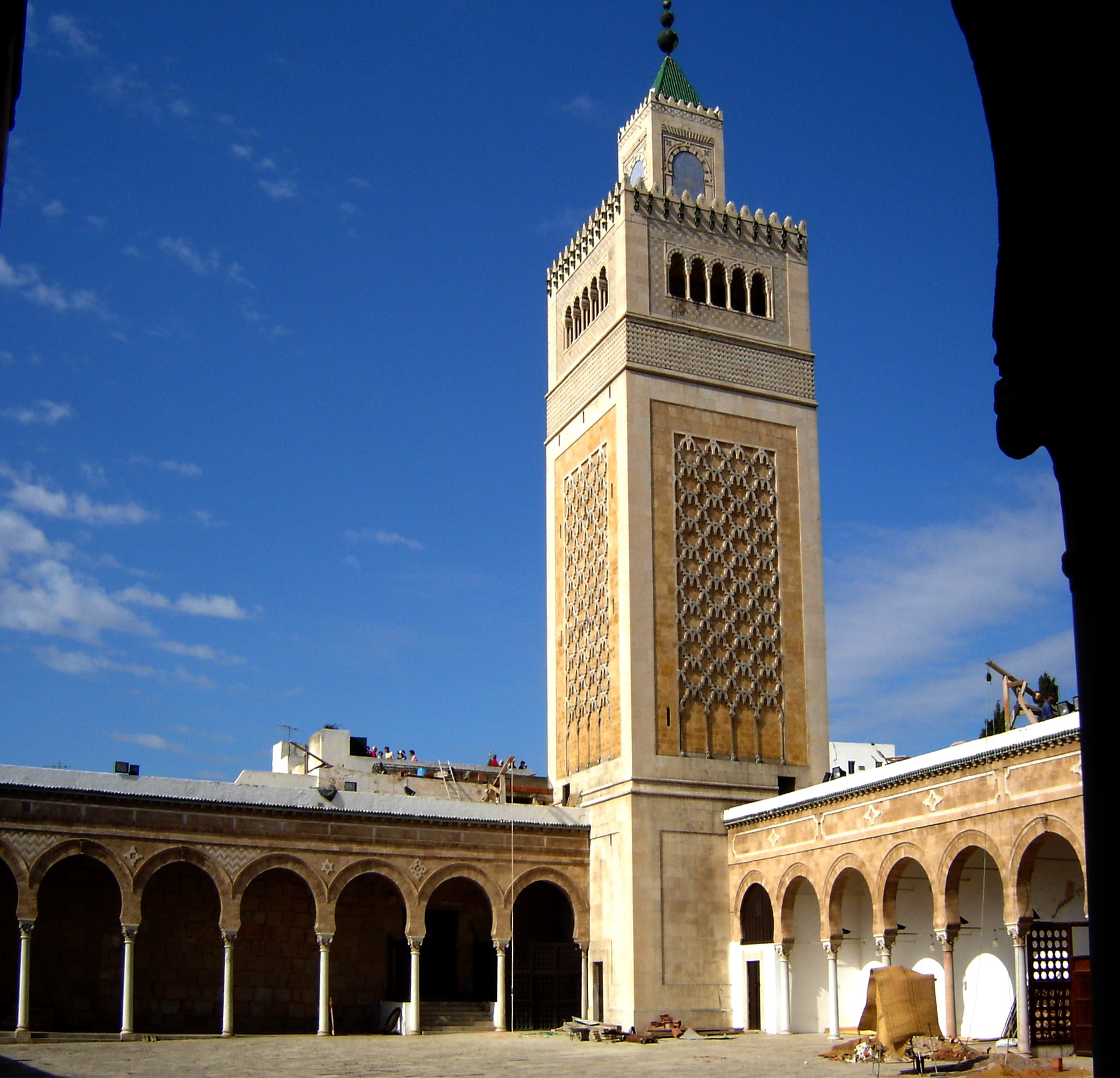
Minaret of Zitouna Mosque

Islam is the main official religion of Tunisia with a rate of around 99% of the population. 99% of Tunisians are Sunni Muslims of the Maliki rite, the rest being attached to the Hanafi school of thought. There is also a small community of Muslim Sufis but there are no statistics regarding its size. The country is also dotted with small white mausoleums scattered in rural and urban areas and called marabouts. These tombs of saints, often male, are usually housed in places such as caves, hills, springs or points on the coast. Through meditation, these characters were supposed to heal the sick and blind. Their graves are still key to the relationship between the human and the divine in the context of festivals bringing together members of a particular community (a village, or extended family or tribe). Today, some Tunisians continue to pray and to ask them for favors.

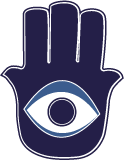
Khamsa symbol against the evil eye

In the 1970s, an Islamist movement, based on close adherence to the Koran and other sacred texts, opposed to some unorthodox practices developed and reached its climax with the formation of a political movement, the Ennahda (Renaissance) in the 1980s. Most of their leaders were arrested or exiled during the 1990s.

Roman Catholics, Jews, Greek Orthodox, and Protestants are some others. These religious groups are promised their rights of practicing their religion by Tunisian government. The country is characterized by its tolerance and openness to other cultures. For instance, the teaching of Islam is compulsory in public schools but the program of religious studies at the secondary level also includes the history of Judaism and Christianity. The Tunisians also retain some native beliefs of Berber origin such as the evil eye. A number of practices, such as shutters painted blue are also used to repel evil spirits.

== Languages ==
Tunisia is homogeneous in terms of language, since nearly all of the population masters French and Arabic (the state Official language) and speaks Tunisian Arabic which is the mother-tongue of almost all Tunisians. Tunisian Arabic is actually a dialect – or more accurately a set of dialects, for which there is no official body of standards. It is established on a berber and punic substratum, influenced by the languages of the people that lived or administered the region, during the course of history, including: Arabic, Turkish, Italian, Spanish and French. Tunisian Arabic is not understood by most Arab speaking countries as it does derive from a mixture of a few languages. Tunisian is spoken mostly in the context of a daily dialogue between Tunisians and within the family. The chelha, meanwhile, is spoken by less than 1% of the population, mainly in the semi-Berber villages of the south, including Chenini, Douiret, Matmata, Tamezrett, etc., and in some villages of the island of Djerba, mainly Guellala/Iquallalen, Ajim, Sedouikech / Azdyuch and Ouirsighen / At Ursighen.

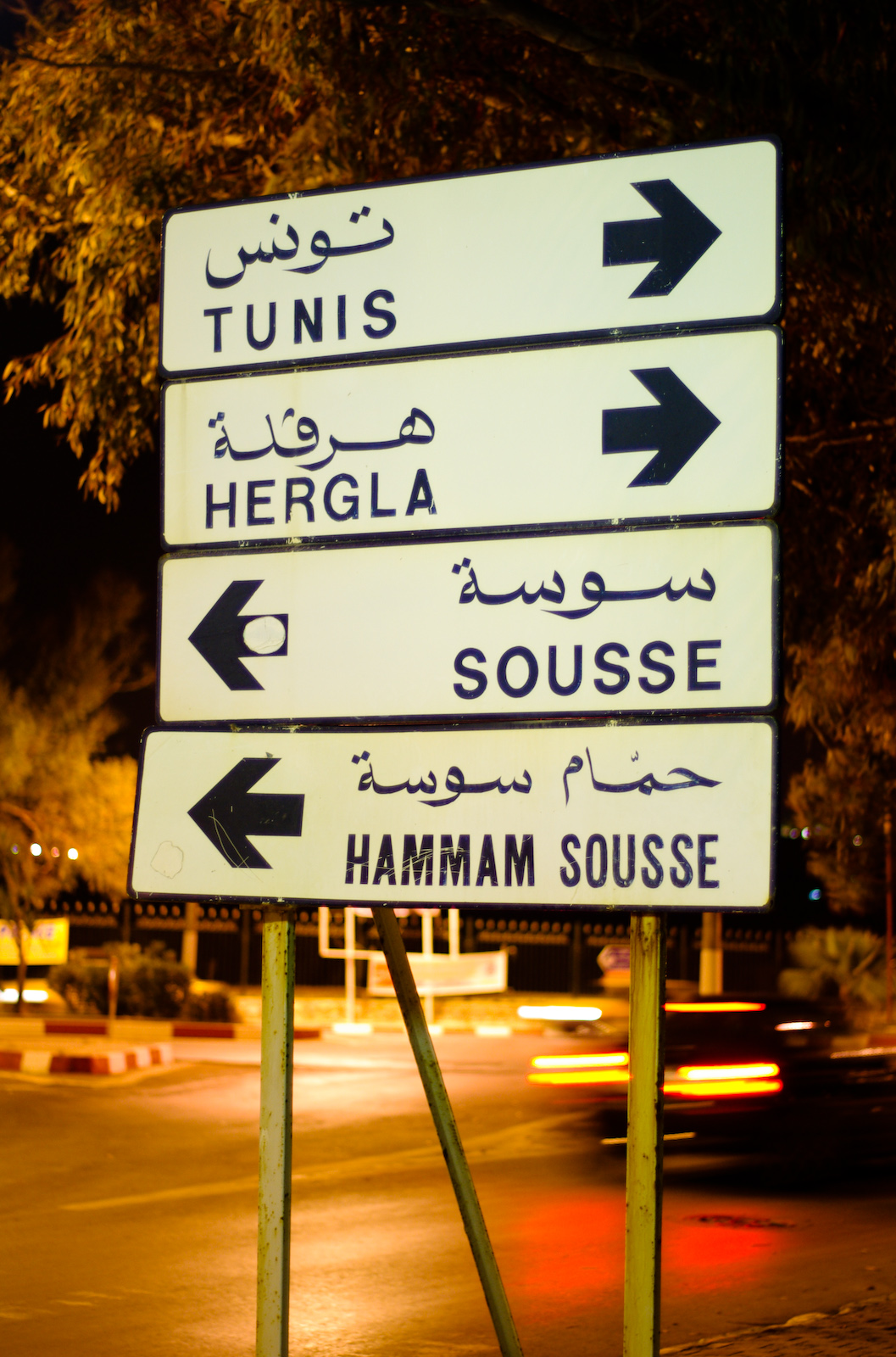
Road signs in Arabic and French

During the French protectorate in Tunisia, the French introduced many institutions, especially in education. These became a strong vehicle for dissemination of the French language, which quickly became a marker of social advancement and openness to more modern and liberal values. From independence, the country gradually became Arabized even if the administration, justice and education had long been bilingual, while the knowledge of European languages had been enhanced by exposure of Tunisia to the continent through television. Visas were introduced by the French minister Charles Pasqua in 1986 for population movements between Tunisia and France. Beginning in October 1999, commercial establishments were forced to give twice the space for Arabic characters as Latin characters. At the same time, the administration of Tunisia was forced to communicate only in Arabic, although only the departments of Defense and Justice and the legislature are actually fully Arabized. Like many other documents produced by the administration, the Official Journal of the Republic of Tunisia, which enacts laws and decrees, is written in Arabic but is translated in French, although this version has no legal value and can not be considered official. In this context, the use of French seemed to be on the decline despite the increased number of graduates of the educational system, which leads to the fact that much of French remains an important social indicator. Since it is widely practiced in the business, the medical world and cultural world, we can even consider that it has gentrified.

Kindergarten and the first three grades of school are taught entirely in Arabic; thereafter, the second cycle of primary and secondary education is half Arabic and half French. English was also taught from the age of 15 from 1970, from the age of 10 from 1994, from the age of 14 from 1997, and from the age of 12 in 2000.

== Education ==
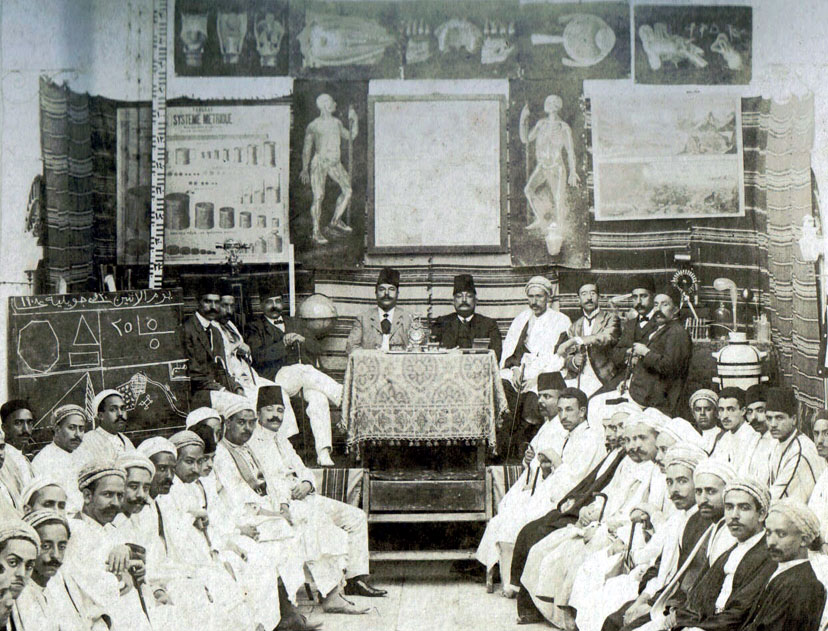
Class of Khaldounia in 1908

=== Development of education ===
There was, until the nineteenth century, no modern state education in Tunisia. There was actually a score of European schools run by religious institutions while traditional learning was taught in the Zaytuna mosque and the kouttab, particularly the religious sciences studied from commentaries on the Qur'an and Sunnah.

The first educational institution of modern Tunisia was the Sadiki College, founded in 1875 by the Grand Vizier Pasha Kheireddine, followed by the Khaldounia School in 1896. In 1956, after independence, began a policy of education reform that was characterized by the unity, the nationalization and the Arabization of the education system. In this context, Habib Bourguiba said in 1958: "Living on the margins of institutions and harassing the protectorate system for recognition of our rights, I told myself that if the government passed into our hands, we'd address primarily the problem of education." This "problem" was so vast that the state gave priority to national education and culture from then on. This is one reason why the Tunisian government specifically created a body dedicated to culture, then called "Ministry of Cultural Affairs and Information". The second reason was the need to separate culture and education, the latter no longer the only means of transmitting culture. The third reason was the responsibility to the nation.

In 1966, as part of increasing political literacy of the workforce, the Institute of Adult Education became responsible for making some 150,000 people literate in a period of five years. It conducted these activities mainly in the productive sectors – agricultural cooperatives, factories, mines and large companies – but also in the craft centres, army, prisons and youth centres. The lessons of this institute include, in addition to reading, writing and arithmetic lessons, geography, history, civics, law, and social and religious education. There are also opportunities provided to take additional courses of vocational training. The length of the main course is two years with five sessions of one hour and a half per day, a total of 450 hours, culminating with a certificate of social education. A third year bilingual course was created in 1968 for those wishing to continue their studies. Some 1,090 people attended this course during the 1968–1969 school year, resulting in the institute being awarded the Mohammad Reza Pahlavi Prize during the third International Day of Literacy, on September 8, 1969, "for decisive contribution to the launch and implementation of a national adult literacy in which is developed, tested and has implemented an effective methodology for literacy and education ".

On December 31, 1966, there were 21 public libraries for children and independent public libraries for adults, the former run by women. Mobile teachers and librarians were employed to ensure the promotion of culture in rural areas, and some 52 centers of literature were established with the purpose of loaning books for home study. This measure was aimed at increasing the development of reading habits into the customs of the Tunisian people.

=== Educational system ===
The non-compulsory preschool education, which is for children 3 to 6 years of age, is provided in kindergartens. Basic education is compulsory and free, from 6 to 16 years, and is divided into two cycles: primary school for the first six years, followed by college for another three years. This course is sanctioned by a diploma of graduation from basic education to enable graduates to access secondary education (always free) taught in high schools for four years after the 1995 reform. Students are then directed to a second cycle of three years with five subjects (letters, science, technology, computer science and economics and management) and sanctioned by the BA for access to higher education. Tunisia has twelve universities – five in Tunis, one in Sousse, one in Sfax, one at Kairouan, one in Gabès, one in Gafsa, one in Monastir and one in Jendouba – but it also has 178 other institutions, including 24 colleges for Technology Studies (ISET) and six higher institutes of teacher training (ISFM).

There are two secondary schools in Tunisia run by the French government: the Lycée Pierre Mendes-France and the Lycée Gustave Flaubert. These apply methods and programs similar to those in France. There is also the American Cooperative School of Tunis, the International School of Carthage, the British International School of Tunis and the Tunis International School. New updates to the educational curriculum have been implemented during the last 20 years, so that it is now qualified to be an international system. 80% of Tunisians hold some kind of degree, almost 66% holding a bachelor's. The penetration rate of education among Tunisian is 87%. Attendance remains strong despite high tuition fees (from 1.400 to 1.800 dinars per year in the cycle). Originally intended to educate the children of expatriates and a Francophile elite, they now attract a majority of Tunisians (over 60% of the 3,000 students today); the Tunisian bourgeoisie, in particular, are attracted by the multicultural courses and the possibility of pursuing higher studies in France. As a result, the Paris Dauphine University is considering opening an office in Tunisia in 2009 to accommodate 1,000 students.

Vocational training is provided by a group of public operators which include the Tunisian Agency for Vocational Training, which provides instructional supervision of all public and private operators. The diplomas issued after an initial training are given at three levels: the certificate of vocational aptitude (CAP) which is a course lasting a minimum of one year after basic education, certification as professional engineer (construction) which is a course lasting a minimum of one year after the first cycle of secondary education after obtaining a CPC, and a higher technical certificate (BTP) from a course lasting a minimum of two years after the baccalaureate or after obtaining the construction certificate.

In 2001, 19.9% of the Tunisian national budget was spent on education. In 2005, the literacy rate was 76.2%, and the enrollment of children 12 to 17 years was 66% among both boys and girls. Access to higher education is 27% of the age group it concerns.

=== Museums ===
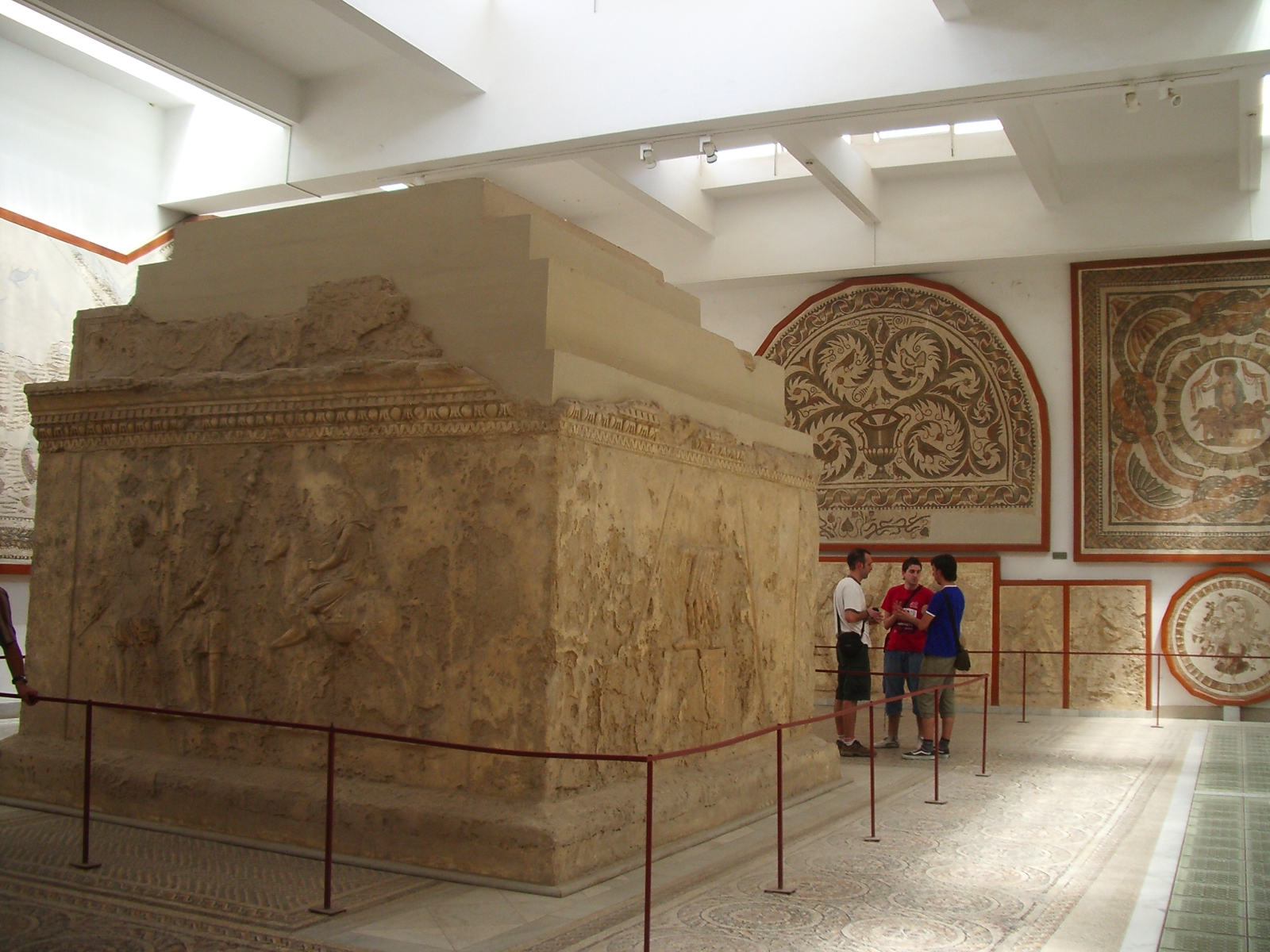
Bardo National Museum

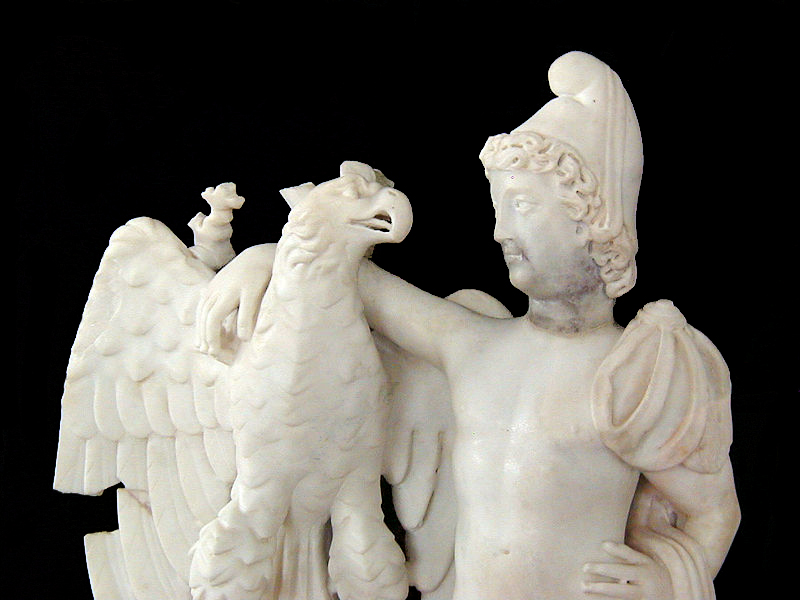
Statuette of Ganymede in the Carthage Paleo-Christian Museum

The Bardo National Museum is one of the largest institutions of its kind in the Mediterranean, consisting of archaeological treasures from over several millennia by many cultures. The museum officially opened on May 7, 1888, and offers one of the finest and largest collections of mosaics of ancient Rome. The Archaeological Museum of Sousse, founded in 1951, has the second largest collection of mosaics after the Bardo. The Oceanographic Museum of Salammbo, with its 11 rooms, is the main Tunisian museum dedicated to the sea. The National Museum of Islamic Art in Tunisia has several collections of pottery, pieces of Korans and calligraphy dating from when Raqqada occupied the Aghlabids capital, from the 9th century.

In the 1970s, a program was implemented in cooperation with UNESCO. It provides four types of museum: museums synthesis, regional museums, local museums and specialized museums. The Bardo Museum is a good example of museum synthesis since this type of museum is expected to house objects from all periods of the history of Tunisia without taking into account the origin of these.

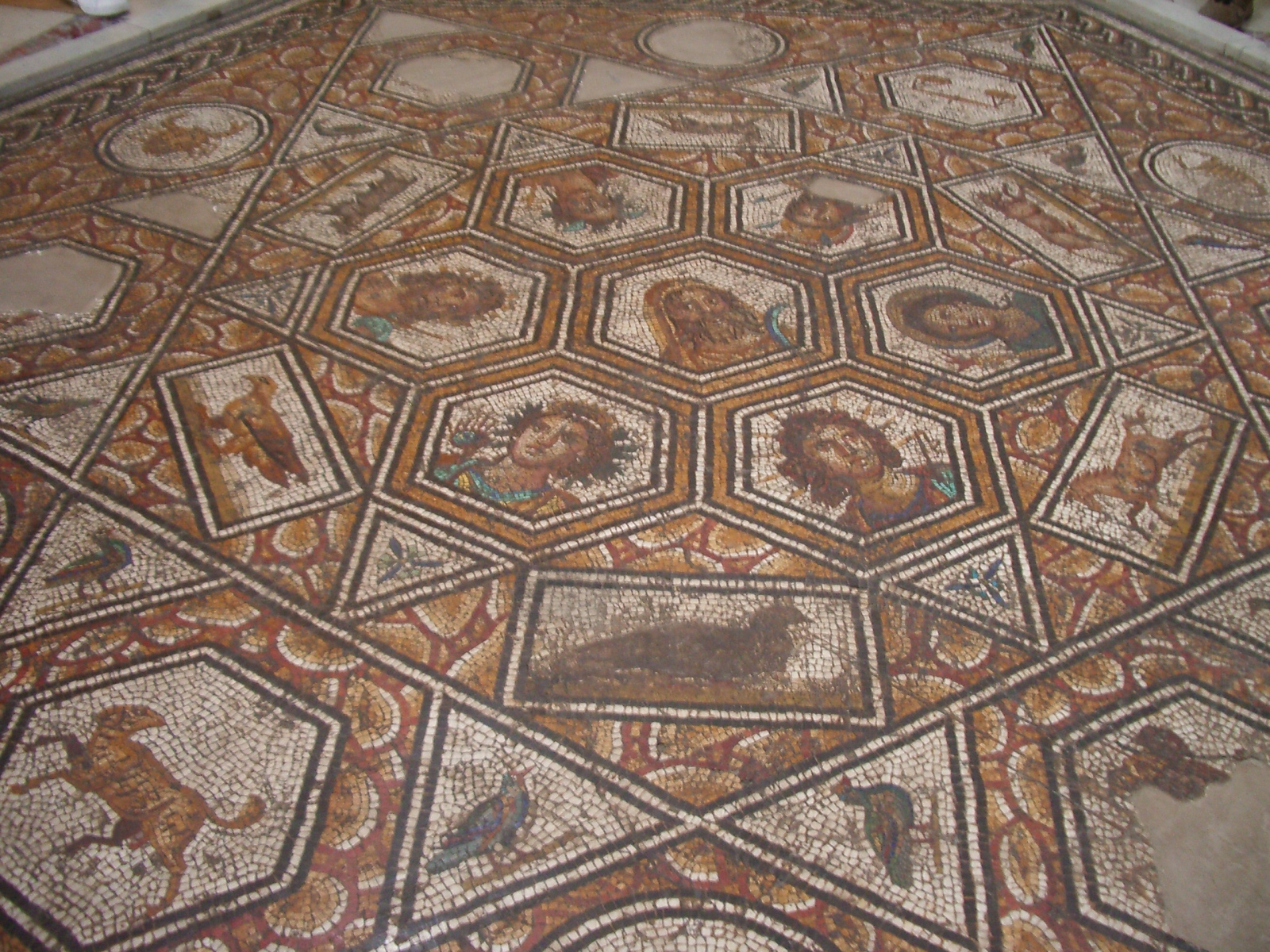
Ancient Roman mosaic in the Bardo Museum

The existence of these museums is justified by the fact that they illustrate the evolution of artistic creation over the civilizations. Regional museums are limited to chief towns and governorates, specializing in the history of each region. As for local museums, they are part of a policy of decentralization of culture to participate through museum education of the masses by encouraging more and more people to visit the museums. Some local museums exist in Makthar, Utica, Carthage and Monastir. Finally, specialized museums themselves can be divided into two other categories of museums: the museums dedicated to a historical period and museums specializing in a given subject. In the first category, there is already the Dar Hussein museum, entirely devoted to the medieval Tunisia. In the second category, two projects were selected: the mosaic museum and a Paleo-Christian museum. The mosaic museum is fully justified by the richness of Tunisia in art museums and provides an evolution both thematically and chronologically on the subject. As for the Paleo-Christian Museum, it is now located in Carthage.

Other specialized museums are also considered as museums of culture and science museums. These are used to trace the history and evolution of technology.

== Arts ==
Most of the country's older art came from the influences of China, Spain, Iran and the Near East forming the style known as Arabesque. Tunisian artists are known for their mosaics and pottery. Their mosaics use a variety of colors in repetitive patterns to adorn walls and floors by depicting a story or person. Mosaics are often used in architecture by implementing the use of geometric shapes and accenting with gold. Though, the displays of some artwork can be seen on buildings and architecture, one could find many sources of art in one place in the Bardo Museum in Tunis.

=== Music ===
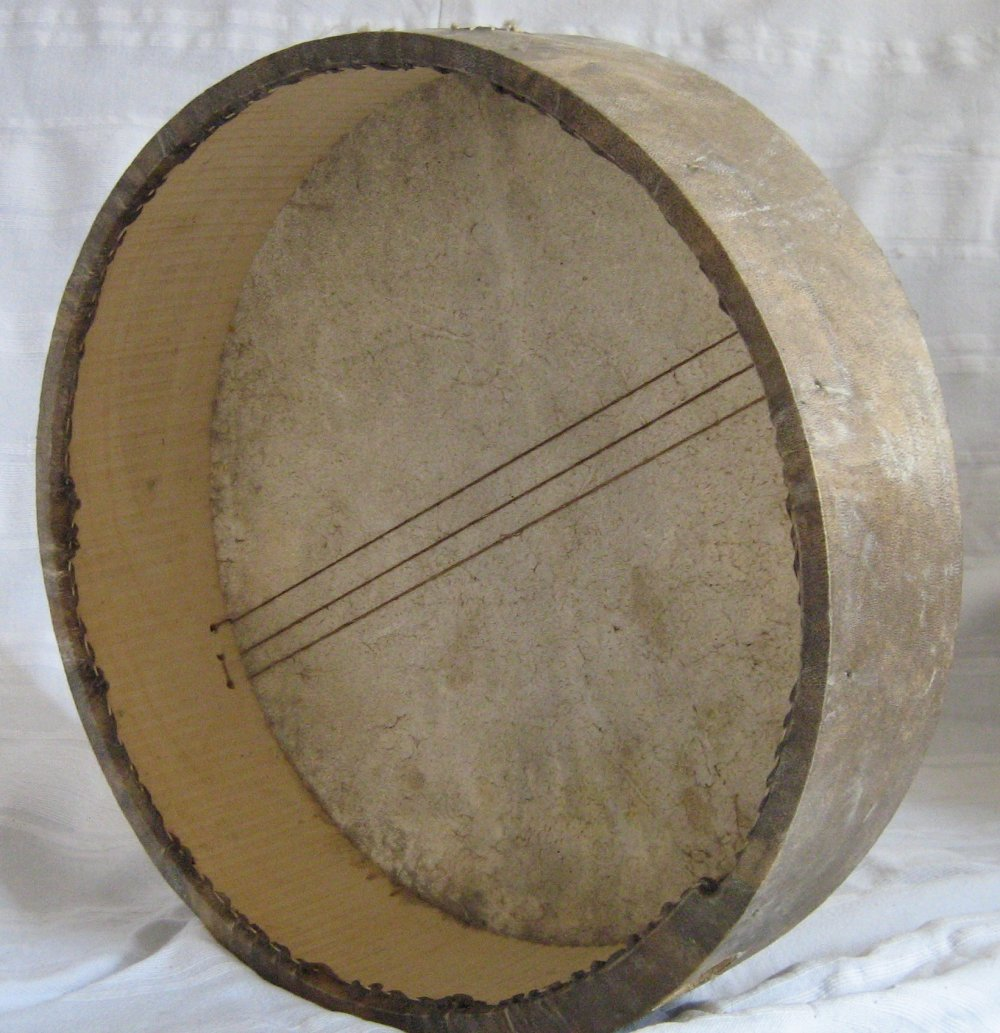
Tunisian Bendir (frame drum) with snare

Tunisian music is the result of a cultural mix. According to Mohammed Abdel Wahab, Tunisian music has also been influenced by old Andalusian songs injected with Turkish, Persian and Greek influences. He believes that the Tunisian music has undergone three phases of outside influences: the first from the East and whose center was in Mecca and Medina, the second coming from Muslim Spain which was the center of Andalusia and the last coming from the Ottoman Empire and whose center was Istanbul. The legacy of its three phases are illustrated respectively in the creation of Tunisian traditional music, the Malouf the introduction of the Nuba in Tunisian music, and finally the use of forms such as Turkish, Samai and Bashraf. Also influenced by Western culture, it is relatively diversified.

Of major note in Tunisian classical music is the Malouf. Deriving from the reign of the Aghlabids in the 15th century, it is a particular type of Arab-Andalusian music. In urban areas it uses stringed instruments (fiddle, oud and Kanun) and percussion (darbuka) while in rural areas, it may also be accompanied by instruments like the mezoued, gasba and the zurna.

At the beginning of the twentieth century, musical activity was dominated by the liturgical repertoire associated with different religious brotherhoods and secular repertoire which consisted of instrumental pieces and songs in different Andalusian forms and styles of origins, essentially borrowing characteristics of musical language. In 1930 The Rachidia was founded well known thanks to artists from the Jewish community. The founding in 1934 of a musical school help revive Arab Andalusian music largely to a social and cultural revival led by the elite of the time who became aware of the risks of loss of the musical heritage and which they believed threatened the foundations of Tunisian national identity. The institution did not take long to assemble an elite group of musicians and poets and scholars. The creation of Radio Tunis in 1938 allowed musicians are greater opportunity to disseminate their works.

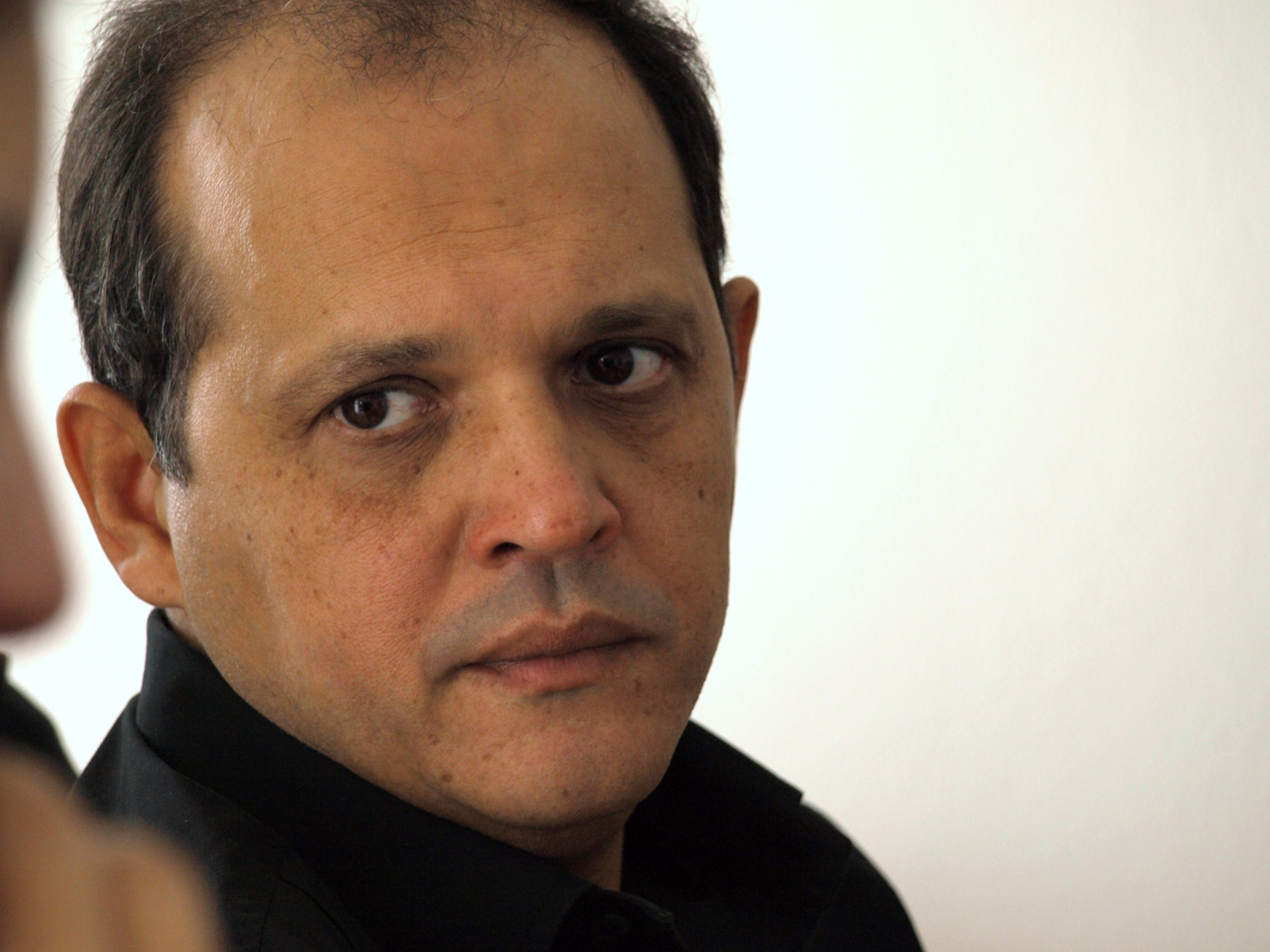
Anouar Brahem

The 1960s and 1970s witnessed the emergence of composers and performers working mostly in the orchestra of the Tunisian Radio and Television. Song using melodies and popular rhythms experienced a significant rise. From the 1980s, the music scene saw the emergence of a generation of musicians, composers and performers of Arab and Western musical training who believed that Tunisian music needed new song writing techniques. The emergence of new patterns of racial and improvised music since the late 1990s changed the musical landscape of Tunisia. At the same time, the majority of the population is attracted by the music of Arab origin (Egyptian, Lebanese or Syrian). Popular western music has also had major success with the emergence of many groups and festivals, including rock music, hip hop, reggae and jazz.

Among the major Tunisian contemporary artists include Hedi Habbouba, Saber Rebaï, Dhafer Youssef, Belgacem Bouguenna, Sonia M'barek and Latifa. Other notable musicians include Salah El Mahdi, Anouar Brahem, Zied Gharsa and Lotfi Bouchnak.

=== Cinema ===
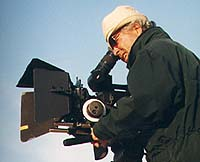
Naceur Ktari (2000)

Tunisian cinema is today recognized as one of the most liberal, inventive, and prize-winning cinemas of the Arab world. Beginning in the 1990s, Tunisia became an attractive place for filming, and numerous successful companies have emerged serving the foreign film industry.

Cinema has been present in Tunisia since its first world appearance. Starting from 1896, the Lumière brothers were showing animated films in the streets of Tunis. In 1919, the first feature-length movie produced on the African continent, Les Cinq gentlemen maudits (The Five Accursed Gentlemen), was filmed in Tunisia. In 1924, Zohra directed a medium-length film called Ain Al-Ghazal (The Girl from Carthage), making him one of the first native filmmakers on the African continent. In 1966, the first feature Tunisian film, Al-Fajr (The Dawn), was directed and produced by Omar Khlifi; it was 95 minutes long, shot on 35 mm film. Tunisia also hosts the Carthage Film Festival which has been taking place since 1966. The festival, which gives priority to films from Arab and African countries, is the oldest film festival on the African continent and the Arab World.

In 1927, the first Tunisian film distribution company, Tunis-Film, started its activities. After independence, movies were exclusively produced by SATPEC (Société Anonyme Tunisienne de Production et d'Expansion Cinématographique), which controlled cinema and filming productions in the country at the time. Nevertheless, during the 1980s, private production companies and studios emerged and wanted to make Tunisia the Mediterranean Hollywood. The producer Tarak Ben Ammar, a nephew of Wasila Bourguiba, succeeded in attracting some big production companies to shoot in his studios in Monastir. Major foreign movies were filmed in Tunisia, including Roman Polanski's Pirates and Franco Zeffirelli's Jesus of Nazareth. After visiting Tunisia, George Lucas was seduced by the natural beauty and authentic old architecture of some southern Tunisian towns, where he decided to film the important Tatooine scenes of Star Wars, as well as Indiana Jones. Moreover, Anthony Minghella filmed the nine Academy Awards winner The English Patient in a southwestern oasis of the country.

Domestic Tunisian productions were rare. The few movies which were produced since 1967 tried to reflect the new social dynamics, development, identity research and modernity shock. Some of them achieved relative success outside Tunisia, including La Goulette (Halq El-Wadi, 1996). Directed by Ferid Boughedir, La Goulette showed a flashback of typical community life in the eponymous small suburb, during a period when Muslims, Jews and Christians lived together in tolerance and peace. Boughedir's Halfaouine: Child of the Terraces (Asfour Stah, 1990) is possibly the biggest popular success in the history of Tunisian cinema; it showed the life of a child from the Halfouine suburb of Tunis in the 1960s, and his quest to understand relationships, the world of women and how to be a man.

In earlier films, including Man of Ashes (Rih Essedd, 1986), director and writer Nouri Bouzid depicts controversial issues in Tunisian society, addressing social issues like prostitution, pedophilia and inter-faith relations between Tunisian Muslims and Tunisian Jews. In the 1991 film Bezness, he explores the country's emerging sexual tourism trade.

The Ambassadors (As-Soufraa, 1975), directed by Naceur Ktari, portrayed the life of immigrant Maghrebins in France and their struggle against racism. The film won the Golden Tanit for the best picture in the Carthage Film Festival in 1976 and the special jury award from the Locarno International Film Festival in the same year, and was classified in the Un Certain Regard category during the 1978 Cannes Film Festival.

The first feature film ever to be directed by a woman in the Arab World was The Silences of Palace (Samt Al-Qusur, 1994). The director, Moufida Tlatli, won several international jury awards for her work. The movie shows the daily life in an aristocratic palace in Tunis through the eyes of a young woman.

In 2007, several films were produced and grabbed public attention, such as Nouri Bouzid's Making Of and Nejib Belkadi's VHS Kahloucha.

=== Theatre ===
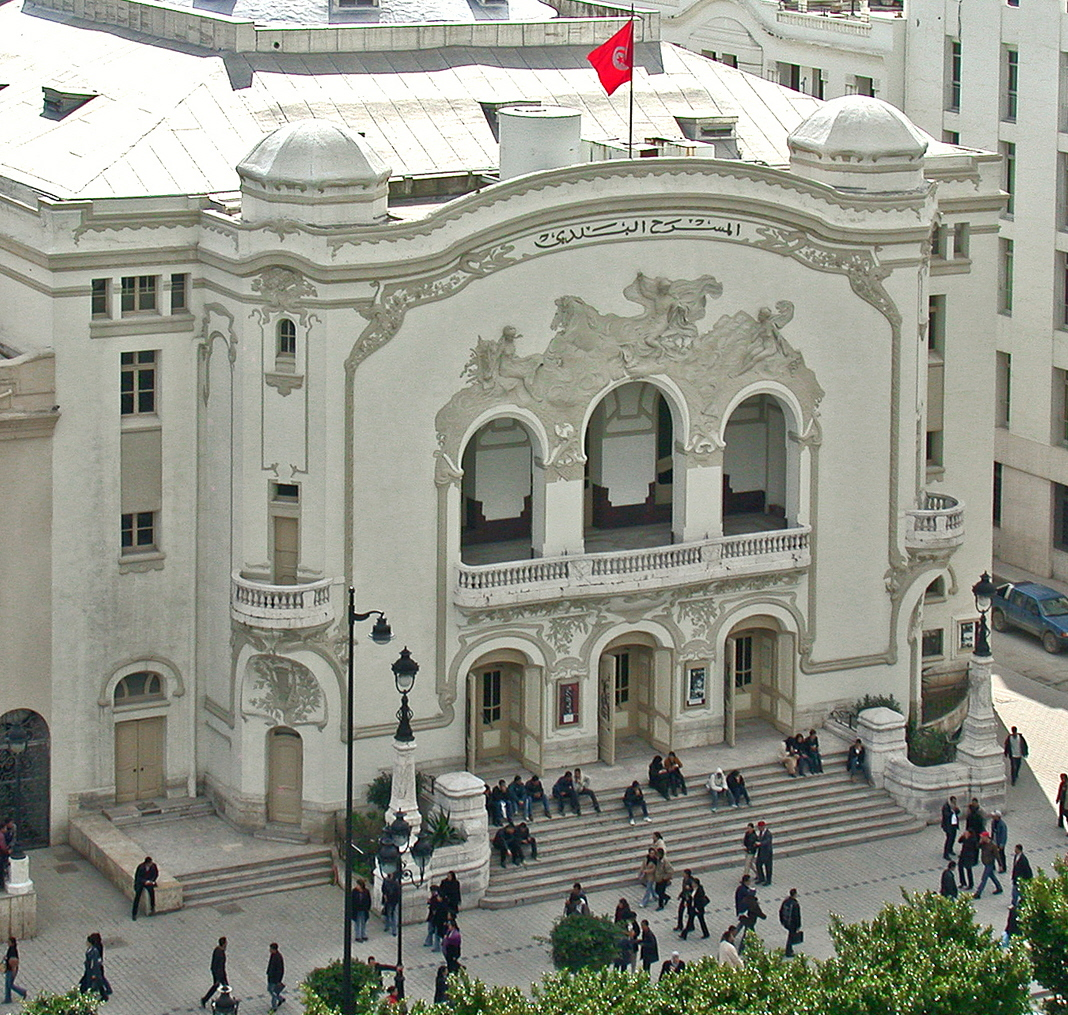
Municipal Theatre of Tunis

The Tunisian theater was mostly developed in the late nineteenth and early twentieth centuries, during the French protectorate. Theaters grew up, such as the French Theater, Politeama Rossini, Arena, Theater Tunisia, the Gringa, Paradiso, etc. Some wooden theaters have since been destroyed by fire, while others have simply changed their function; only one is still in use as a theater, the Municipal Theater of Tunis. In over a century of existence, the theater has hosted big names of the Tunisian and international theatrical scene, such as Sarah Bernhardt, Pauline Carton, Gérard Philipe and Jean Marais. On November 7, 1962, the Tunisian president Habib Bourguiba (whose brother, Mohamed Bourguiba, was a playwright), devoted his speech to theater, which he considers "a powerful means of disseminating culture and a most effective means of popular education". From this date, November 7 is regarded as the Tunisian National Day of drama.

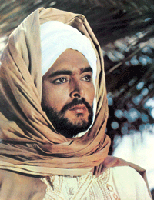
Aly Ben Ayed, one of the notable figures of Tunisian theatre

In 1970, under the leadership of the actor Aly Ben Ayed, Caligula by Albert Camus was translated into Arabic, to great popular success. Other works written by Habib Boularès, such as Murad III or The Time of Buraq, retained the themes of bloody violence. Increasingly, more and more shows are restricted for the benefit of a more sophisticated audience. The New Theater of Tunis grew up with Mohamed Driss as one of the most prolific authors. In 1988, Driss was appointed head of the Tunisian National Theater (TNT), and took charge of renovating a neglected theatre, Le Paris, located in the heart of Tunis. He acquired a stage, employed a team of modern architects to rebuild it, and renamed it the "Fourth Art". Opened in 1996, it alternates between cycles of TNT theater and ballet, circus and song. Each cultural season lasts from October 1 to June 30; the theatre has hosted more than 80 theatrical performances.

In addition to the activities in Tunis other large cities had professional theater groups, most notably Sfax, which boasted of a modern theater venue built post World War II. Many hit plays were produced by the theater group of Sfax in the 1960s and 1970s featuring one of their leading actors at the time, Habib Laroussi, who also played in many national and international TV movies and TV series. Two of the hit plays of the 1960s were "Rabeh Zmim El Houma" (Rabeh the neighborhood leader) directed by Jamil El Joudi and starred by Habib Laroussi, and "Hares El Mahattah" (The train station attendant) directed by Jamil El Joudi and starred by Mohieddin and Habib Laroussi. Throughout the 1960s and 1970s Laroussi collaborated heavily with Jamil El Joudi and the prominent Sfaxien playwright Ameur Tounsi, who discovered and mentored Laroussi in the early 1950s. Tounsi wrote several hit plays that were broadcast by radio Sfax, such as "Intikam El Zaman" (revenge of time)starred by Laroussi and other actors from the Sfax theater community.

El Teatro is the first private theatre in Tunisia. Founded in 1987 by Taoufik Jebali, in a wing of the hotel El Mechtel Tunis, El Teatro consists of the main hall of representatives with some 200 seats, an annex called the Carré d'Art, and a gallery called Free Area. El Teatro is directed by Zeineb Farhat. Throughout the year, El Teatro offers theater, dance performances, jazz concerts, galas of Arabic music, art exhibitions and poetry readings.

=== Dance ===
A man teaching Tunisian dance to children.

Dancing in Tunisia is characterized by the multitude of forms it takes and contexts in which it appears, including circumcisions, weddings, festivals, concerts, and football games. Tunisian dance resembles Egyptian dance, and is distinguished mainly by its dynamic, which is faster with more staccato, and its multitude of forms, each region having its own "style". It is therefore difficult to speak of a Tunisian dance, especially since the Egyptian influence appears to have long proven itself in major cities.

The variety of dances performed by the Tunisians probably reflects the migration flows that have traversed the country throughout the centuries. The early Phoenicians brought with them their songs and dances, whose traces can still be seen in Tunisian dance; on the other hand, the Roman occupation had little influence on Tunisian dance, especially compared to its significant architectural legacy. The arrival of the Banu Hilal in the eleventh century completed the implementation of the Arab Maghreb in Tunisia, introducing the traditions, music and dance of the nomads of Upper Egypt. Religious dances were influenced by Sufism, but by the end of the 15th century they were increasingly subject to the influence of Andalusian dance and urban music. The time at which Oriental dance arrived in Tunisia is disputed: it is generally believed to have arrived at a later date with the Ottomans, but some experts in the history of North African art have said it was brought to Tunisia by the first Turkish corsairs in the sixteenth century, and others claim that it originated even earlier, founded by the early Phoenicians during the era of matriarchy in Mesopotamia. Characteristic features of oriental dance as performed in Tunisia include the rhythmic movements of the pelvis, movement highlighted by the elevation of the arms to horizontal, and feet moving in rhythm and transferring weight onto the right or left leg.

The dance reflects a social phenomenon born in the working classes of Tunisian cities. The male dance is typically accompanied by love songs which evoke libertine seduction, attraction and the carnal pleasures of life; it has long been performed in cafes backed by music, typically the darbuka and mezoued. Since the 1970s, however, the dance has declined in cafes and is more often displayed at festivals, circumcision ceremonies, and weddings in big cities.

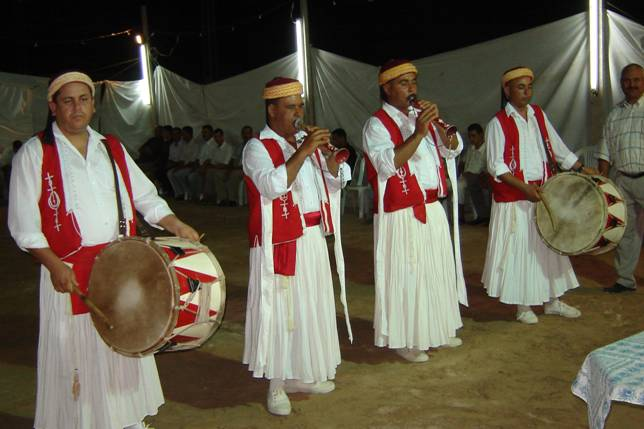
Folklore Troupe of Kerkennah

The Nuba, more rooted in popular practice, is linked to the dancers, and to a lesser extent the Kerkennah Djerba. Some experts say that the associated dress is of Greek origin. The dance, which is structured into several scenes, is often accompanied by acrobatic games involving jars of water.

The most common religious dance is probably the Stambali, which originated as a ritual dance to glorify Sidi Saad, a devout Sudanese Muslim who arrived in Tunisia with his followers in the sixteenth century. Today his shrine is located in the Mornag region. However, in the aftermath of independence, the authorities have banned the ritual and closed many of the sanctuaries. While followers still continue their rituals at home, the dance has subsequently been adopted by the Jews and lost its connection to its Islamic origins.

The National Troupe Folk Art Center and the National Dance of Ariana continue practice the traditional Tunisian dances. The national archives notably suffer from a lack of documents related to these dances, as well as to folk arts more broadly.

=== Painting ===
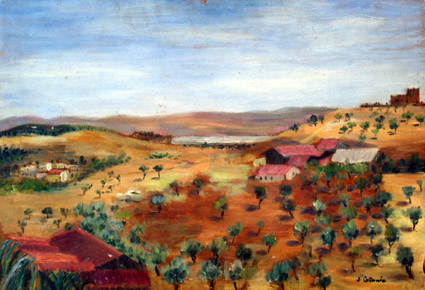
Tunisian painting

Because of the Muslim prohibition on reproducing the human image, the ruling dynasties of Tunisia stifled pictorial art for centuries; painters therefore often turned to calligraphy. Painting as a Tunisian art form was not reborn until the French protectorate. Although at the beginning of the twentieth century galleries were reserved for European painters, native Tunisian artists such as Moses Levy and Yahia Turki were able to obtain permission to present their work.

The birth of a Tunisian contemporary style of painting is strongly linked to the School of Tunis. Established in 1949 by a group of Tunisian artists headed by Pierre Boucherle and including Yahia Turki, Abdelaziz Gorgi, Moses Levy, Ammar Farhat and Jules Lellouche, it aimed to incorporate native themes and reject the influence of Orientalist colonial painting, bringing together French and Tunisian Muslims, Christians and Jews. Some members of the school have turned to the Arab-Muslim sources for inspiration, such as miniature Islamic architecture. The school includes both Expressionist painters such as Amara Debbache, Jellal Ben Abdallah and Ali Ben Salem, and abstract artists such as Edgar Naccache, Nello Levy and Hedi Turki.

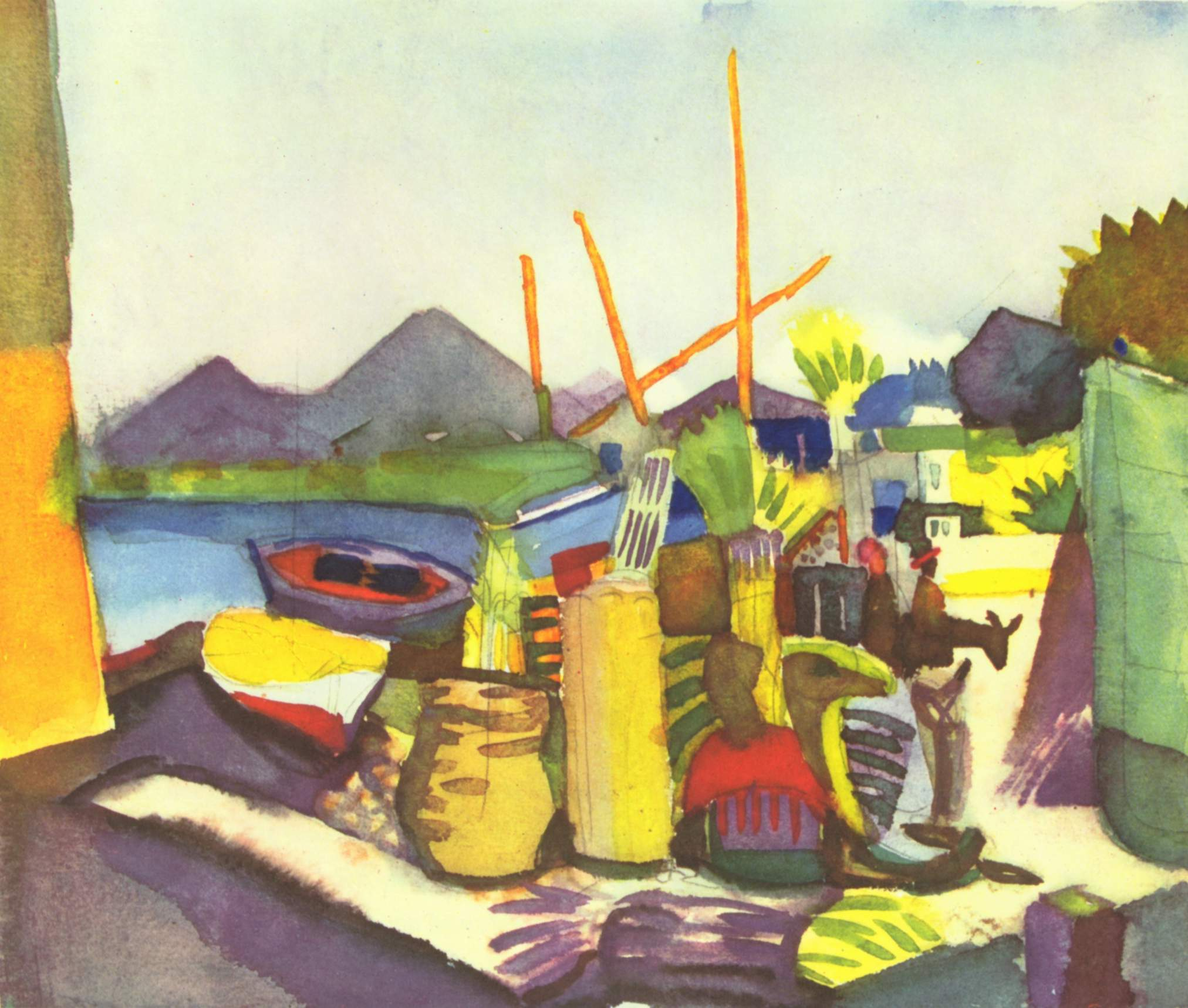
Paysage des environs de Hammamet by August Macke (1914)

After independence in 1956, the art movement in Tunisia was propelled by the dynamics of nation building and by artists serving the state. A Ministry of Culture was established, under the leadership of ministers such as Habib Boularès who saw art and education and power. Artists such as Hatem El Mekki and Zoubeir Turki gained international recognition and influenced a new generation of young painters. Sadok Gmech drew his inspiration from national wealth, while Moncef Ben Amor turned to fantasy. Youssef Rekik revived the technique of painting on glass and founded Nja Mahdaoui calligraphy with its mystical dimension.

In the 1970s, a new wave of artists appeared, who were less homogeneous in their academic formation. Many of them had received an artistic education almost exclusively provided by Tunisian professors at the Tunis Institute of Fine Arts or at the National School of Architecture and Urbanism; such artists included Ali Zenaidi, Abdelmajid Ben Messaoud, Fethi Ben Zakour, Adel Megdiche, Noureddine El Hani, Raouf Gara, Brahim Azzabi, Mohamed Njeh, and Habib Bida.

Many European painters have also been influenced by Tunisia; the most famous of these being the Franco-Russian Alexander Roubtzoff, often regarded as the "painter of Tunisia". He arrived in Tunis in 1914 through a grant from the Imperial Academy of Fine Arts in St. Petersburg, and subsequently settled permanently in Tunisia, producing some 3,000 paintings representing aspects of Tunisia before his death in 1949. Paul Klee and August Macke also visited Tunisia in 1914 and left a lasting impression. Macke is noted for his series of watercolors in the cubist style, while Klee is noted for his advocation of light and colors to illustrate the Tunisian landscape.

There are currently fifty art galleries housing exhibitions of Tunisian and international artists. These include Gallery Yahia in Tunis and the Carthage Essaadi gallery.

=== Literature ===
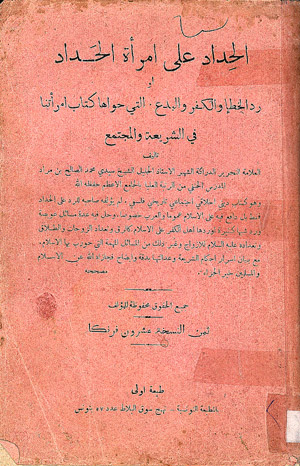
First page of a Tunisian book (1931) by Mohamed Salah Ben Mrad (1881–1979)

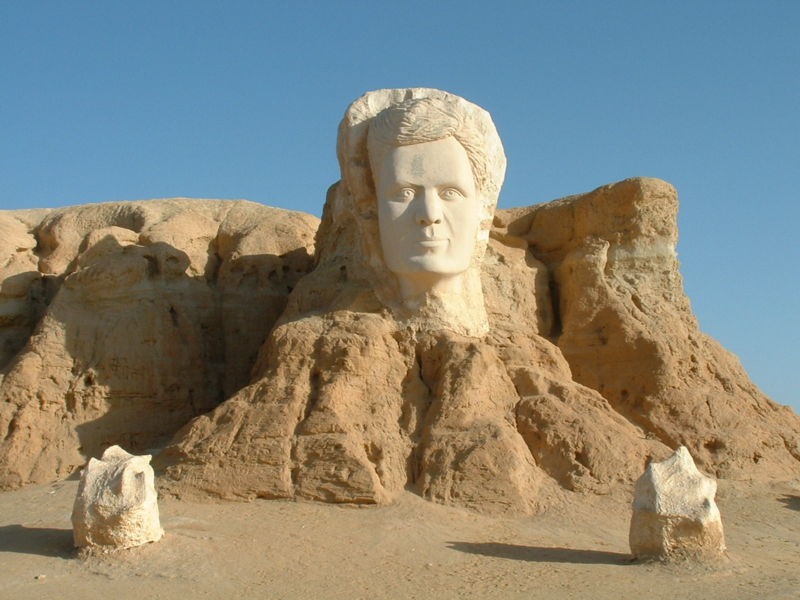
Bust of Abou el Kacem Chebbi in Ras El Aïn (Tozeur)

Tunisian literature exists in two forms: Arabic and French. Arabic literature dates back to the seventh century with the arrival of Arab civilization in the region. It is more significant in both volume and literary quality than French literature, introduced during the French protectorate from 1881. Tunisian literary figures include Douagi Ali, who has produced more than 150 radio stories, over 500 poems and folk songs and nearly 15 plays; Khraief Bashir, an Arabic novelist who published many notable books in the 1930s, causing a scandal because the dialogues were written in Tunisian dialect; and others such as Moncef Ghachem, Mohamed Salah Ben Mrad and Mahmoud Messaadi. Tunisian poetry is characterized by nonconformity and innovation, such as that seen in the works of Aboul-Qacem Echebbi, while French Tunisian literature is most notable for its critical approach. Contrary to the pessimism of Albert Memmi, who predicted that Tunisian literature was sentenced to die young, many Tunisian writers have been successful traveling abroad, including Abdelwahab Meddeb, Bakri Tahar, Mustapha Tlili, Hele Beji and Mellah Fawzi. Their writing focuses on themes of wandering, exile and heartbreak.

The national bibliography lists 1249 non-school books published in 2002 in Tunisia, with 885 titles in Arabic. In 2006 this figure had increased to 1,500; in 2007, to 1,700. Nearly a third of these are children's books.

== Publishing ==
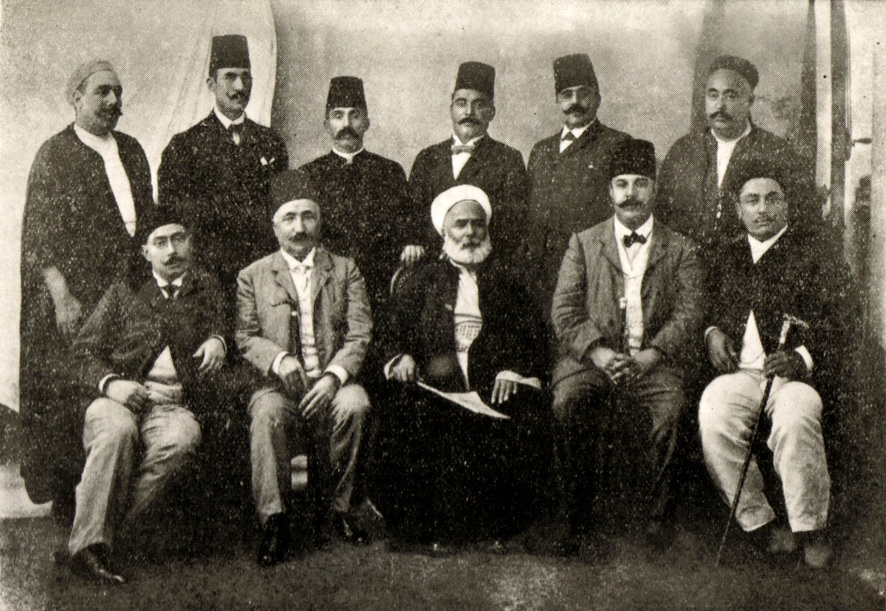
Directing Committee of the Khaldounia in 1903

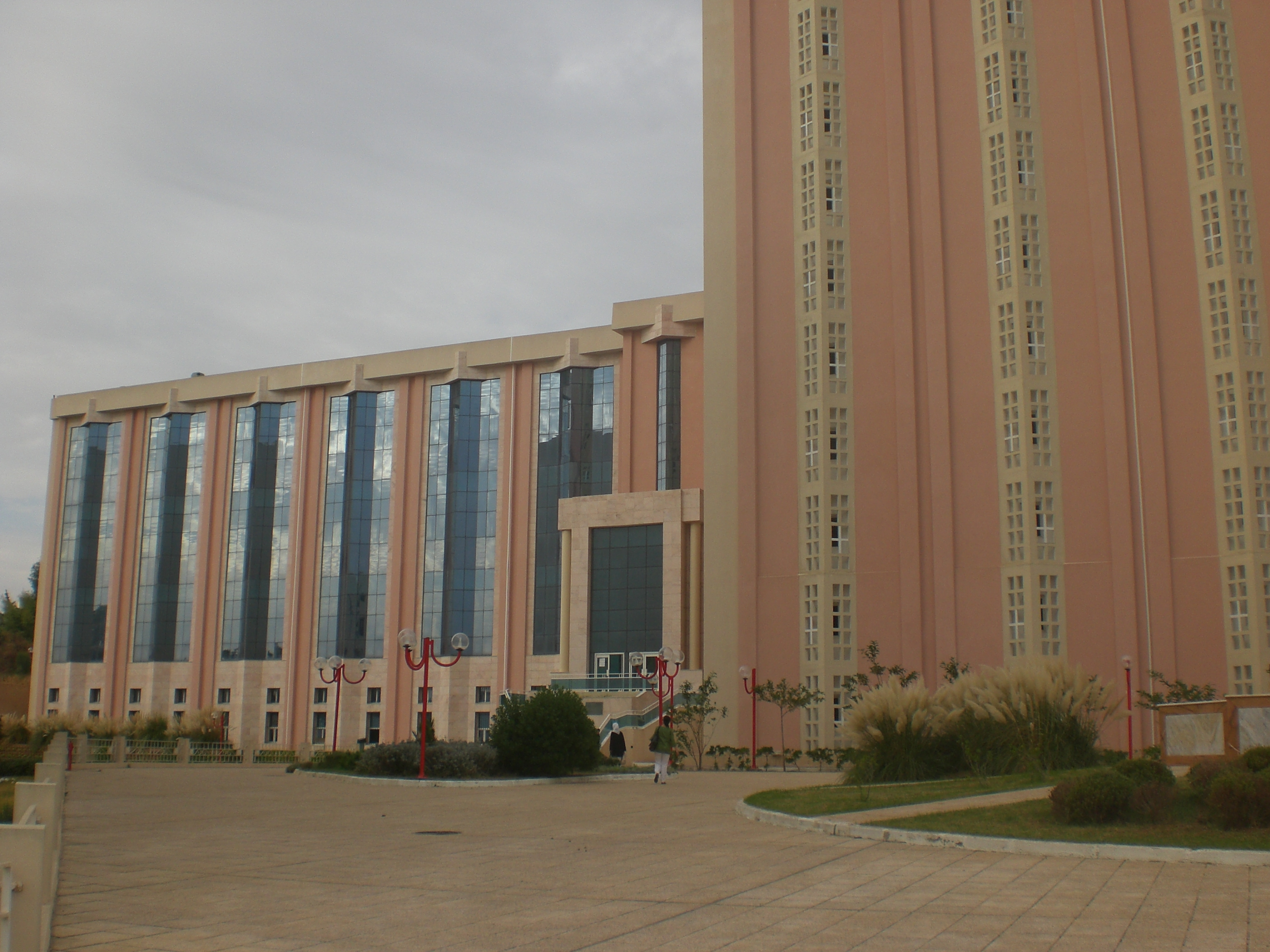
The National Library of Tunisia

At the end of the nineteenth and beginning of the twentieth century, there was a close relationship between the bourgeois elite and business associations and the Khaldounia Alumni College Sadiki printing press. The French protectorate controlled the press, and affected the publication and dissemination of newspapers at a local level. After the First World War, Tunisian gradually moved into a better position, and during the inter-war years Arabic publishing began to flourish. Before Tunisian independence was proclaimed in 1956, the publication of Tunisian literature was provided by the booksellers, printers and a few publishing houses run by the private French press; subsequently, the state commanded the creation of a major new publishing structure, with the aim of establishing a modern national culture as part of its general culture and education targets. Thus, the state produced over 70% of the books between 1956 and 1987, leaving private publishing little opportunity to evolve.

It was not until the early 1990s that the state abandoned its role in centralising publishing. Private publishing companies quickly sprang up in reaction; the editorial production between 1987 and 1996 amounted to 6,068 titles. Most of Tunisia's present book production comes from the private sector, with over a hundred publishers in operation. The budget devoted to literature by the Ministry of Culture in 2003 exceeded three million Tunisian dinars for the purchase of Tunisian and foreign books and periodicals. 2003 was proclaimed "National Book Year" in Tunisia, and celebrated with fairs, exhibitions, meetings for reflection and debate, and writing contests.

== Media ==
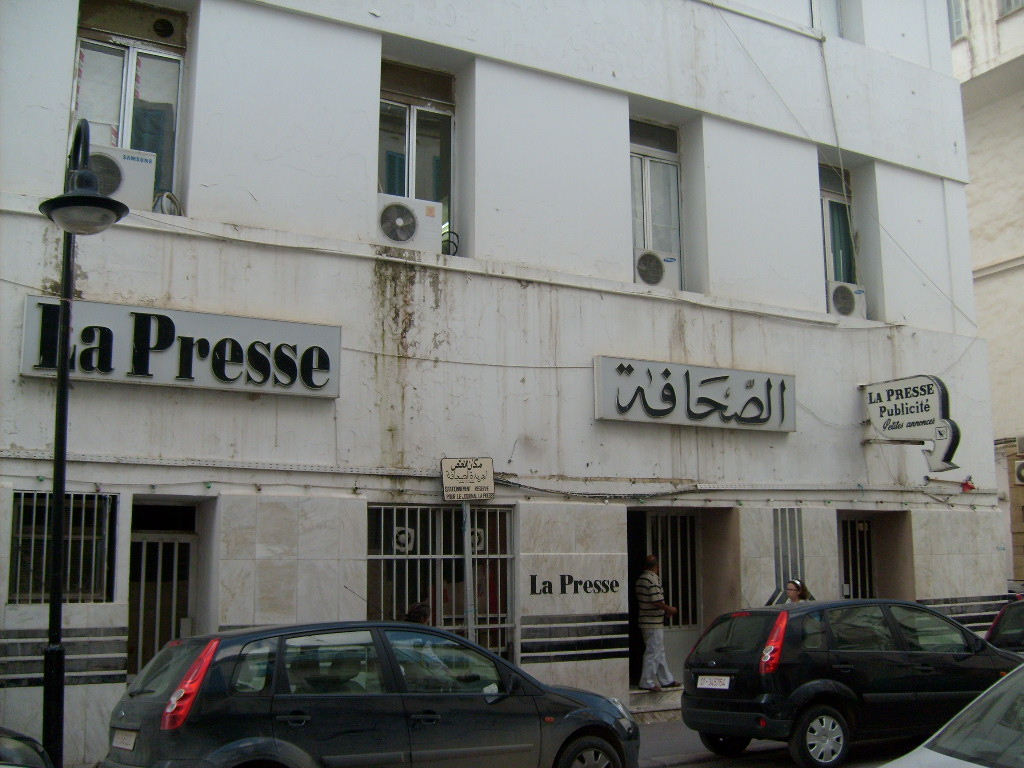
Headquarters of the journal, La Presse de Tunisie in Tunis

Tunisian television has long been controlled by the Establishment of the Broadcasting Authority Tunisia (ERTT) and its predecessor, the Tunisian Radio and Television, founded in 1957. On November 7, 2006, President Zine el-Abidine Ben Ali announced the demerger of the business, which became effective on August 31, 2007. Until then, ERTT managed all public television stations (Télévision Tunisienne 1 and Télévision Tunisienne 2, which had replaced the defunct RTT 2), four national radio stations (Radio Tunis, Tunisia Radio Culture, Youth and Radio RTCI), and five regional (Sfax, Monastir, Gafsa, Le Kef and Tataouine). Most programs are in Arabic, with a minority in French. Since 2003, a growth in private sector broadcasting is underway, including the creation of Radio Mosaique FM, Jawhara FM, Zaytuna FM, Hannibal TV, and Nessma TV.

In 2007, some 245 newspapers and magazines (compared to only 91 in 1987) are 90% owned by private groups and independents. The Tunisian political parties have the right to publish their own newspapers, but those of the opposition parties (such as Al Mawkif or Mouwatinoun) have very limited editions. Freedom of the press is guaranteed by the constitution, but almost all newspapers following the government line report uncritically on the activities of the president, government and the Constitutional Democratic Rally Party (in power) through the Agence Tunis Afrique Presse.

== Festivals ==
Hundreds of international festivals, national, regional or local punctuate the calendar year. Music and theatrical festivals dominate the national cultural scene.

Several festivals take place annually in summer: the Carthage International Festival in July, the International Festival of Arts of Mahr from late July to early August, and the International Festival of Hammamet in July and August.

The Carthage Film Festival is held in October and November of every other year, alternating with the Carthage Theatre Festival. It was created in 1966 by the Tunisian Minister of Culture to showcase films from the Maghreb, Africa and the Middle East. In order to be eligible for the competition, a film must have a director of African or Middle Eastern nationality, and have been produced at least two years before entry. The grand prize is the Tanit d'or, or "Golden Tanit," named for the lunar goddess of ancient Carthage; the award is in the shape of her symbol, a trapezium surmounted by a horizontal line and a circle.

The International Festival of the Sahara, celebrated annually at the end of December, honors the cultural traditions associated with the Tunisian desert. This attracts many tourists and musicians from all around the world, as well as horsemen who flaunt their saddles and local fabrics and skills.

There are also a number of musical festivals; some honor traditional Tunisian music, while others, including the Tabarka Jazz Festival, focus on other genres.

In the city of Sousse, the Carnival of Awussu is an annual festive and cultural event that unfolds each 24th of July. It's a parade of symbolic chariots, fanfares and folk groups from Tunisia and elsewhere which takes place near the beach of Boujaafar, at the eve of the beginning of 'Awussu (The word designating the heat wave of the month of August according to the Berber calendar). Originally it was a Pagan feast (Neptunalia) celebrating the god of the seas, Neptune in the Roman province of Africa, and might even go back to Phoenician times : the appellation Awussu is a possible deformation of Oceanus.

Omek Tannou is an ancient Tunisian rainmaking festival which was inherited from Punic and Berber traditions involving invocations of the goddess Tanit. It features the ritual use of the sculpted head of a woman (somewhat resembling the head of a girl's doll), which is carried in procession between the houses of a village during periods of drought by children singing the refrain أمك طانقو يا نساء طلبت ربي عالشتاء (transliteration: amk ṭangu ya nsaʾ tlbt rbi ʿalshta'a, "Amek tango, o women, ask God to rain". This song varies according to the region because the term shta designates rain only in certain urban areas. Each housewife then pours a little water on the statuette, invoking rain.

== Architecture ==
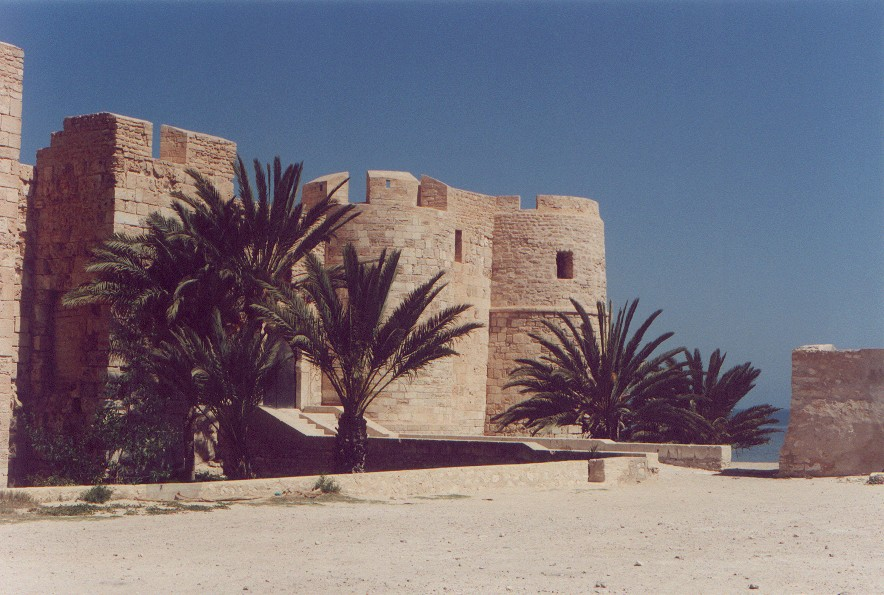
Djerba Fort

Islamic architecture and Roman architecture are expressed in various facets in Tunisia. Through many buildings, Kairouan forms the epicenter of an architectural movement expressing the relationship between buildings and spirituality with the ornamental decoration of religious buildings in the holy city. In Djerba, the architecture such as the fortress of Kef reflects the military and spiritual destiny of a Sufi influence in the region.

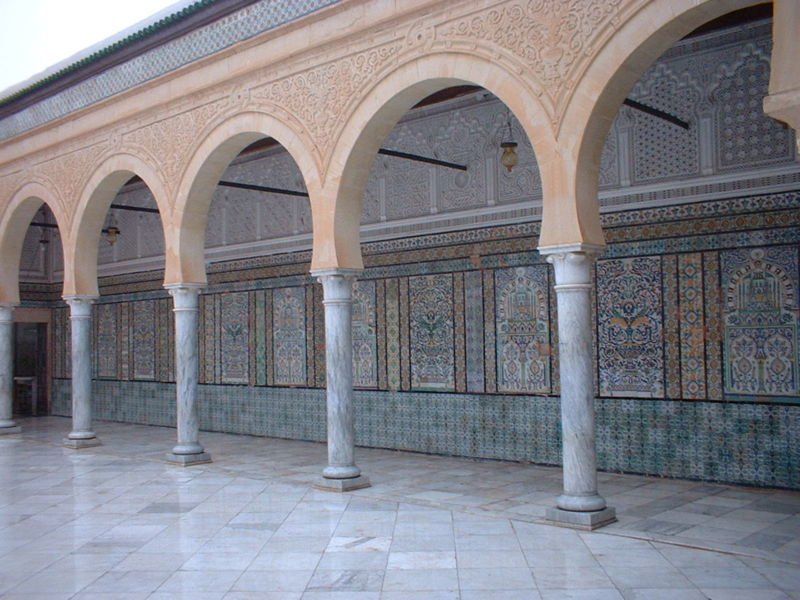
Mosque in Kairouan

The influential role of the various dynasties that ruled the country, particularly in building cities and princes of Raqqada Mahdia, illuminates the role of the geopolitical context in the architectural history of the country. Thus, many original fortresses that protected the coast from Byzantine invasions evolved into cities, like Monastir, Sousse or Lamta.

The medina of Tunis, is World Heritage Site of UNESCO, and is a typical example of Islamic architecture. However, in the areas between the ports of Bizerte and Ghar El Melh, settlements founded by the Moors fleeing Andalusia were reconquered by Catholic sovereigns and has more of a Christian influence.

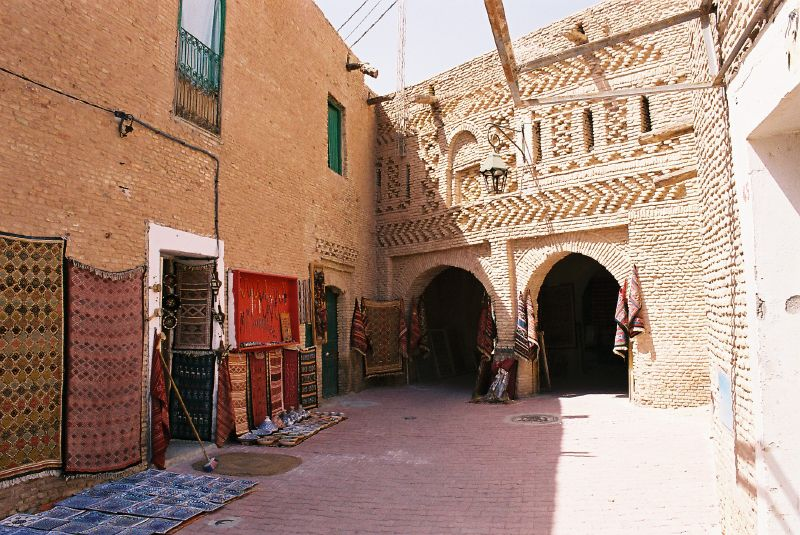
Medina of Tozeur

Given the cosmopolitan nature of cities in Tunisia, they have retained a diversity and juxtaposition of styles. Many buildings were designed by many different architects, artisans and entrepreneurs during the French protectorate. Among the most famous architects of that time were Victor Valensi, Guy Raphael, Henri Saladin, Joss Ellenon and Jean-Emile Resplandy. Five distinct architectural and decorative styles are particularly popular: those of the eclectic style (neo-classical, baroque, etc..) Between 1881 and 1900 and then again until 1920 the style was neo-Mauresque, between 1925 and 1940 it was in the Art Deco style and then the modernist style between 1943 and 1947.

In the south, the oasis of Gafsa, Tozeur and Nefta, and ksours and cave dwellings of Matmata are characterized by their response to the hostile environment arising from the heat and dryness of the desert or semi-desert.

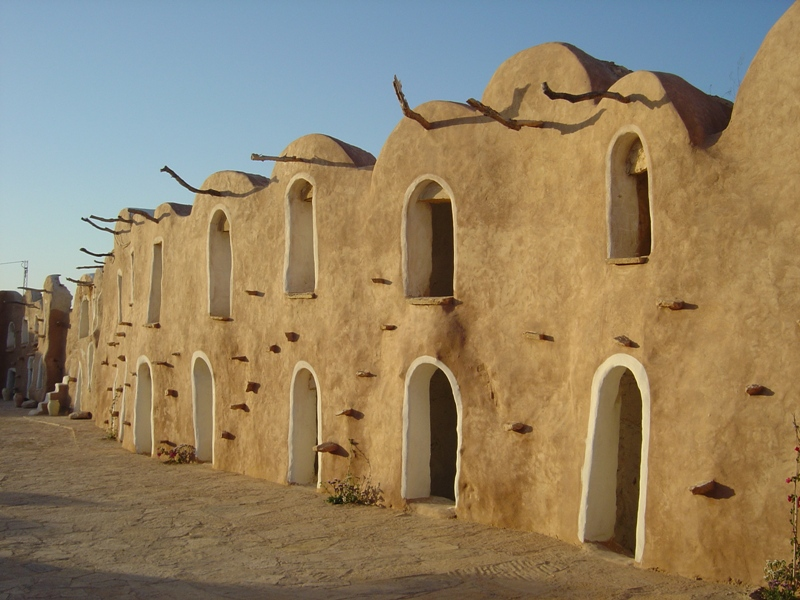
Ksar Ouled Debbab

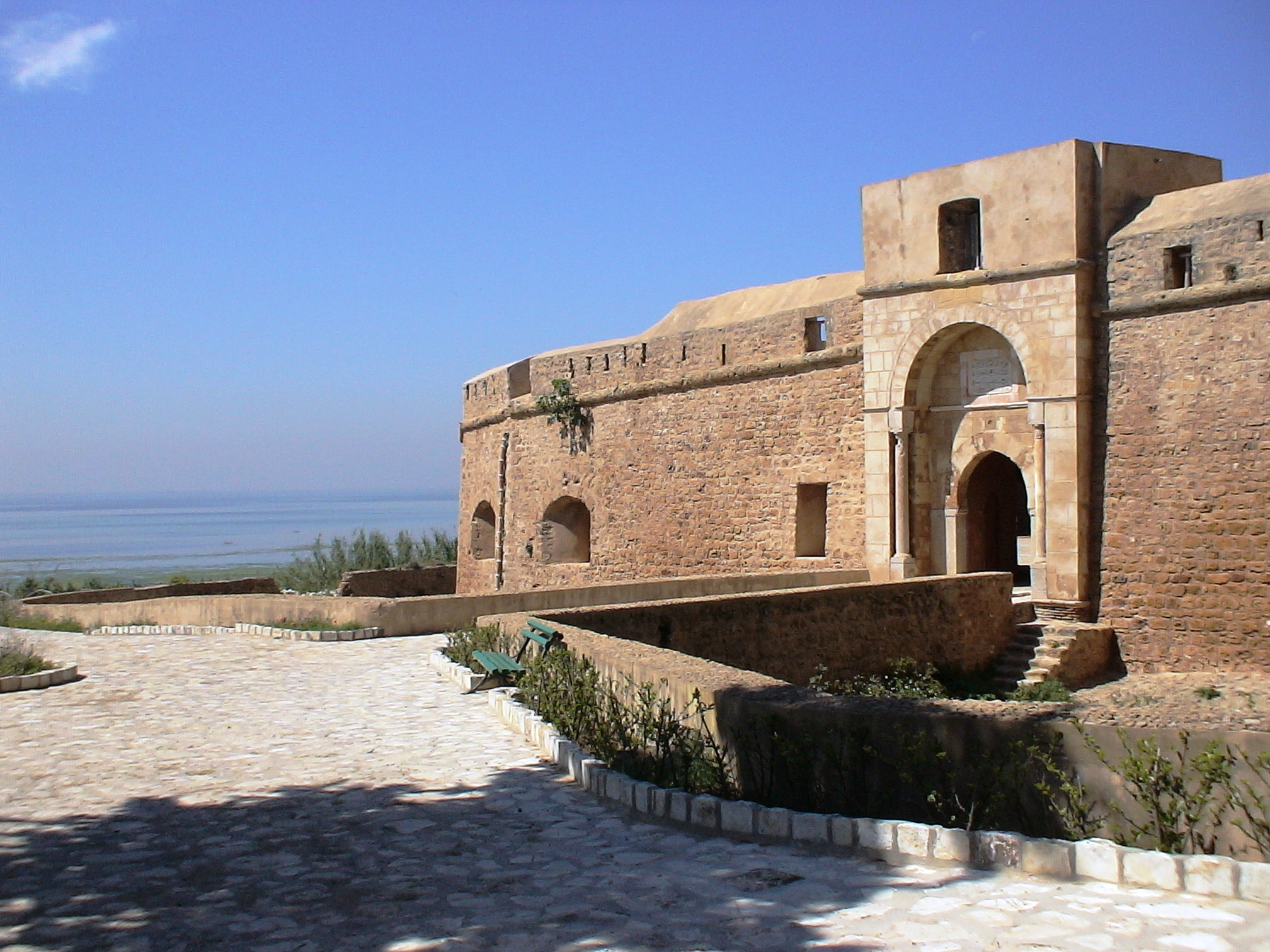
Fort of Ghar El Melh

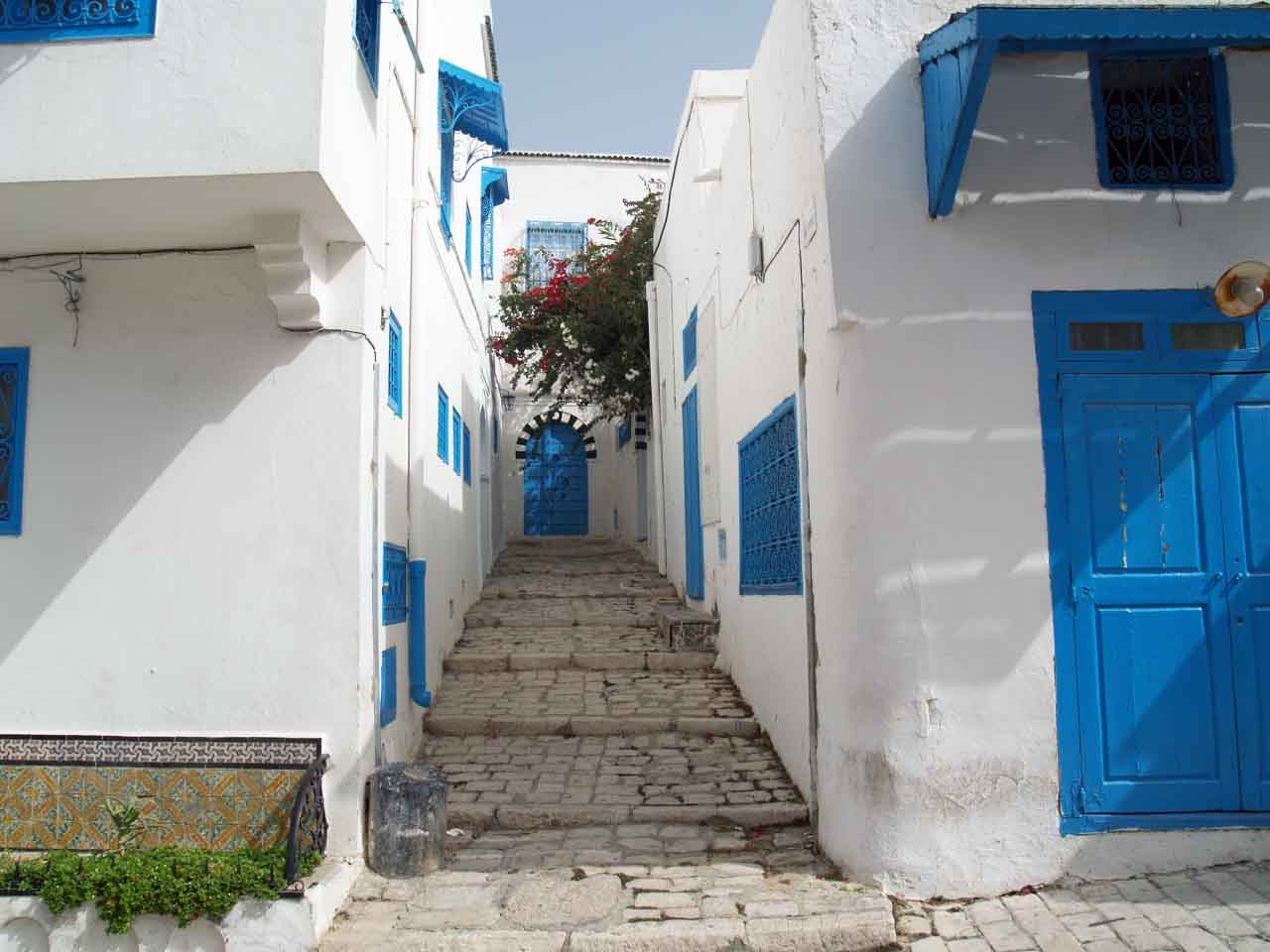
Alley of Sidi Bou Saïd

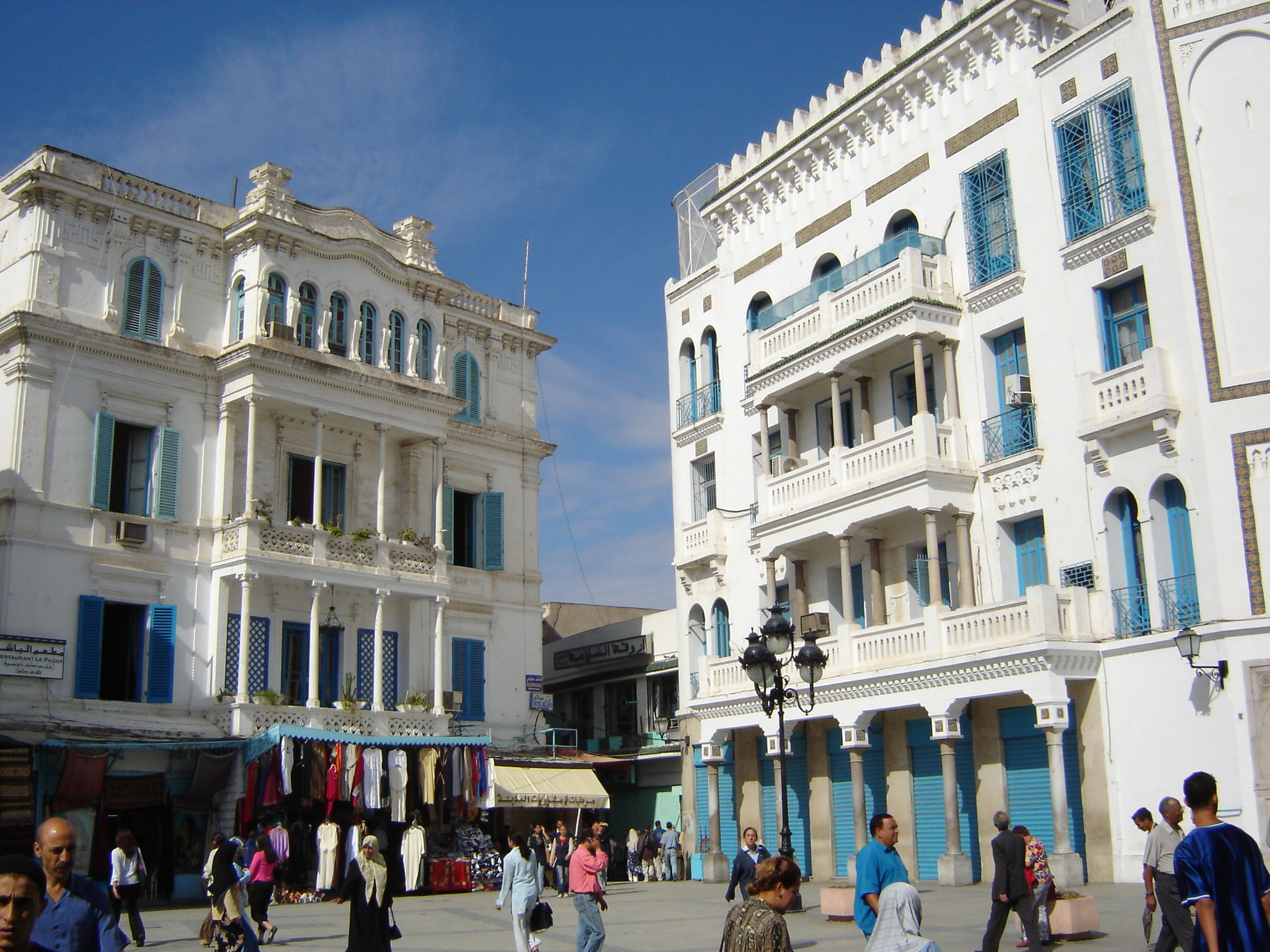
Buildings of the Place de la Victoire in Tunis

== Traditions ==
=== Crafts ===
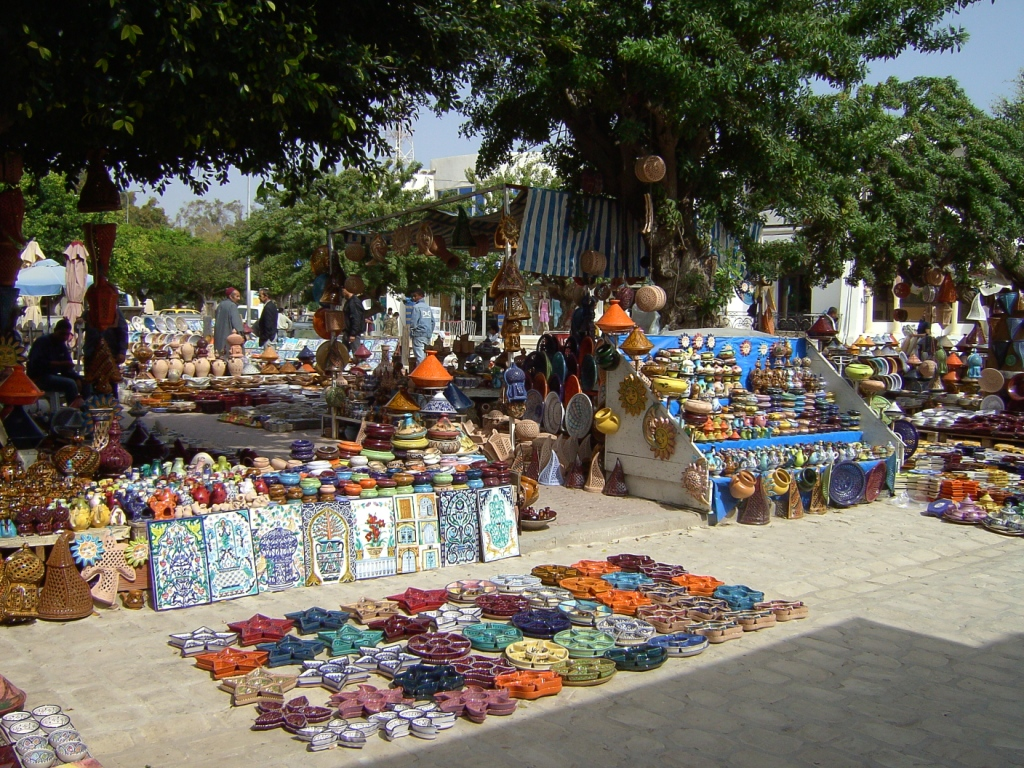
Pottery in Houmt Souk, Djerba

Tunisia is also known for its many craft products and many of the regions of Tunisia have different specialities and trades.

Tunisian pottery is mainly influenced by Guellala, a city behind the creation of other pottery centers on the coast of Tunisia, including Tunis, Nabeul, Moknine, etc. Yellow, green or brown enamel is the trademark of Nabeul for example. Shaping, baking and decoration of pottery however, remain primitive.

The ironwork in Tunisia dates back to the Andalusian era when the studded ornamental wrought iron doors become a characteristic. Blue is the tradition with the window shutters, intended to beautify the homes and preserve the privacy of residents and ward off evil spirits. The grids recall the lattices of the Arab-Andalusian tradition, and carved wood panels, which enabled women to watch the street without being seen.

At the beginning of the twentieth century, each region and often even each village had its own costume. Today, traditional dress is mostly reserved for only weddings and other national or native ceremonies. On a national level, the jebba has become traditional dress, a wide coat covering the whole body, which differs depending on the quality of its fabric, its colors and its trimmings. The men's slippers are usually the natural color of the leather, while women's are generally of embroidered silk, cotton, gold and silver with floral patterns. Although the workshops in each city and some villages produce textiles typical of the region such as Gabes, the quantity sold is low compared to centers such as Kairouan which is still the national center of carpet production. The kilim, an embroidered rug is a legacy of Ottoman rule in Tunisia.

Finally, Tunisia has a rich tradition of mosaics dating back to ancient times. Punic mosaics were found at sites around Kerkouane or Byrsa hill at Carthage dating to Roman times, a mosacis with pictorial representation, combined with high quality marble, has been found, especially on the site of Chemtou.

=== Traditional clothing ===
==== Masculine clothing ====
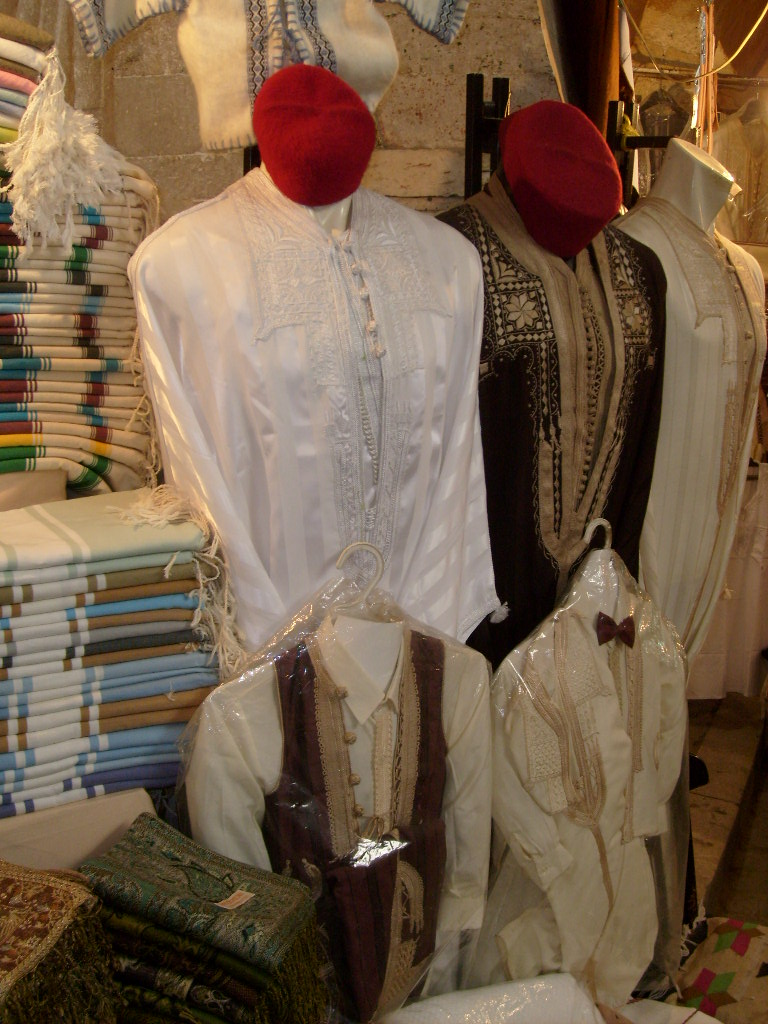
Jebbas and chechias in a souk in Tunis

In rural areas, the jebba is considered a ceremonial garment. White in summer and grey in winter, it is a sleeveless tunic that a man wears over a shirt, vest and baggy trousers (called seroual). On ordinary days, the men merely wear simple trousers and shirts, or/and a woollen tunic of a slimmer fit than the jebba and fitted with long sleeves. In winter, they wear a heavy wool cloak which is often hooded, or in the north a kachabiya, which differs from the latter by its brown and white stripes.

In urban areas, the ceremonial dress consists of a linen shirt with collar and long sleeves. The seroual is adorned at the bottom of the legs with decorative pockets. A wide belt, cut from the same material keeps the seroual in shape. A jebba, a wool and silk full dress is worn in winter. The shoes, leather slippers, leave the heel exposed. Finally, the headdress is a chechia, a red felt hat which is sometimes adorned with a tassel of black thread. For a casual ceremony, during leisure hours, often just a jebba is worn.

==== Feminine clothing ====
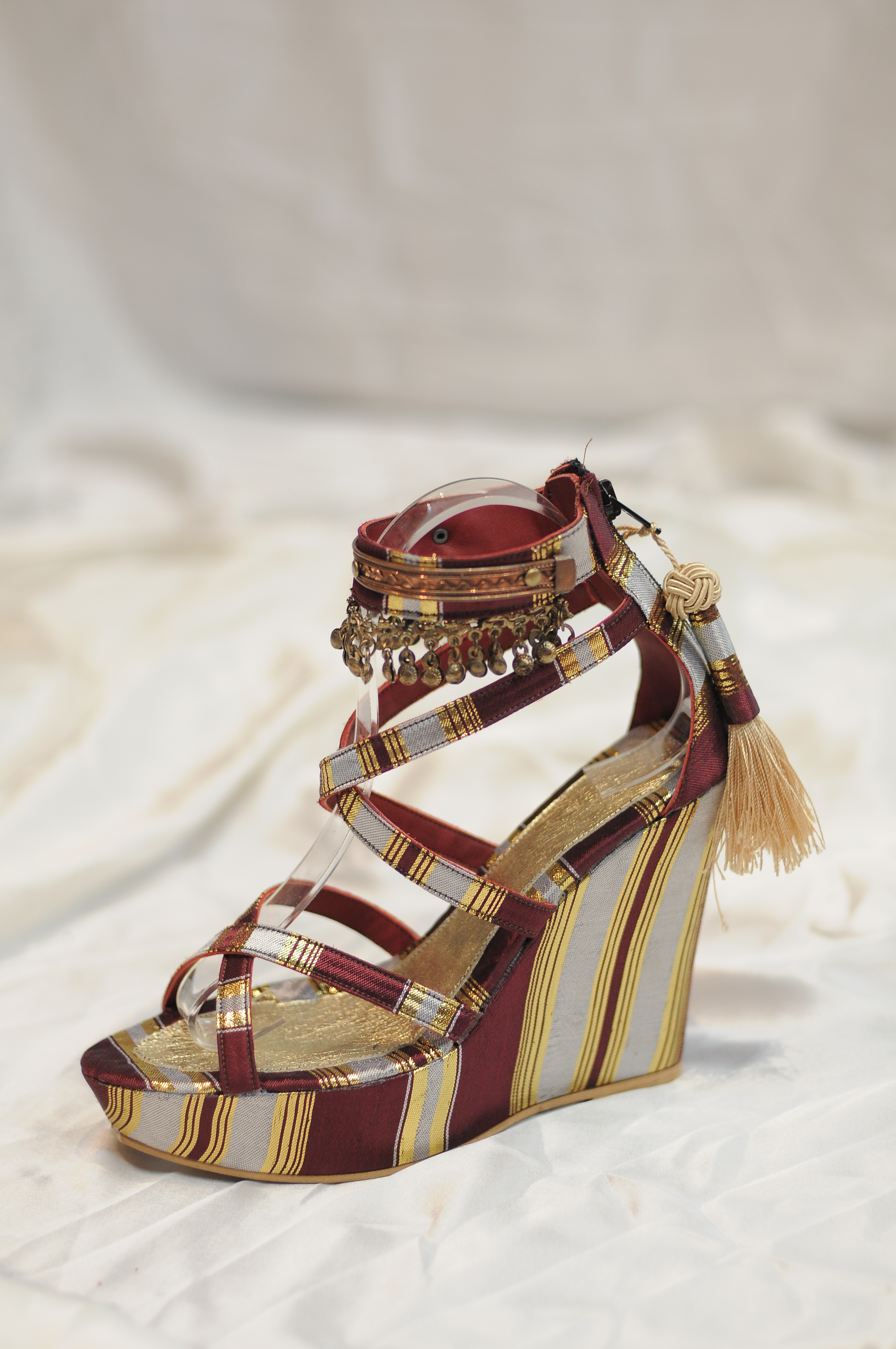
Tunisian women's shoes

Women's clothing is much more diverse than that of men. In the towns, the vast majority of young women have adopted the European style but women of a certain age, even in urban areas, often wrap a sefseri, white veil of silk or fine wool that covers the head with a blouse and baggy pants. These figures of women wearing sefseri is engrained in the traditional culture of Tunisia as much as the blue and white houses of Sidi Bou Said. In rural areas, women still wear brightly colored dresses, often in the Berber style and made of blue or red cotton, representing their region or their village. The fabric is opened on the side and is held at the waist with a belt and at the shoulders by two clasps. Women of all ages typically wear a massive amount of jewelry with the clothing and it is common to see women with tens, even hundreds of gold sovereigns, necklaces and other trimmings around their necks and from the sides of the headdress.

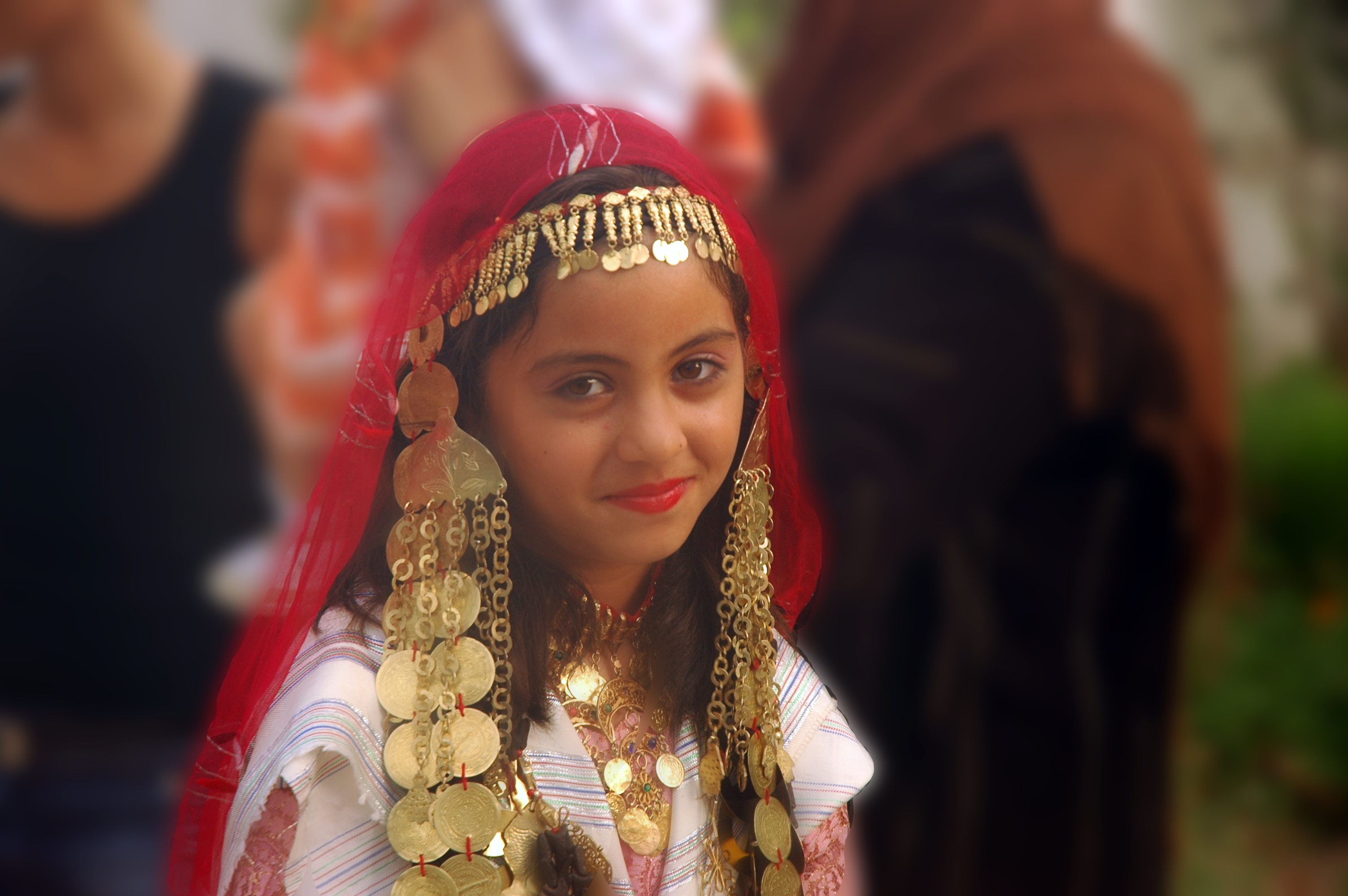
A young woman at a wedding in Djerba

The festive ceremonial costumes differ somewhat across regions. In the Sahel, the centerpiece of the ceremonial dress is a dress draped in wool or cotton, drawn to a bodice embroidered with silk and silver, a velvet jacket decorated with gold, lace pants and a silk belt. Until the middle of the nineteenth century, the brides of the wealthy aristocracy of Tunis often wore a Kaftan cut in velvet, brocade or silk and richly embroidered with gold and enriched with precious stones. Nowadays, some marrying in Sousse and Hammamet still wear a kaftan with elbow-length sleeves, an open front, and varying in length from the knee to the mid calf. The richness and originality of the costumes are typically based less on the cut or the fabric as they are on woven patterns or embroidery.

Wearing the hijab is not widespread in Tunisia although the country has seen a relative increase since the early 2000s. Indeed, the state prohibited it in schools and in the government offices.

Among other cultural and artistic traditions of women's adornment, jewellery of the Berber cultures made of silver, beads and other applications was a common trait of Berber/Amazigh identities especially on the island of Djerba up to the mid-20th century.

=== Oral traditions ===
Until the beginning of the twentieth century, Tunisia was characterized by the existence of a popular culture of oral narratives and puppet shows (marionettes). The narrator, known under the terms of Rawi, or fdaoui meddah was highly respected and appreciated by both the Islamic elite and by the popular classes. Often itinerant, traveling from city to city on foot, they used a bendir, flute and some dolls as an accompaniment. The performance would often include the technique of imitating various characters in the context of Halqa, when two or three other narrators are involved and invite the public to participate. Other forms of narrative are the stories told by the cyclic meddah, the character of boussadia and Stambali shows, both of which are linked to communities from sub-Saharan Africa.

The narratives are institutionalized into different types: Nadira, the Hikaye, the Qissa and Khurafi. The Nadira (story), as well as recitations of the Koran was considered the oral genre par excellence by the Tunisian elite and working classes. It consists of cycles, relating a vast repertoire of stories based on vulgar but intelligent and witty character named Jha. Other narrators specialize in Hikaye or Hikayat, a Tunisian term to describe the epic sagas that recall the history of Tunisian towns and villages, particularly from the eleventh century. The latter emphasize the female characters, in which the character of Zazi represents the archetype of Tunisian women, and are a fundamental part of oral tradition as they include elements of local Arab epics. As for the Qissa, it can be defined in terms of classical Koranic stories. Didactic in nature, it is considered part of Arab-Islamic religious literature Finally, the Khurafi is the most imaginative and popular oral tradition of Tunisia. Functioning as a kind of collective memory, it results from an interaction between the narrators and the public.

The puppet called karakouz, has been present in North Africa from the fourteenth century, and the Teatro dei Pupi (originating in Sicily), enjoyed popularity until the early twentieth century. The performances took place during the month of Ramadan in Halfaouine, a district of Tunis. Karakouz was once played in Turkish until the beginning of the nineteenth century before moving to the Tunisian dialect. The main characters are lively and include officials, a smoker of hashish, the French Madama, Salbi, Nina and ethnic Albanians amongst others. This type of show relies heavily on double entendres, puns, satire, black comedy and caricature. Among the themes addressed are superstition, sexuality or women. The Teatro dei Pupi, executed in Tunisian dialect, account for its three main characters: Nina the Jew, Nekula the Maltese and Ismail Pasha, a valiant warrior who fought against the Christian kings.

== Gender roles ==
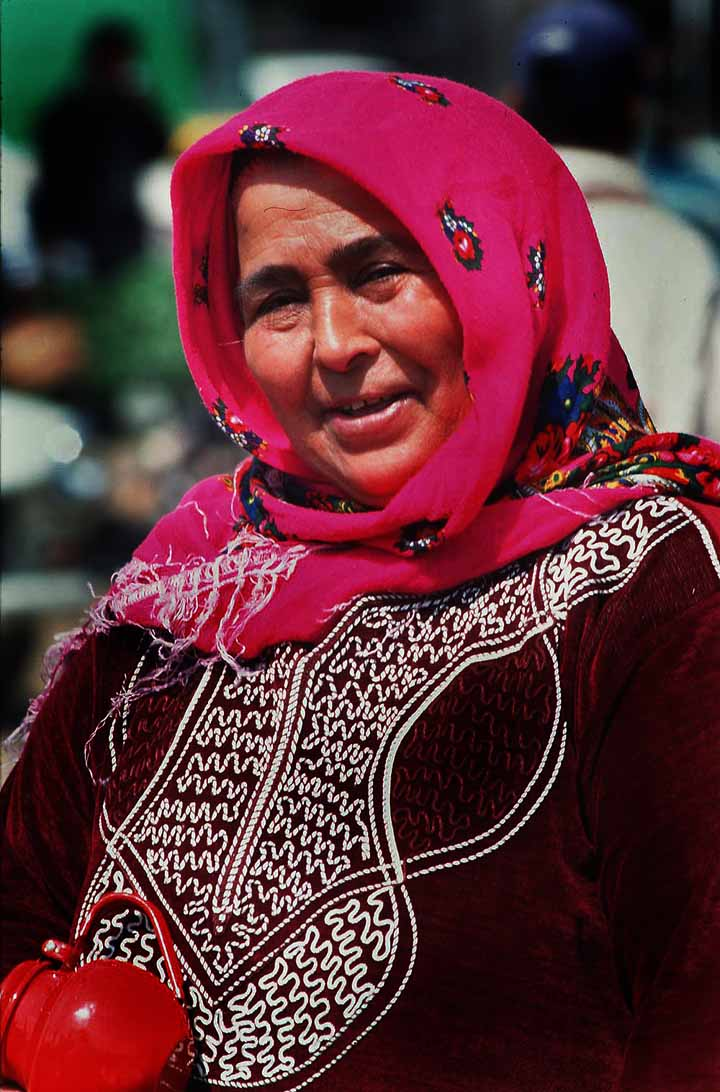
Tunisian woman

Gradually after independence, gender roles and behavioral norms views start to change in Tunisian culture with the development of gender equality inside the society. In 1957 the Code of Personal Status (CSP) came into force, which gives women a new status, unprecedented in the Arab-Muslim world. This code establishes in particular the principle of equality between man and woman in terms of citizenship, forbade polygamy, allows women to divorce, established the minimum age for marriage at 15 for women and 18 for men and requires the consent of both spouses as a rule of validity of any marriage. Later, in 1964, the minimum age for marriage was advanced to 17 years for women and 20 years for men. Later, on the 50th anniversary of the CSP, President Zine el-Abidine Ben Ali decided to unify this age for young men and women in 2007.

Today, the position of women in Tunisia is among the most privileged in North Africa, and can be compared to that of European women. In 2002, the United Nations Committee on the Elimination of Discrimination against Women commended Tunisia for "its great strides forward in promoting equality between men and women". Nevertheless, in rural places where life to some degree remains traditional, Tunisian women still have a long way to go to reach genuine equality. The man is still considered the head of family and inheritance is completely unequal.

The official government policies and programs for decades has strongly emphasized on gender equality and on promoting social development, translating into concrete results. According to latest figures, women make up 26% of the working population and more than 10,000 women are heads of businesses. At the same time, over one third of the approximately 56,000 graduates emerging annually from Tunisian universities are girls. On November 1, 1983, President Habib Bourguiba appointed the first two women ministers: Fethia Mzali (Family and Promotion of Women) and Souad Yaacoubi (Public Health) as leaders. Today the proportions of female representation in legislative and advisory bodies are: 22.7% in the Chamber of Deputies, over 15% in the Chamber of Advisors, over 27% in municipal councils, 18% in the Economic and Social Council, 13.3% in the Higher Council of the Judiciary, 12% among ministry departmental staff. In some areas, women outnumber men, for instance in the pharmaceutical sector women represent more than 72% of all Tunisian Pharmacists. In addition, Tunisian Women are present in key national domains such Education where they constitute half of the educational body and 40% of university professors.

== Attitudes towards minority groups ==
=== The LGBTQ+ community ===
Although Tunisia is considered to be one of the more modern countries in the Arab world, homosexuality is still considered a criminal offense. Under Article 230 of the penal code of 1913, male or female acts of homosexuality are forbidden in the Republic of Tunisia and penalized by 2–3 years of imprisonment.

=== The Black community ===
Despite Tunisia being an African country, racism and acts of hate crime are still prominent. It was only recently that Tunisia criminalized racial discrimination. In 2018 Law 50 or Loi 50 was passed after the society's long term denial of the existence of racism.

=== Family life ===
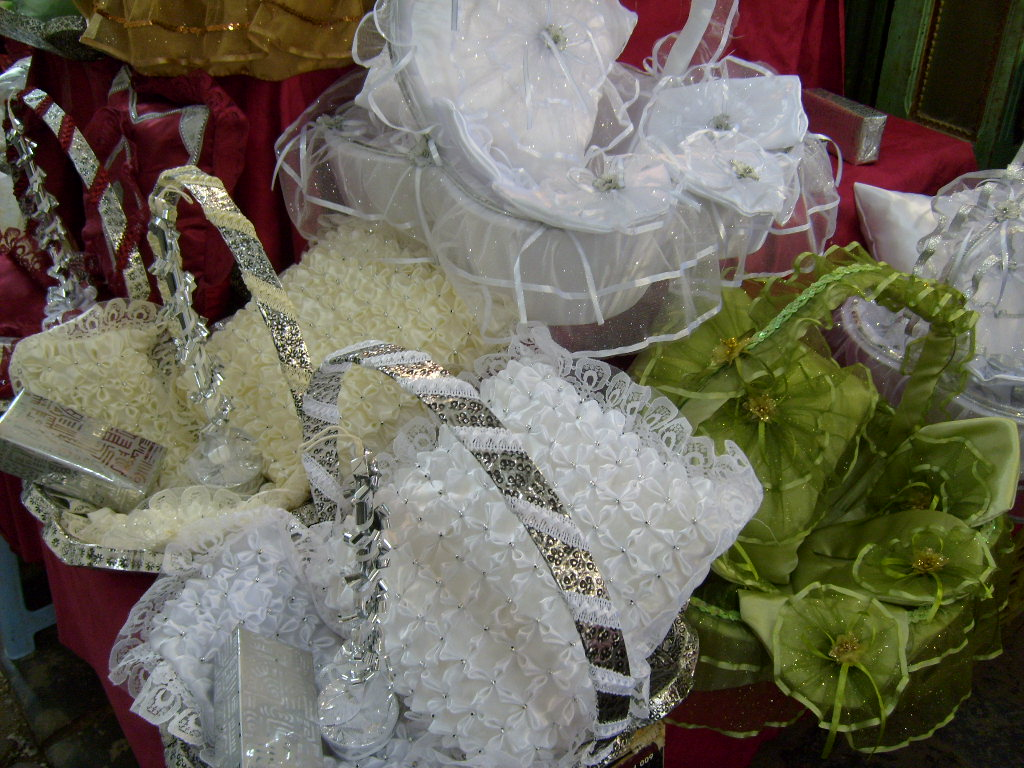
Tunisian wedding

In the field of marriage, partners may be selected by agreement between the family or an individual selection. Mothers often go in search of a bride for their son. Once a commitment is made it usually follows a series of visits between the two families, but disputes can lead to a rupture of the agreement. The wedding ceremony itself involves the passage of the bride to the house of her husband who waits outside. After consummation of the marriage it is followed by a period of isolation of the couple.

The Tunisian household is based on the patriarchal model where the man is placed in the dominant role. Most households are based upon the model of the nuclear family within which the tasks are assigned according to age and sex and personal skills. Developments in education and employment, however, have somewhat altered this situation.

== Gastronomy ==
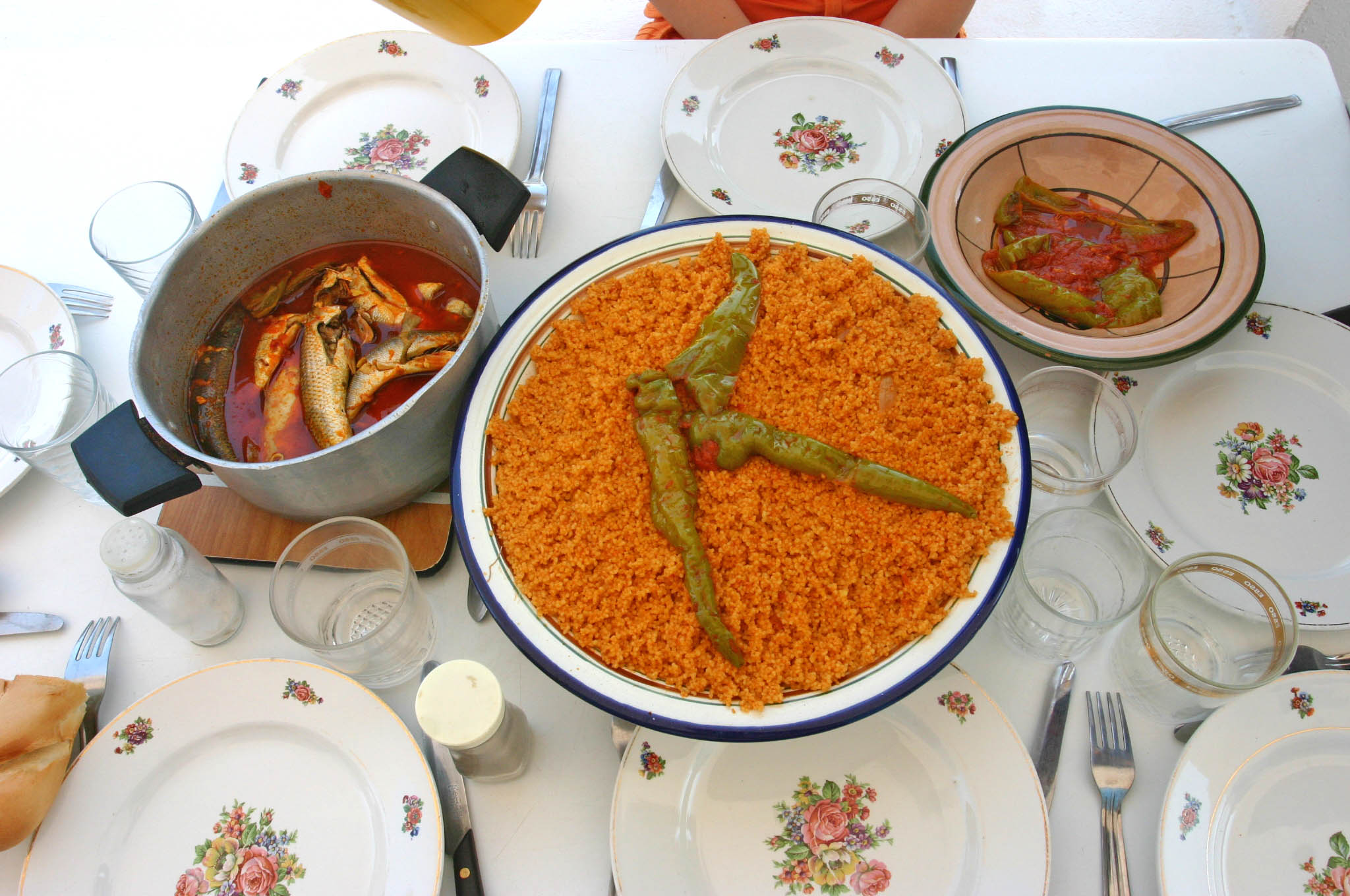
Couscous with Kerkennah fish

Tunisian cuisine is a culinary tradition blending Maghrebi cuisine and Mediterranean cuisine. Its distinctive spicy fieriness comes from neighbouring Mediterranean countries and the many civilizations who have ruled Tunisian land: Phoenician, Arab, Turkish, and the native Berber people. Tunisian food uses a variety of ingredients and in different ways. The main dish that is served in Tunisia is Couscous, made of minuscule grains that are cooked and usually served with meat and vegetables. In cooking they also use a variety of flavors such as: olive oil, aniseed, coriander, cumin, caraway, cinnamon, saffron, mint, orange blossom, and rose water.

Many of the cooking styles and utensils began to take shape when the ancient tribes were nomads. Nomadic people adapted their cooking according to the cookware they had. A tagine is the name of a conical-lidded pot, and today a dish cooked in this pot is also called a tagine.

Like all countries in the Mediterranean basin, Tunisia offers a "sun cuisine", based mainly on olive oil, spices, tomatoes, seafood (a wide range of fish) and meat from rearing (lamb).

=== Ingredients ===
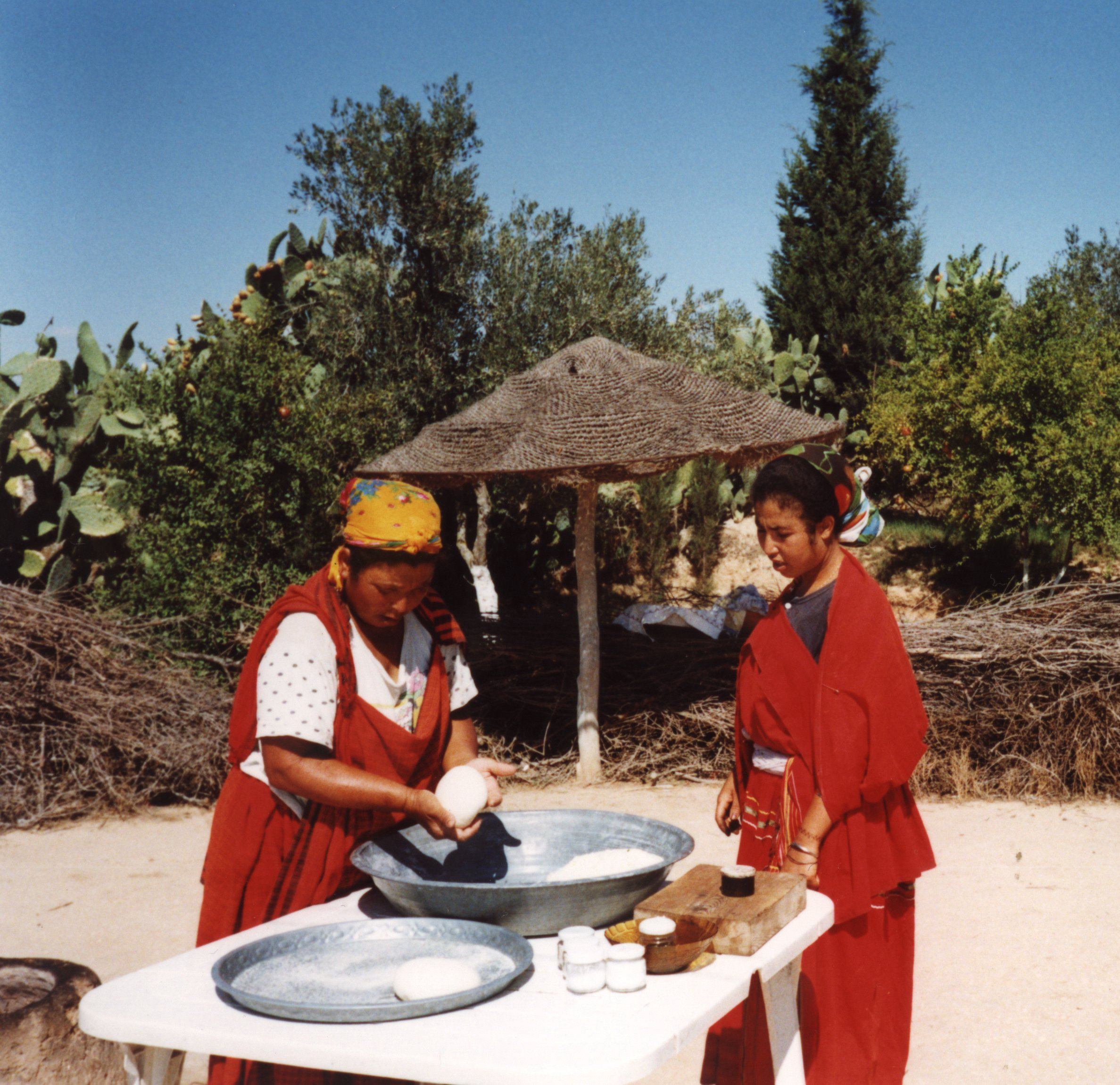
Traditional Tunisian bread being made

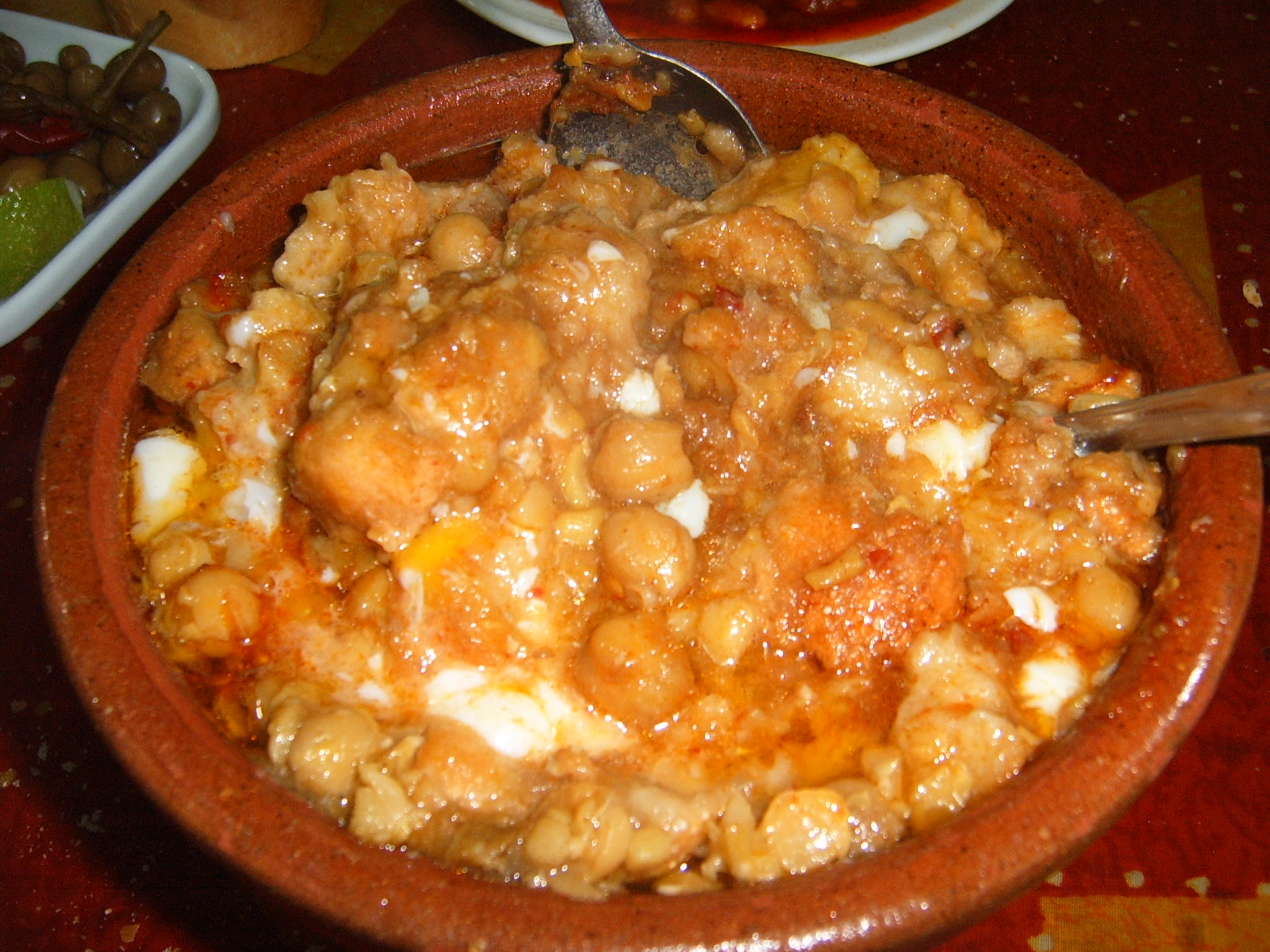
Lablabi

Unlike other North African cuisine, Tunisian food is quite spicy. A popular condiment and ingredient which is used extensively Tunisian cooking, harissa is a hot red pepper sauce made of red chili peppers and garlic, flavoured with coriander, cumin, olive oil and often tomatoes. There is an old wives' tale that says a husband can judge his wife's affections by the amount of hot peppers she uses when preparing his food. If the food becomes bland then a man may presume that his wife no longer loves him. However, when the food is prepared for guests the hot peppers are often toned down to suit the possibly more delicate palate of the visitor. Like harissa or chili peppers, the tomato is also an ingredient that cannot be separated from the cuisine of Tunisia. Tuna, eggs, olives and various varieties of pasta, cereals, herbs and spices are also ingredients which are featured prominently in Tunisian cooking.

Tabil is a word in Tunisian Arabic meaning "seasoning" and refers to a particular Tunisian spice mix, although earlier it meant ground coriander. Paula Wolfert makes the plausible claim that tabil is one of the spice mixes brought to Tunisia by Muslims expelled from Andalusia in 1492 after the fall of Granada. Today tabil, closely associated with the cooking of Tunisia, features garlic, cayenne pepper, caraway and coriander seeds pounded in a mortar and then dried in the sun and is often used in cooking beef or veal.

Because of its long coastline and numerous fishing ports, Tunisia often serves an abundant, varied, and exceptionally fresh supply of fish in its restaurants. Diners can have their fish simply grilled and served filleted or sliced with lemon juice and a little olive oil. Fish can also be baked, fried in olive oil, stuffed, seasoned with cumin (kamoun). Squid, cuttlefish, and octopus are often served in hot crispy batter with slices of lemon, as a cooked salad or stuffed and served with couscous.

== Sports ==
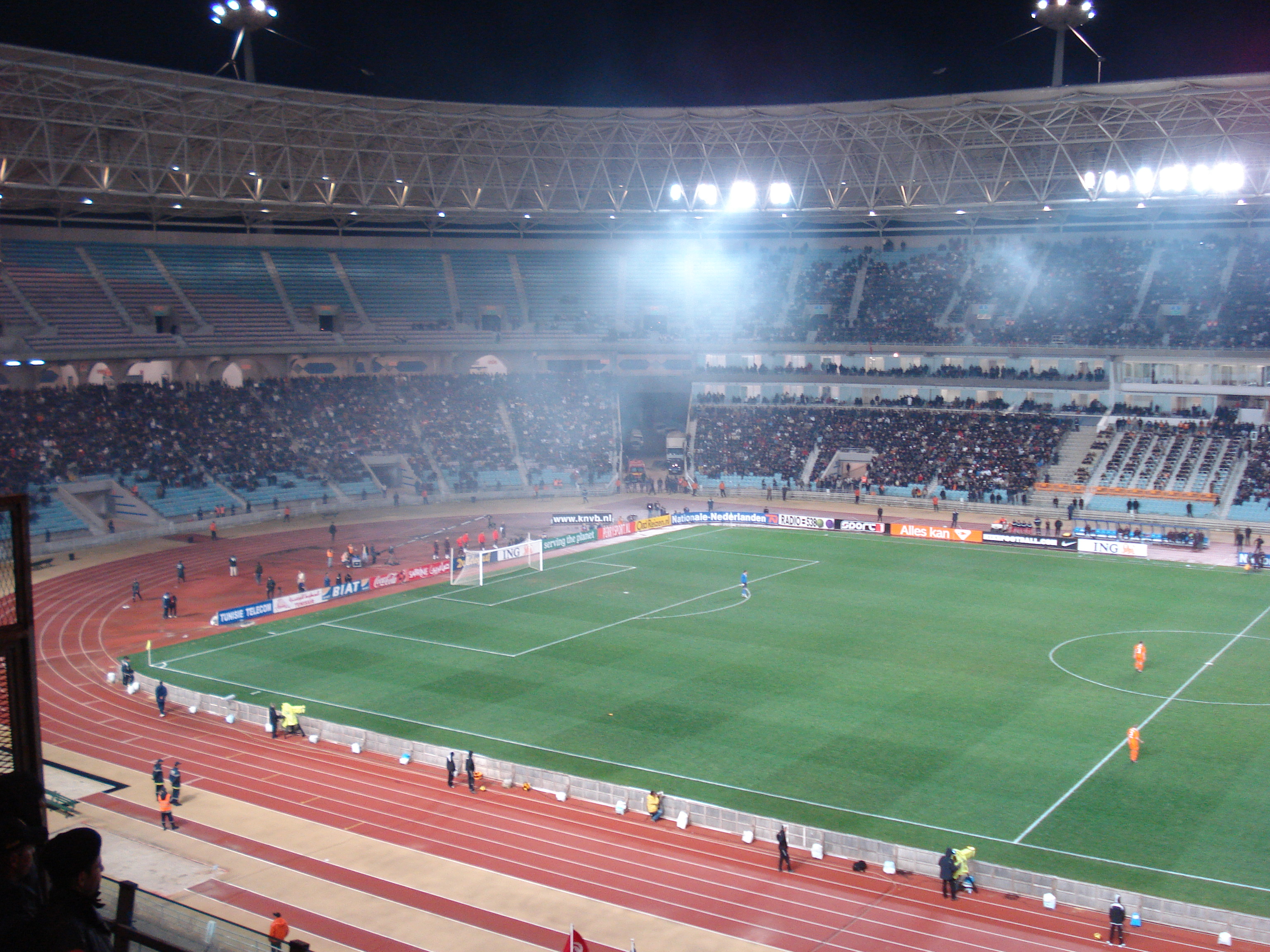
Stade 7 November de Radès

Football (European style) is the most popular sport in Tunisia. The Ligue Professionelle 1 has 14 teams that compete against one another for a trophy, also a chance to qualify for the Champions league of the African Cup of Nations. The Tunisian national football team won the African Cup of Nations in the year 2004.

However, sports like volleyball (nine national team championship wins in Africa) and handball (ten national team championship wins in Africa) are also among the sports most represented. Handball is the second most popular sport in Tunisia. In 2005, Tunisia held the 2005 World Men's Handball Championship and won fourth place in the competition. Other notable sports include rugby union, martial arts (taekwondo, judo, and karate), athletics, and tennis. Other major sports like cycling are less represented in contrast, because of lack of infrastructure and equipment but competitors still compete in the Tour de Tunisia.

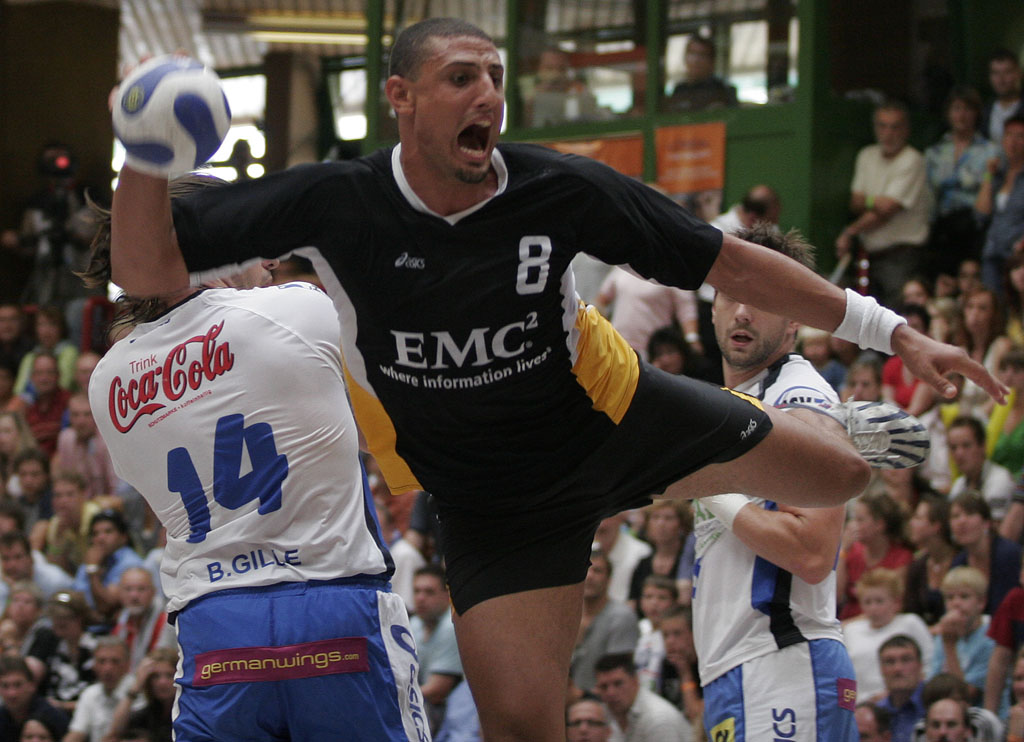
Wissem Hmam

The Tunisian sports year is punctuated by major competitions such as the championships in football, handball, volleyball, and basketball. The country also organizes international competitions. Thus, the first edition of the FIFA World Cup Under-20 was held in Tunisia in 1977, the final stages of the African Cup of Nations in 1965, 1994, and 2004, and the last edition was won by the national team.

In May 2007, the country had 1,673 registered sports clubs whose main assets are in football (250) and taekwondo (206). Then come karate and its derivatives (166), wheelchair sports (140), handball (85), athletics (80), judo (66) kung fu (60), kickboxing (59), basketball (48), bowls (47), table tennis (45), volleyball (40) boxing (37), swimming (31), and tennis (30).

== Cultural policy ==
The political culture of Tunisia is governed by the Ministry of Culture and Heritage Preservation, directed by Abderraouf El Basti. This department, created on December 11, 1961, is, according to the decree n ° 2005-1707 of June 6, 2005, "responsible, under the general policy of the state to run national choices in the fields of culture and heritage preservation and establish plans and programs to promote these areas ".

In 1999, the budget allocated to 0.6% to culture and reached 1.25% in 2009 and is set to reach 1.5% in 2010. 50% of this increase is linked to a policy of decentralization of culture through the promotion in the areas of cultural institutions such as houses of culture, cultural committees and associations. During 2007, seven libraries were established and 30 public libraries managed. Ten houses of culture were under construction, half completed in 2008, and another 40 houses are under maintenance. The year 2008 was also proclaimed "national year of translation".

However, while Kairouan's ambition is to become the "capital of Islamic culture" in 2009, MPs criticize some of the poor quality of artistic productions. Some regret the delay in the excavation of sites such as Salakta or El Haouaria and criticize the dilapidated state of some buildings, particularly that of Borj Zouara and Bab Saadoun. Moreover, the Tunisian museums should, according to some, be the subject of more attention, notably by addressing the problem of low attendance caused by the high cost of tickets.

== See also ==
- Art and politics in post-2011 Tunisia
- List of Tunisian artists
