= List of Tunisian artists =

The following list of Tunisian artists (in alphabetical order by last name) includes artists of various genres, who are notable and are either born in Tunisia, of Tunisian descent or who produce works that are primarily about Tunisia.

== B ==
- Néjib Belkhodja (1933–2007), Tunisian painter, of Turkish heritage
- Amar Ben Belgacem (1979–2010), French-born Tunisian self-taught painter
- Khaled Ben Slimane (born 1951), ceramicist
- Meriem Bouderbala (born 1960), painter, photographer
- Abdelfattah Boussetta (born 1947), sculptor, painter

== C ==
- Jacob Chemla (1858–1938), Tunisian Jewish ceramicist, translator, journalist; in late life he lived in the U.S.

== D ==
- André Djaoui, painter, film director, film and stage producer, screenplay writer
- Hichem Driss (born 1968), photographer

== F ==
- Ammar Farhat (1911–1987), painter; members of the School of Tunis
- Safia Farhat (1924–2004), designer, painter, ceramicist, upholstery, decorative artist; pioneer of visual arts in Tunisia

== G ==
- Jellel Gasteli (born 1958), photographer
- Abdelaziz Gorgi (1928–2008), painter, educator, founder of a painting school

== H ==
- Ahmed Hajeri (born 1948), painter; lived in France

== I ==
- Inkman (born 1990), painter, muralist, calligraffiti artist, graphic designer

== K ==
- Nadia Kaabi-Linke (born 1978), installation artist; she is of Ukrainian and Tunisian heritage and lives in Berlin
- Mouna Karray (born 1970), photographer, video artist
- Hédi Khayachi (1882–1948), painter; official portraitist of the Husainid court
- Sabiha Al Khemir (born 1959), illustrator, writer
- Nadia Khiari (born 1973), cartoonist, painter, graffiti artist, art teacher
- Paul Klee (1879–1940), Swiss-German painter; visited Tunisia in 1914 and left a lasting impression

== M ==
- August Macke (1887–1914), German painter; visited Tunisia in 1914 and left a lasting impression
- Nja Mahdaoui (born 1937), calligrapher, graphic artist
- Khookha McQueer (born 1987), photographer, drag artist, first trans women known to the general public in Tunisia
- Hatem El Mekki (1918–2003), painter
- Leïla Menchari (1927–2020), fashion designer, interior decorator
- Louis Moilliet (1880–1962), Swiss painter and stained glass designer; visited Tunisia in 1914 and left a lasting impression

== S ==
- Mourad Salem (born 1956), painter; of French and Tunisian-Turkish heritage and lives in Paris
- Mahmoud Sehili (1931–2015), painter
- Aïcha Snoussi (born 1989), printmaker, and drawer; queer and lives in Paris

== T ==
- Mahmoud Tounsi (1944–2001), author, painter
- Hedi Turki (1922–2019), Tunisian abstract painter of Turkish heritage
- Yahia Turki (1903–1969), Tunisian painter of Turkish and Djerbian heritage; described as the "father of Tunisian painting"
- Zoubeir Turki (1924–2009), Tunisian painter and sculptor of Turkish heritage

== R ==
- Alexandre Roubtzoff (1884–1949), Russian-born French painter who specialized in Orientalist scenes; he lived in Tunisia most of his life

== Z ==
- Ali Zenaïdi (born 1950), painter

== See also ==
- African art
- Tunisian art
- List of Tunisian Americans
- List of Tunisian women artists
- List of Tunisian actresses
