= Armand Vergeaud =

French painter

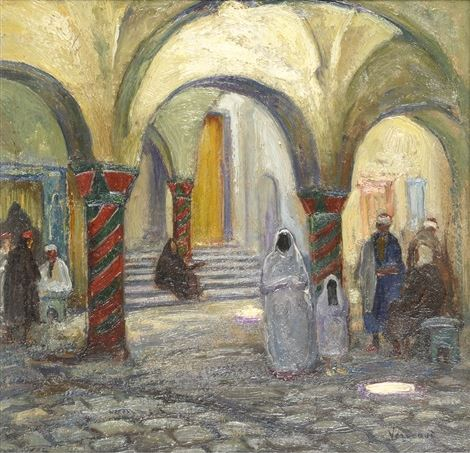
The Souk El Berka, Tunis

Jean Antoine Armand Vergeaud (3 August 1876, Angoulême - 1949, Tunis?) was a French Orientalist painter.

== Biography ==
He studied at the École nationale supérieure des beaux-arts, under Gustave Moreau, Fernand Cormon and François Flameng.

In 1912, he moved to Tunis. He was named Director of the Institut Supérieur des Beaux-Arts de Tunis in 1927, a position he held until his death. Among his notable students there, one may mention Aly Ben Salem, Yahia Turki, Geneviève Gavrel, Abdelaziz Gorgi and Antonio Corpora.

He sent most of his works to be exhibited at the Salon des Artistes Français in Paris.

In 1932, he was named a Knight in the Legion of Honor.

He was married to Eva Peyronnet, daughter of the sculptor, Émile Peyronnet (1872-1956), who was also from Angoulême.
