= Art and politics in post-2011 Tunisia =

The culture of Tunisia is thousands of years old, but the 2011 Tunisian revolution brought about important changes to the way art and politics interact in Tunisia. Censorship under the dictatorship of former president Zine El Abidine Ben Ali was replaced with unprecedented freedom of expression and questions on how to use it. The newfound vigorousness of the arts in Tunisia and the new challenges artists have to address echo those in other countries affected by the Arab Spring, especially Egypt.

== Background ==
=== Art before the Tunisian revolution ===
Artists found ways to circumvent or avoid censorship of their work before the downfall of Zine El Abidine Ben Ali's regime. Tunisian collaborative painting, for instance, is an art form created in Tunisia during the 1980s that allows several artists to collaborate on one piece without prior discussion or planning. Although the Tunisian art market was relatively small and inward looking compared to the ones in other North African countries like Morocco or Algeria, there was proof of an evolving, dynamic art scene even before the revolution, with the successes of Galerie El Marsa or Le Violon Bleu.

Still, according to Khadija Hamdi: "In Tunisia, with the absence, among other things, of a cultural policy specific to the art market, and the lack of the appropriate cultural and ideological conditions, the emergence of a "system" of "contemporary art" itself (in the Western sense) has not yet been possible."

Certain artistic institutions such as the school of music in El Kef were closed by the regime as potential hotbeds of discord.

=== Art during and after the Tunisian revolution ===
Works of art that used the revolution as a subject proliferated after the downfall of the former regime, both to emulate iconic revolutionary symbols and to explore the complex challenges the country still faced. The revolution saw an upshot in the number of artistic manifestations such as exhibits, most notably in the field of photography. Other art forms such as music also thrived after the revolution.

Remnants from the older regime and from the demonstrations themselves were also used by artists during the revolution, by transforming a police station into an art gallery or transforming burnt out cars into works of art, for instance. Villas belonging to the Trabelsis, the family of Zine El Abidine Ben Ali's wife Leïla Ben Ali, became the target of graffiti artists soon after the regime's downfall.

==== Street art ====
In the months during and following the revolution, street art played a major role by reclaiming public spaces that used to be controlled by the government and by letting artists and ordinary citizens express themselves freely for the first time in years. Individual artists or groups like the student-run Ahl El Kahf collective used stencils, graffitis and paintings to depict political or revolutionary themes, such as the portrait of Mohamed Bouazizi. In addition to using local revolutionary symbols, street artists also reused Western and Latin American revolutionary icons in the work. Murals were one of the most common form of street art, representing, for instance, people killed during the revolution. In effect, graffiti artists in the Tunisian Revolution founded a "culture of resistance", much like Palestinians' tradition of subversive comic art.

According to Nicholas Korody, "The graffiti of the Tunisian revolution always possesses a revolutionary character in form. That is to say, it existed as a reappropriation of authoritarian-controlled property. It is also notable in that it is the only art form born out of the revolution. While a few artists existed in Tunisia during the Ben Ali regime, their work was quickly covered up and few people knew about the art form. Since the revolution, it has grown massively."

Academic Response

The revolution in Tunisia and its aftermath has prompted much discussion. Tunisian intellectual, Dr. Mohamed-Salah Omri, a fellow at University of Oxford in Modern Arabic literature, has dedicated much of his research to examining the intersections between poetry and revolution, the "Confluency" between Culture, Revolution and Trade Unionism in Tunisia, and the overall challenges of the democratic transition in the country.

== New challenges ==
=== Religious challenges to artistic freedom ===
Despite the end of Zine El Abidine Ben Ali's dictatorship, Tunisian artists have faced new challenges to their artistic freedom, often from groups that have a strict interpretation of Islam. After years of censorship and repression of both the art world and religious identity, the new regime has had to juggle between the two, and tensions have periodically surfaced.

In June 2012 riots erupted against the "Printemps des Arts" exhibit in La Marsa that Salafi groups and others deemed blasphemous, most notably because of one work of art that spelled out God's name using insects. Hundreds were arrested and curfews were imposed. Some radical religious leaders called for the deaths of the artists, who received death threats, and Tunisian minister of culture Mehdi Mabrouk condemned the artists by saying that art should be "beautiful," not "revolutionary," and that the artists were wrong to invoke Islamic imagery. The leader of the ruling Ennahda Movement, Rachid Ghannouchi, said that he condemned violence against individuals or property but also opposed "attacks on the beliefs of Tunisians" and emphasized the need to protect "sacred symbols". Also deemed blasphemous by some was a work of art by Nadia Jelassi, who created an installation of female mannequin busts, cloaked in hijabs and surrounded by stones. Jelassi, a teacher at the Tunis Institute of Fine Arts, was called to appear before a judge and was charged for disturbing public order. Her treatment - police took her fingerprints and a mugshot - sparked an online campaign in defense of free expression. In the aftermath of the incident, the artistic community complained that authorities weren't doing enough to protect them.

Religious hardliners tried and sometimes succeeded to prevent other artistic events from taking place like music festivals and plays. Women artists in particular feared that hardline Muslim pressure would prevent them from working freely.

These tensions led many to feel that "nothing had changed" with regards to the relations between art and politics, as censorship is said to have shifted from being political to being religious and moral. According to Sofiane Ouissi, co-creative director of the Dream City, an art festival that takes place in Tunis' medina: "Under the old censorship and oppression - it was conspicuous; we could locate it; it was clear for us. [...] But now, since it was displaced, it has come into the public space, you never know where dictatorship is going to emerge."

=== Political challenges to artistic freedom ===
Artists have also been targeted by the new regime. In November 2012, Chahine Berriche and Oussama Bouagila, two Tunisian graffiti artists, were arrested for writing "the people want rights for the poor" and "the poor are the living-dead in Tunisia" on the wall of a university. The two artists were members of the Zwelwa art activist collective and were charged with breaching the state of emergency, writing on public property and disturbing public order.

=== Attempts to address challenges ===
Tunisian street artists eL Seed reacted to these tensions between the artistic and religious communities by painting verses of the Quran preaching tolerance onto the Jara mosque in his hometown of Gabès. He also said that the threat of censorship was exaggerated in certain circles: "I feel that there is a lot of hypocrisy in Tunisia at the moment, and unfortunately many artists relish censorship, or the fear of it, if it brings them international recognition. I personally have not felt any real threats of censorship."

== New art institutions and organizations ==
The B’chira Art Center, located near Sidi Thabet between Tunis and Bizerte, opened in July 2011. The center aimed to develop contemporary art by providing a space for artists to produce and show work, as well as an experimental laboratory to research techniques and introduce children to the art world.

The Carthage National Museum saw the launch of an umbrella program called Carthage Contemporary, part of an increasingly dynamic contemporary art scene in Tunisia.

Also established after the revolution in 2011 was the Tunisian Federation of the Visual Arts (Fédération Tunisienne des Arts Plastiques), a grouping of young artist associations aimed at defending and promoting visual arts in Tunisia. These goals are shared by two preexisting organizations, the Association of Tunisian Visual Artists (Union des Artistes Plasticiens Tunisiens) and the Union of Visual Arts Professions (Syndicat des Métiers des Arts Plastiques), created in 2009.

== International influences and projects ==
=== In Tunisia ===
French street artist and photographer JR launched the first phase of his Inside Out Project in Tunisia, where native photographers displayed large scale portraits of ordinary Tunisians around the country instead of the formerly ubiquitous pictures of the president. The project fostered discussion with Tunisians, some of whom understood and appreciated the project, while others did not think art should play a political role by using public spaces and complained that the previous regime already imposed pictures upon them all the time.

Algerian-French artist ZOO Project also celebrated the revolution by placing hundreds of life-size figures around the city, representing the Tunisians who revolted and in particular those who died during the revolution.

=== Abroad ===
Tunisian artists also explored political and revolutionary themes in exhibits abroad. In France, the Institut du Monde Arabe hosted two events. In May 2011, an exhibit called "Dégage" (French for "get lost") showcased photographs of the revolution by a Tunisian photography collective of the same name. A second exhibit that ran from January to April 2012 called "Dégagements – Tunisia One Year On" showed work from Tunisian artists and others from the Middle East to celebrate the anniversary of the revolution. It included paintings, graffiti, pictures and sculptures by artists like cartoonist Nadia Kiari and photographer Hichem Driss.

In the United States, Tunisian student Ikram Lakhdhar curated an exhibit at Connecticut College called "Moments of Freedom: Revolutionary Art from China, South Africa and Tunisia" in April 2013 with work by contemporary Tunisian photographers Wassim Grimen, Omar Sfayhi, and Youssef Ben Ammar and internationally renown artists such as Diane Victor, Zhang Hongtu, Rajaa Gharbi and William Kentridge.

In Germany, the ifa Gallery in Stuttgart hosted an exhibit from January to March 2013 called "Rosy Future" on the future of contemporary art in Tunisia after the revolution.

== See also ==
- Arab Spring
- Tunisian revolution
- Culture of Tunisia
