= Khaled Lasram =

Tunisian painter and art historian (1949–2026)

- Born: 1 August 1949; Tunis, French protectorate of Tunisia
- Died: 6 August 2026 (aged 77)
- Education: Paris 1 Panthéon-Sorbonne University
- Occupations: Painter; Art historian

Khaled Lasram (1 August 1949 – 6 August 2026) was a Tunisian painter and art historian.

== Biography ==
Born in Tunis on 1 August 1949, Lasram studied at the Institut technologique d'art, d'architecture et d'urbanisme de Tunis from 1971 to 1975, when he also worked in the shop of Hedi Turki. The year of his graduation, he took part in an "emerging painters" exhibition. He earned a doctorate from Paris 1 Panthéon-Sorbonne University in 1981 with a thesis titled Les Peintres orientalistes français en Égypte (1869-1914). According to his blog, his thesis was published in the journal IBLA. He served as a professor at the Tunis Institute of Fine Arts, from which he retired in 2014.

Khaled Lasram died on 6 August 2026, at the age of 77.
