= Mahmoud Messadi =

Tunisian author and government official (1911–2004)

- محمود المسعدي
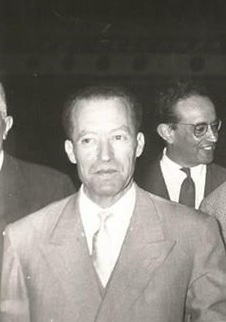
- Messadi in 1978
- Born: 28 January 1911; Tazarka, Tunisia
- Died: 16 December 2004 (aged 93)
- Occupations: Novelist and intellectual

Mahmoud Messadi (Tunisian Arabic: محمود المسعدي; 28 January 1911– 16 December 2004) was a Tunisian author and intellectual who also served as Minister of Education and Minister of Culture. Also, he is a prominent Tunisian novelist.

== Life and education ==
Messadi was born in Tazarka, Nabeul Governorate, Tunisia. His education began in the village Quranic school, where he memorized part of the Qur’an before starting primary school in Korba.

He then completed high school in the Sadiqi Institute in Tunis in 1933. In the same year, he enrolled at the Sorbonne University in Paris to study Arabic language and literature. He graduated in 1936 and then began preparing his first PhD dissertation on Abu Nuwas, as well as a second on the rhythm of classical Arabic poetry. He finished the first dissertation, but the Second World War prevented him from defending it. The second was later published in Arabic and French. He started teaching at the Islamic Studies center in Paris in 1952.

== Career in government ==
In addition to teaching at universities in both Tunisia and France, Messadi was involved in politics. He assumed responsibility for educational affairs in the National Independence Movement, thereby supporting the fight against French colonialism. He also played a leadership role in the teachers' union.

Messadi participated in the negotiations with France for Tunisia's independence in 1955. Following independence, he served as a member of parliament from 1959 until 1981. He was the speaker of the Chamber of Deputies from 1981 to 1986.

Messadi worked with Tunisia's first president, Habib Bourguiba, on education policy. He serve as Bourgiba's minister of education from 1958–1968 and as minister of culture from 1973–1976. This era in Tunisia was known for far-reaching educational reforms under the newly independent government, and many of these policies came to be known as the "Messaadi plan." Among the core tenets of this plan was an expansion of primary school education.

In addition to these responsibilities, Messadi worked with UNESCO and Alexo as well as the Arabic Language Academy in Jordan.

== Literary career ==
Messadi established two magazines: al-Mabahith (Investigations) and al-Hiyaat al-Thiqaafiyya (Cultural Life), which is still issued by the Ministry of Culture.

Messadi wrote his important works between 1939 and 1947. These works reveal the Qur'anic influence on his intellectual and belief formation and his style. His works also reveal his knowledge of the work of Muslim thinkers of various eras, and especially the ancient Arab literature that had interested him since high school. His speciality was his ability to combine this knowledge of the rich Arabo-Islamic tradition with his extensive knowledge of Western literature and philosophy, particularly French.

One of his most influential works, al-Sudd ('The dam'), was written in 1940 but not published until 1955. The novel tells the story of Ghaylan and his wife Maymuna, who come upon a valley full of people who worship a goddess of drought named Sahhaba. Ghaylan decides to build the people a dam, to give them a reliable source of water and cure them of their superstitions, with disastrous results. This novel is recognized for "the extreme elegance of its language," which is classical yet clear, as displayed in this work: "The high literary quality of Al-Sudd resides in its pristine clarity of expression, its stylistic echos of the Koran, and its skillful recuperation of Tunisian literary heritage."

== Honours ==
- Grand Cross of the Order of Independence (Tunisia)
- Grand Cross of the Order of the Republic (Tunisia)
- Grand Cross of the National Order of Merit of Tunisia
- Grand Cross of the Order of Isabella the Catholic (Spain)
- Commander of the Ordre des Palmes académiques (France)
- Commander of the Order of Intellectual Merit (Morocco)

== Works ==
- Abu Hurairah Said (1939), translated to German in November 2009
- The Dam (1955/1940), translated to German in October 2007
- Birth of the Oblivion (Arabic: مولد النسيان, romanized: Maulid Annisyan, 1945), translated to French in 1993 and to German in 2008
