= Tounsi (surname) =

Tounsi is a surname. Notable people with the surname include:

- Abderrahim Tounsi (1936–2023), Moroccan comedian
- Ali Tounsi (1937–2010), French-born Algerian police chief
- Mahmoud Tounsi (1944–2001), Tunisian author and painter
