= Ahmed Hajeri =

Tunisian painter

- An example of Ahmed Hajeri artwork
- Born: November 16, 1948 (age 77); Tazerka
- Occupation: Painter

Ahmed Hajeri (born November 16, 1948) is a Tunisian painter.

He was born in Tazerka and emigrated to France in 1968 where he met Roland Morand an architect and painter. In 1977, he presented a display at the Galerie Messine de Paris. In 1985 he showcased at the Medina Gallery in Tunis and at the Phyllis Kind Gallery in New York City. He was also responsible for artwork during the 1988 Summer Olympic Games in Seoul.

== Exhibitions ==
=== Main Personal Exhibitions ===
- 1978 - Galerie Messine, Paris
- 1982 - Galerie Messine, Paris
- 1985 - Galerie Médina, Tunis
- 1986 - Phyllis Kind Gallery, New York
- 1992 - Musée de Sidi Bou Saïd, Sidi Bou Saïd
- 1995 - Institut du monde arabe, Paris
- 1997 - Galerie Fanny Guillon-Lafaille, Paris
- 1998 - Biennale d'art contemporain, Dakar
- 1999 - Centre d'art contemporain, Brussels
- 2004 - Galerie Danièle Besseiche, Paris
- 2006 - Kanvas Art Gallery, La Soukra, Tunis
- 2008 - Kanvas Art Gallery, La Soukra, Tunis

=== Main group exhibitions ===
- 1988 - Olympiades des arts, Seoul
- 1992 - Exposition universelle, Séville
- 1999 - Centre Wallonie, Bruxelles
- 2002 - Institut du monde arabe, Paris
- 2018 - Galerie Kalysté la Soukra
- 2022 - Galerie Kalysté la Soukra

== Awards ==
- 1986 - Grand prix national de la peinture, Tunisie
- 1998 - Chevalier de l'ordre du mérite culturel, Tunisie
- 2000 - 3 prix de la ville de Tunis

== Bibliography ==
- Ali Louati, Ahmed Hajeri, éd. Simpact, Tunis, 1997
