= Jellal Ben Abdallah =

Tunisian painter

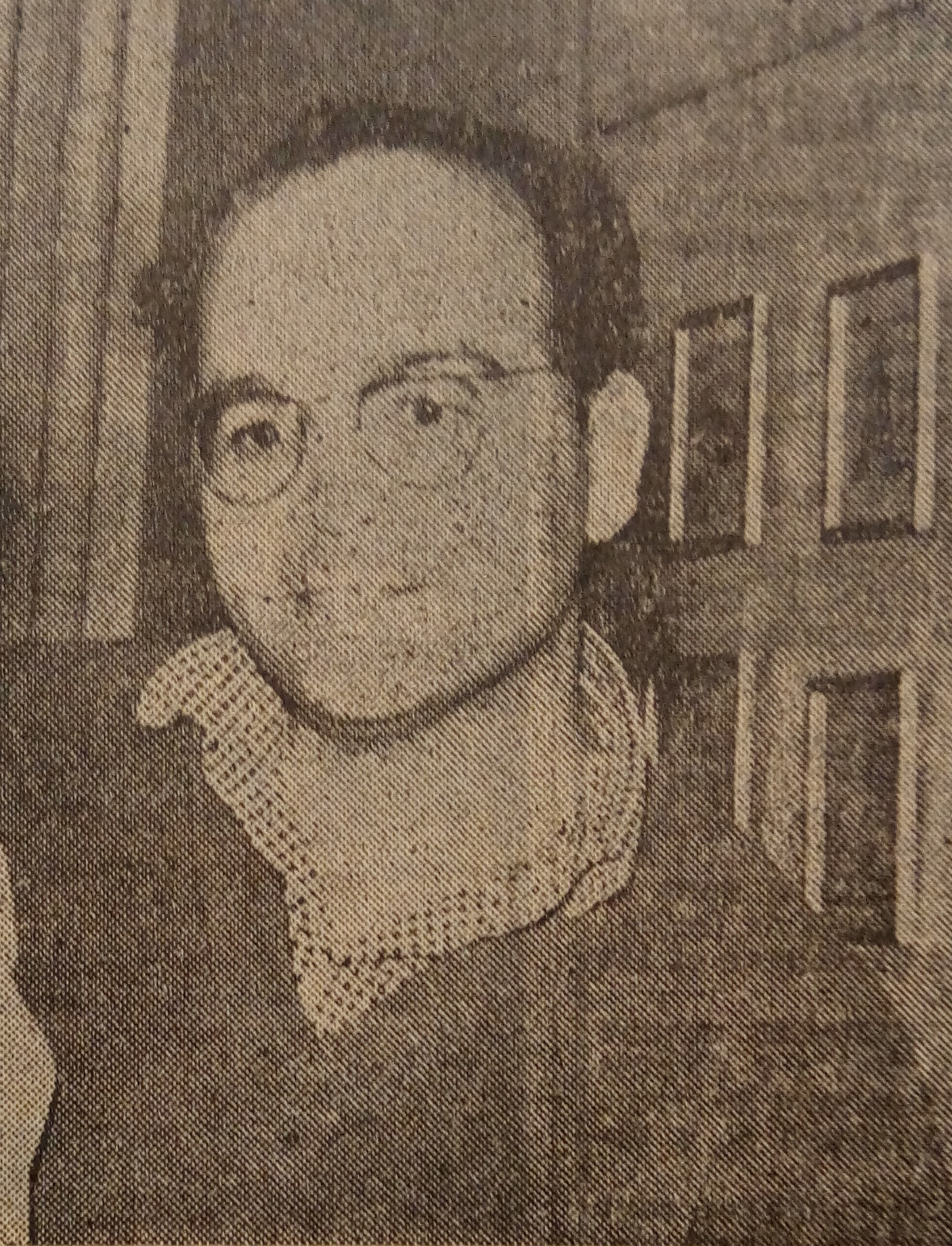
- Born: May 26, 1921; Tunis, Tunisia
- Died: November 9, 2017 (aged 96); Sidi Bou Saïd, Tunisia
- Occupation: Painter

Jellal Ben Abdallah (May 26, 1921 - November 9, 2017) was a Tunisian painter. Three of his paintings are in the permanent collection of Mathaf: Arab Museum of Modern Art in Doha, Qatar.
