= Rachida Triki =

Tunisian philosopher and academic

Rachida Triki, also known as Rachida Boubaker-Triki (born 24 March 1949) is a Tunisian philosopher, art historian, art critic, and art curator. She is a full professor of philosophy at Tunis University, specialized in Aesthetics.

== Biography and career ==
Triki graduated from the University of Paris 1 Pantheon-Sorbonne in 1971. Her thesis was titled, Aesthetics and Politics at the Renaissance, and was directed by Hélène Vedrine. In 1983 she obtained her PhD from University of Paris 1 Pantheon-Sorbonne. In 2001, she obtained a Habilitation in Philosophy from Paris 8 University, under the direction of Patrice Vermeren.

Since 2010, Triki is full Professor of Philosophy at Tunis University.

She is the founder and president of the Tunisian Association of Aesthetics and Poetics (ATEP), the vice president of the International Association of Poetics (SIP), member of the executive board of the Euro-Mediterranean association for Art History and Aesthetics (AEPHAE), and delegate in the executive board of International Association for Aesthetics (IAA).

Triki is also an art critic and a curator specialized in North African Art. In 1994, she has co-produced a series of 24 documentaries about the Tunisian painters in their workplace. She also has been the curator of numerous international art exhibitions in Europe and Africa. She has also been advising visual art foundations and nominating Artists for various international Awards. Currently she is acting as advisor for a Kamel Lazaar Foundation and nominator for Prix Pictet 2013 and for Prince Claus Awards 2013.

She has organized numerous international meetings on the contemporaneous problems of the creation in Arts, and has published books and articles on the subject. She is also a member of editorial boards of “Recherches poïétiques” and “Art’in”.

During the Tunisian revolution 2011, Rachida Triki, as a president of the Tunisian Association of Aesthetics and Poetics initiated an appeal for the democratization of culture, for the support of free and independent art criticism, and for the encouragement of young artists and cultural NGOs.

== Bibliography ==
=== Authored ===
- L'image: Ce que l'on voit, ce que l'on crée (The Image: What is seen, what is created), Larousse, Paris, 2008.
- L'esthétique du temps pictural (The aesthetics of the pictorial time), Tunis, 2001.
- Paintings in Hasdrubal, Tunis 2002 (translated into French, Arabic and German).
- Les femmes peintres en Tunisie (Women painters in Tunisia) CREDIF Tunis 2001.
- L'esthétique et la question du sens (Aesthetic and sense), Arcantères, Paris, 2000
- Lenain, Thierry, ed. (1997). L'Image Deleuze, Foucault, Lyotard [Image in Deleuze, Foucault, Lyotard] (in French). Paris, France: J. Vrin. ISBN 9782711613182.
- Esthétique et politique à la Renaissance (Aesthetic and political in Renaissance), Publications de l'Université de Tunis, Tunis 1986.

=== Edited ===
- Poïètique artistique et citoyenneté , Wassiti Edition, Tunis, 2012
- Le contemporain des arts , Wassiti Edition, Tunis, 2011
- Orient Occident, Les arts dans le prisme exogène (Orient/Occident), Wassiti Edition, Tunis, 2008.
- Poïétique de l’existence, Stratégie des arts contemporains (Contenporain art strategy), Beit elHekma, Tunis, 2008.
- Philosopher en Tunisie aujourd'hui (Doing philosophy in Tunisia today) Revue Rue Descartes n°61, Paris 2008.
- Quelle pensée dans la pratique des arts? (Thinking Arts), ATEP, Tunis, 2007.
- Poïètique de l'existence, Stratégies contemporaines des arts , SONUMED Edition, Tunis, 2006
- Espaces et mémoires (Spaces and Memory), Maghreb Edition, Tunis, 2005.
- Creation, hasard et necessité (Creation, luck and necessity), Tunis, 2003.
- Arts and transcréation (Arts et transcréation), Wassiti, Tunis, 2001.
- Critique et création (Criticism and creation), CPU, Tunis, 2000.
- Création et culture (Creation and culture), Arcantères Paris, 1994.
- Patrimoine et création (Patrimony and creation), Edilis, Lyon, 1992.

== Filmography ==
- In 1994 Rachida Triki has co-produced a series of 24 documentaries for the national Tunisian TV (RTT). Each documentary explores a Tunisian painter's work. It contains interviews of the painter, scenes of the creation process, and critics of art works.

== Exhibitions ==
- 2013: Curator for the Land Art event "De Colline en Colline, 24h pour l’art contemporain" (From hill to hill, 24h for the Contemporary Art), Sidi Bou Saïd / Takrouna / Chénini, Tunisia, Mars 2013.
- 2011: Curator for the exhibition "Photographies contemporaines en Tunisie" (Contemporary photography in Tunisia), National Centre of Living Art, Tunisia, octobre 2011.
- 2010: Curator for North Africa for Dak'Art 2010, The 9th Biennale of Contemporary African Art. Dakar, Senegal.
- 2010: Curator for Contemporary Art exhibition La Part Du Corps , Tunis City Museum
- 2009: Curator for Contemporary Art exhibition Proximity, Tunis City Museum.
- 2008: Co-curators for Bienal Pontevedra of Contemporary Arts, Spain (Artists: Nadia Kaabi, Halim Karabibène, Nicène Kossentini, Mouna Karray, Mouna Jmal and Sana Tamzini).
- 2007: Curator for North Africa, at National Museum of Mali, Bamako, Contact Zone (Artists: Hassen Echair, Dalal Tangour, Ammar Bouras).
- 2006: Curator for Poïétique de l’existence, Hammamet, (Tunisia) (Artists: Abderrazek Sahli, Taïeb Ben Hadj Ahmed, Nicéne Kossentini, Amel Bouslama).
- 2004: Co-curator for Paysages croisés, Centre Culturel Arabe, Paris (Artists: Faten Chouba, Eliane Chiron, Jean Le Gac, Fadoua Dagdoug).
- 2002: Organisation of monographic exhibition for the artist René Passeron, Eros et le tragique, In images (1946 – 2002) in Galerie Hasdrubal, Hammamet, Tunisia
- 2000: Co-curator for Lumières tunisiennes Hôtel de ville, Paris (Artists: Aly Ben Salem, Najib Belkhodja, Ridha Bettaëb).
- 1999: Co-curator for D’ici et de là-bas : miroir tunisien at Espace Alizés, Brussels, (Artists: Mohamed Trigui, Samira Lourini, Nja Mahdaoui, Faouzia Hichri, Adel Magdiche).
- 1998: Organisation of exhibition L’effet Olivier at Moulin Mahjoub, Tébourba Tunisia: (Artists: Nja Mahdaoui, Abderrazak Sahli, Chadli Elloumi, Ridha Bettaïb, Aïcha Ibrahim).
- 1994: Organisation of monographic exhibition for the artist Dhia Azzawi, porte-folio Aboul Kacem Al Chabbi, Galerie La Kasbah, Sfax Tunisia
- 1991: Organisation of exhibition Patrimoines at Academia of Art Beit al Hikma, Carthage (Tunisia) (Khaled Ben Slimane, Nja Mahdaoui, Faouzia Hichri, Abderrazek Sahli).
