= Institute of Fine Arts (disambiguation) =

The Institute of Fine Arts usually refers to the graduate school and research center of New York University.

Institute of Fine Arts may also refer to:

- Accademia di Belle Arti di Napoli, or Institute of Fine Arts of Naples, Italy
- Institute of Fine Arts, University of Baghdad, Iraq
- Institute of Fine Arts, University of Dhaka, Bangladesh, former name of the Faculty of Fine Arts

== See also ==
- Barber Institute of Fine Arts, an art gallery and concert hall in Birmingham, England
- California Institute of the Arts (CalArts), a private art school in Santa Clarita, California, U.S.
- Hubei Institute of Fine Arts, Wuhan, China
- Sichuan Fine Arts Institute, Chongqing, China
- Tunis Institute of Fine Arts, Tunisia
