= Safia Farhat =

Tunisian academic and a women's rights activist

- Born: Safia Foudhaili; 1924; Radès, Tunisia
- Died: 7 February 2004 (aged 79–80); Radès, Tunisia
- Known for: Painting, Design, ceramics, upholstery, decorative arts, stamps, stained glass
- Movement: École de Tunis

Safia Farhat (صفية فرحات; née, Foudhaili; 1924 – 7 February 2004) was a pioneer of visual arts in Tunisia, as well as an academic and a women's rights activist. She is remembered for establishing modern tapestry in her country, as well as for her contributions in the fields of design, painting, ceramics, upholstery, and decorative arts, employing various materials such as stamps, ceramics, stained glass, and tapestry. Farhat also founded the first Arab-African feminist magazine, Faïza.

== Biography ==
Born in Radès in 1924, she was educated in France and Tunisia, including at the Tunis Institute of Fine Arts.

Farhat is remembered for establishing modern tapestry in Tunisia. She was a crucial part in creating collaborations between artists and artisans from the state-run craft industry during the period of Tunisian Socialism. Her role as the first female and first Tunisian director of the postcolonial School of Fine Arts in Tunis helped change the schools colonial, male-dominated culture to one that admitted and produced a generation of female artists and teachers.

In 1949, she participated in the artistic movement of the École de Tunis (Tunis School), the only woman associated with the group. In 1959, she founded the magazine Faiza, the first Tunisian women's magazine after the country's independence. She contributed to the reform and overhaul of teaching art, and was the first Tunisian director of the School of Fine Arts of Tunis where she taught in the late 1950s. She served as director of the Tunis Institute of Fine Arts beginning in 1966, heading its new School of Architecture.

Farhat designed Tunisian postage stamps. In 1980 they issued two - that featured Chebka Lace and metalwork, and she was responsible for one of them.

Farhat was associated with Association des peintres et amateurs de'art en Tunisie (president); Zin (co-founder, decoration company; and Centre des Arts Vivants in Rades (founder; 1981) with her husband Ammar Farhat, which they donated to the Tunisian state. Farhat created works of art in various art forms, including stained glass, drawings, paintings, reliefs, frescoes and especially decorative tapestries. She died in 2004.

== See also ==
- Code of Personal Status (Tunisia)
