= Mahmoud Tounsi =

- Born: December 13, 1944; Menzel Temime, Tunisia
- Died: April 12, 2001 (aged 56); Menzel Temime, Tunisia
- Occupations: Author, painter
- Writing career
- Notable work: Espace (1973)
- Literary movement: avant-garde

Mahmoud Tounsi (13 December 1944, in Menzel Temime – 12 April 2001, in Menzel Temime) was a Tunisian author and painter.

== Biography ==
Tounsi was born on December 13, 1944, in Menzel Temime. He attended primary school in his hometown and then high school in Tunis before studying at the Tunis Institute of Fine Arts where noted painter Abdelaziz Gorgi was professor. Working in the staff of Radio Tunis and Tunis 7, he taught fine arts at the Menzel Temime high school.

After pursuing the above careers, Tounsi became mayor of Menzel Temime. On April 12, 2001, travelling to Tunisia's Ministry of Culture to propose the creation of a theater, Tounsi was killed in a car accident aged 56.

== Work ==
Tounsi's literary work, while varied (poems, short stories, articles and studies specialized in painting) is limited. However, according to the Dictionary of Tunisian Writers, his works were important on the Tunisian cultural scene. One of his most famous pieces of writing was Espace, a collection of short stories published in 1973 and which paved the way to the avant-garde movement.

Tounsi was one of the founders of the National Council for Freedoms, which led to the creation of the Tunisian League of Human Rights. He eventually established a painting career which eclipsed his written one in terms of success.
