= Leïla Menchari =

Tunisian designer (1927–2020)

- Born: 27 September 1927; Tunis, French Tunisia
- Died: 4 April 2020 (aged 92); Paris, France
- Occupations: Designer; Decorator

Leïla Menchari (Arabic: ليلى المنشاري; 27 September 1927 – 4 April 2020) was a Tunisian designer and decorator.

== Biography ==
Menchari was born in Tunis in 1927. Her father was a lawyer and her mother, Habiba Menchari, was known for her lectures on female empowerment. As a teenager, she met Jean and Violet Henson, who introduced Menchari to horticulture and helped her meet artists such as Man Ray, Jean Cocteau, Christian Bérard, and Serge Lifar. In 1943, she entered the Tunis Institute of Fine Arts, and the École nationale supérieure des Beaux-Arts in 1948.

In Paris, Menchari met Azzedine Alaïa. She also met Guy Laroche, who helped her become a star model. However, Menchari quit Laroche's business following the death of her mother and became the decorator for Hermès International headquarters on Rue du Faubourg Saint-Honoré. She worked for Hermès as a decorator for over fifty years. She also designed gloves, bags, and clothing, including a coat worn by actress María Félix. Her other responsibilities including supervising the factoring of glass manufacturer Saint-Louis.

Leïla Menchari died on 4 April 2020 in Paris, France, due to COVID-19.

== Exposition ==
- Hermès à tire-d'aile - les mondes de Leïla Menchari (2017, Grand Palais, Paris)
