= Habiba Menchari =

Tunisian women's rights activist

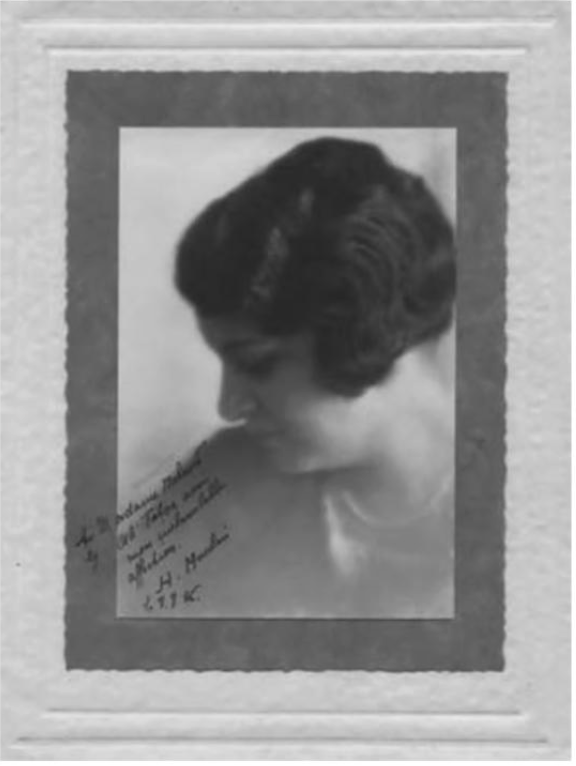
- Habiba Manchari, 1924
- Born: 1907
- Died: 1961 (aged 53–54)
- Occupations: Feminist, court clerk
- Known for: 1929 anti-veil lecture in Tunis
- Children: Leïla Menchari

Habiba Menchari (Arabic: حبيبة منشاري; 1907–1961) was a Tunisian women's rights activist. Active as early as 1924, Menchari gained fame by publicly unveiling herself during a speech against the wearing of the hijab. The speeches by Menchari, as well as compatriot Manoubia Ouertani, made at a debate called “The Muslim Woman of Tomorrow: For or Against the Veil”, are "cited as the first examples of Muslim women entering a debate dominated by men."

Menchari was a court clerk who was married to lawyer and wealthy landowner Abderrahman Menchari. She was a granddaughter of the last sultan of Touggourt. Her husband served in World War I and later advocated for pensions for Tunisian veterans.

A member of the socialist party in Tunisia, Menchari had previously led a campaign against the wearing of the veil. She was following the lead of Ouertani, who in 1924 became the first Tunisian woman to remove her hijab in public, and Egyptian Huda Sha'arawi who did so in a Cairo train station in 1923.

Menchari and other Tunisian feminists activity was opposed by otherwise ideologically aligned critics such as future first president of Tunisia Habib Bourguiba. Bourguiba argued in favor of the veil so as to not move further away from Tunisian Muslim identity at a time when there was perceived threat of the Vatican converting Tunisians to Catholicism.

She later represented Tunisia as a delegate at the 1932 Congrès des femmes méditerranéennnes (Mediterranean Women's Conference) in Tehran. Unusual for her time, Menchari became the first Tunisian woman to fly on an airplane when she travelled to France.

Her daughter, Leïla Menchari, designed Hermès scarves and the window displays for the historic Paris store.
