= Mourad Salem =

Tunisian artist based in Paris, France

Mourad SALEM
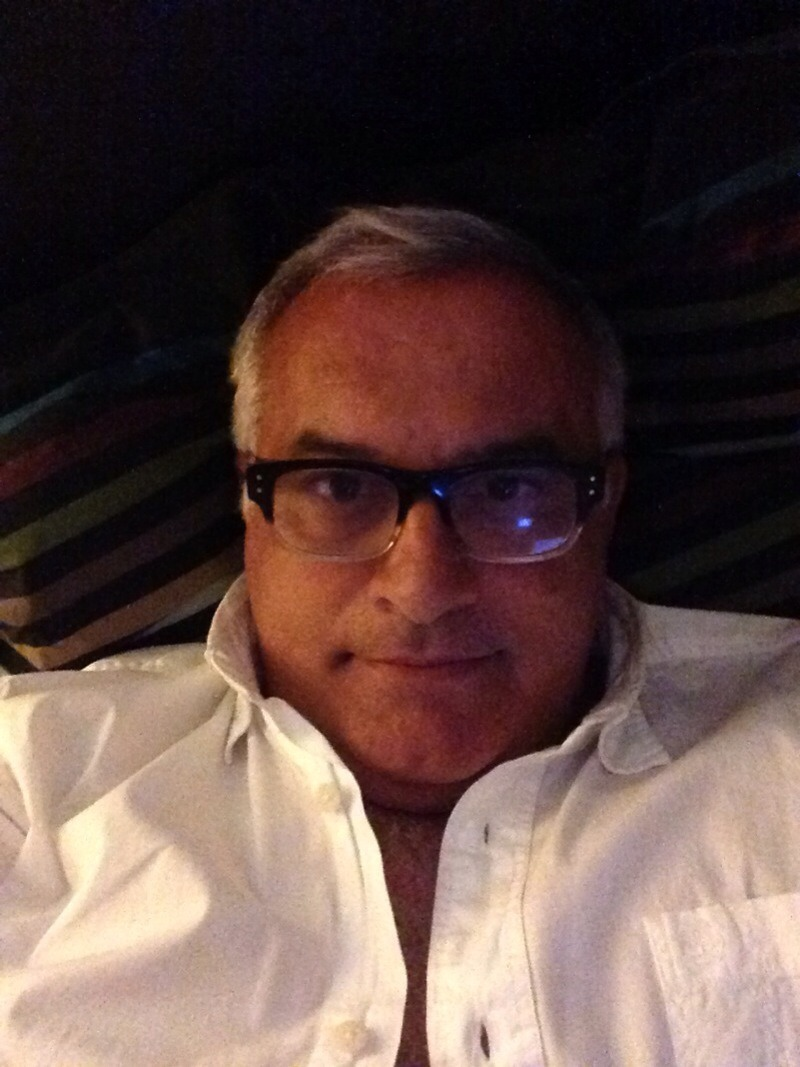
- Salem in 2014
- Born: 1956 (age 68–69)
- Notable work: Open your eyes" 2014, Rose Issa Galey, London, UK. Art Fair, Dubaï, UAE, El Marsa Gallery. "Ambivalences suspectes", Gahya gallery, Tunis, Tunisia, 2015. "Arab Territories", Constantine, Algeria, curated by Nadira Laggoune, 2015.

Mourad Salem (born 1956) is a Tunisian artist based in Paris, France. His works question historical leaders, often depicting them as immature power-hungry figures. In 2013, Salem's exhibition "Sultans Are No Sultans" debuted at the Nour Festival of Arts from the Middle East and North Africa at the Leighton House Museum in London. Salem is of Turkish origin.

== Early life and education ==
Mourad Salem was born in Tunis, Tunisia. His father was Tunisian and his mother French. He spent his youth in Tunis until he was 18. He studied in Canada and France where he lived for many years.

He graduated in Biology, Biochemistry and Pharmacy. He received a Doctorate in Pharmacy at the University of Strasbourg, France.

He then started in the eighties a career as an artist that drove him to New York and Dublin, Rep of Ireland.

Pier Kirkeby, the danish artist and the German Neo-expressionism had a major impact on him at the start of his career.

== Exhibitions ==
The last few years he exhibited in numerous venues. The most notable were:

Institut du Monde Arabe, Paris, France, 2012: " Le corps découvert". Leighton House Museum, London, UK, 2013: "Sultans are no sultans", curated by Rose Issa project.

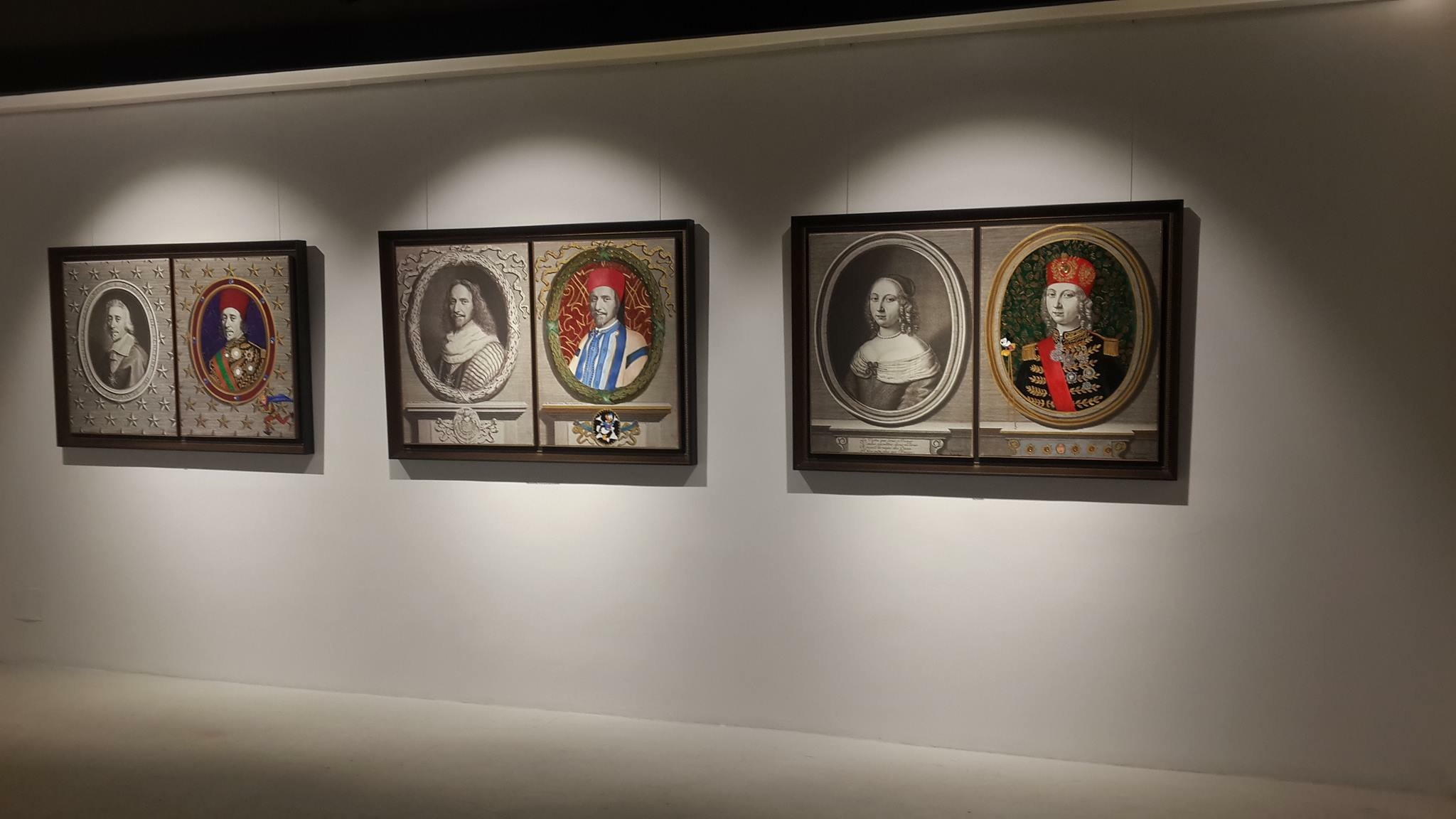

"Open your eyes" 2014, Rose Issa Galey, London, UK. Art Fair, Dubaï, UAE, El Marsa Gallery. "Ambivalences suspectes", Gahya gallery, Tunis, Tunisia, 2015. "Arab Territories", Constantine, Algeria, curated by Nadira Laggoune, 2015.
