= Zoubeir Turki =

Tunisian artist

- زبير التركي
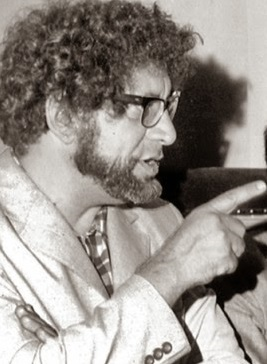
- Zoubeir Turki before 1984
- Born: April 1924; Tunis, Tunisia
- Died: 23 October 2009 (aged 85)
- Known for: Painting, Sculpture

Zoubeir Turki (19 November 1924 – 23 October 2009) was a Tunisian painter and sculptor of Turkish origin. He was the younger brother of Hedi Turki (1922–2019).

Born in the Medina of Tunis to a family of Turkish origin, Turki studied at the University of Ez-Zitouna and the Institute for Advanced Studies, while taking classes at the Tunis Institute of Fine Arts in Tunis. In 1946, he held a position in the administration before being recruited by French schools to teach Arabic. In 1952, he was forced into exile for having participated in the actions of the Tunisian nationalist movement Neo-Destour. He settled in Sweden, from 1953 to 1958, where he joined the Academy of Fine Arts in Stockholm.

He went back to Tunisia in 1958, two years after the country's independence where he resumed contact with the School of Tunis which he was a founding member of and served as senior official in the Ministry of Culture. His administrative and political associations continued to increase, he became the president of several associations and unions, including the National Union of plastic and graphic arts, the Cultural Commission of the city of Tunis, and the Union of Plastic Artists Arab Maghreb. He founded and directed the Center for Living Art and the Belvedere; furthermore, on the political front, he was elected to the National Assembly in 1979 and a municipal councilor for the city of Tunis.

Turki paintings drew their inspiration in matters of Tunisian culture and its traditions, portraying characters and scenes of everyday Tunis. Building a collective memory of Tunisia made his work a unique style which earned him international recognition. The critical Louati Ali said in a book dedicated to modern art that Turki is undoubtedly the most popular artist in the history of the artistic movement in Tunisia. Turki was also a sculptor; he made the bronze statue of Ibn Khaldun, erected on Avenue Habib Bourguiba, where the School of Tunis was founded in 1949. He also created the fresco in the lobby of the House of Tunisian radio.

On October 23, 2009, Turki died at the age of 84, After several months of hospitalization, he was buried the next day at the Djellaz Cemetery.
