= Alexandre Roubtzoff =

French painter

- Александр Рубцов
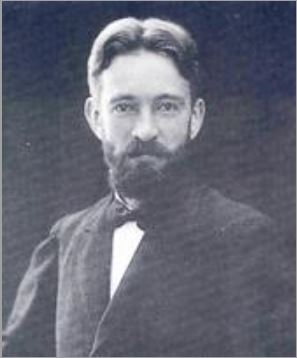
- Alexandre Roubtzoff (1920s)
- Born: 24 January 1884; St. Petersburg, Russian Empire
- Died: 26 November 1949 (aged 65); Tunis, Tunisia
- Occupation: painter

Alexandre Roubtzoff (Russian: Александр Александрович Рубцов; 24 January 1884 – 26 November 1949) was a Russian-born French painter who specialized in Orientalist scenes. Most of his adult life was spent in Tunisia.

== Biography ==
He was born in St. Petersburg. His mother, Evgenia, was unmarried. In 1897, by decree, he was allowed to take his mother's surname and a patronymic from his grandfather. He was raised by his godmother, Ekaterina, and her husband, the Polish artist Jan Ciągliński.

He began his artistic education at the drawing school where his godmother taught, then was a student of Dmitry Kardovsky and Ciągliński, at the Imperial Academy of Arts, where he was awarded a total of six grand prizes. During the 1900s, he travelled extensively with his adoptive parents, visiting Warsaw, Vienna, Venice, Munich and Paris. In 1907, he stayed in Paris for an extended period and became a regular visitor at the studio of Odilon Redon.

As the holder of a scholarship from the Academy, he travelled through Germany, France and Spain and discovered North Africa; arriving in Tangier in 1913. The following year, he went to Tunis and, after his scholarship expired, decided to settle there permanently; becoming a French citizen in 1924. He attended the Institut de Carthage and earned his living as a portrait painter for the members of French colonial society. In 1920, he held a major exhibition of over 125 works at the Tunis Salon. Many of his local models also worked for the photographer, Rudolf Franz Lehnert.

He was initially concerned with accurate portrayals of native costumes, adornments and tattoos; knowledge that he would put to use with illustrations for the works of Ernest-Gustave Gobert, a physician and ethnographer. Later, he would develop a greater interest in the character of the people themselves who, despite being poor and uneducated were, in his opinion, beautiful and noble, whereas cultured people were "ugly, petty and inelegant".

He held numerous exhibitions in France, as well as in Tunis, and some of his paintings were purchased by the government. Many of his works may still be seen at official residences. Later in his life, he would find himself in competition with the increasingly popular group of artists known as the École de Tunis, led by Pierre Boucherle.

He died of tuberculosis at the French hospital in Tunis and was interred in the Russian section of the Cimetière du Borgel. In 1984, a major retrospective was held at the Château de Bagatelle, in Paris, in connection with the 100th anniversary of his birth. In 2010, he was paid homage in Tunisia with an exhibit called "Roubtzoff et la Médina"; 48 drawings he made in 1944, as well as a few paintings. Some of his works have been used for Tunisian postage stamps.

== Selected paintings ==
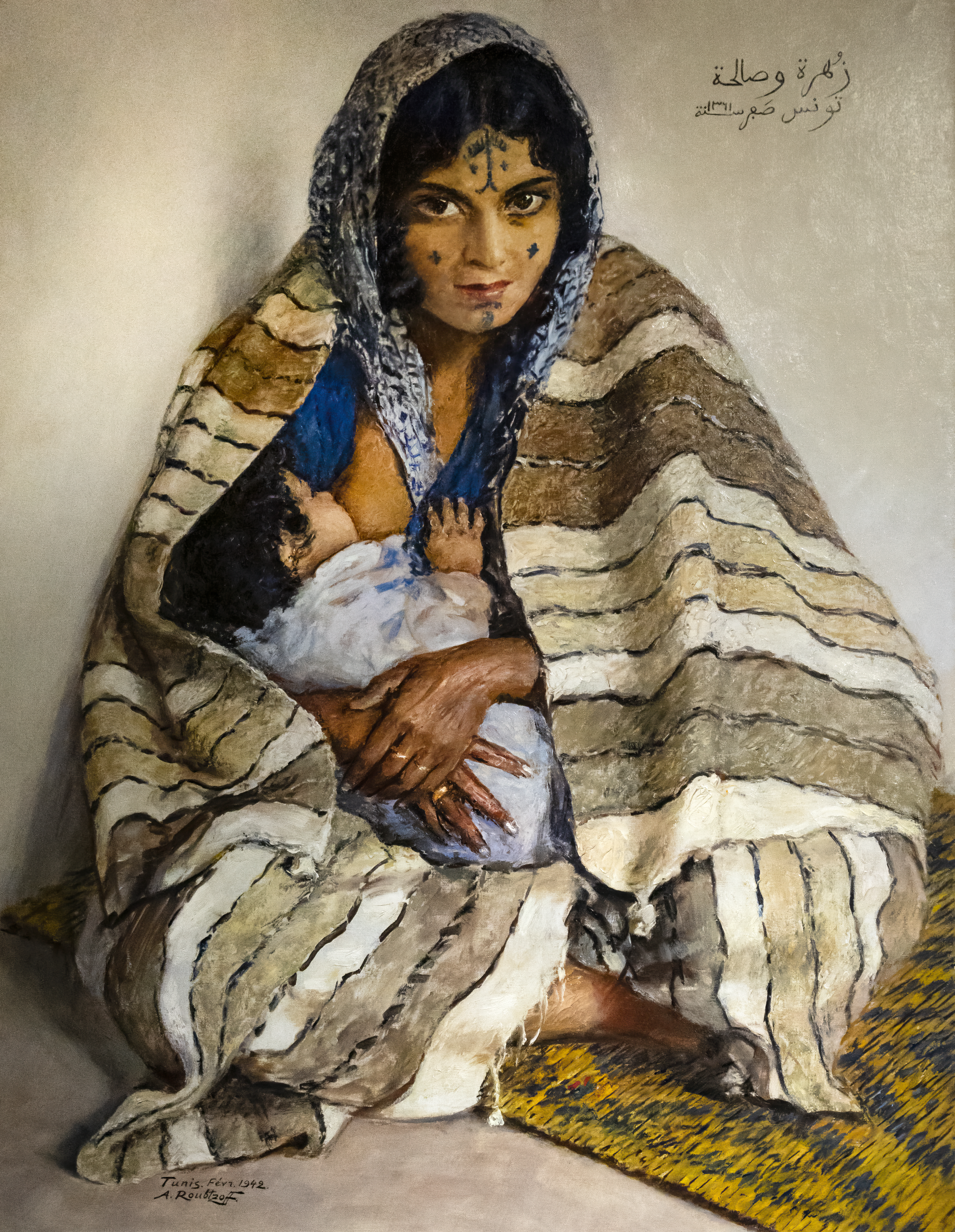
Bédouine à la couverture - Musée des Beaux-Arts de Narbonne

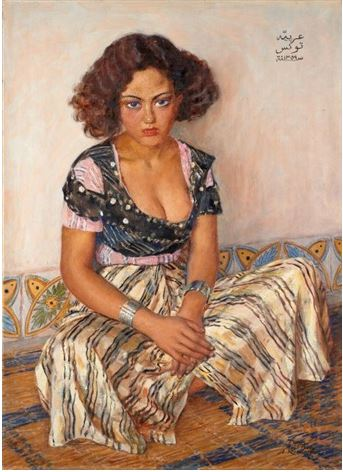
Arbia

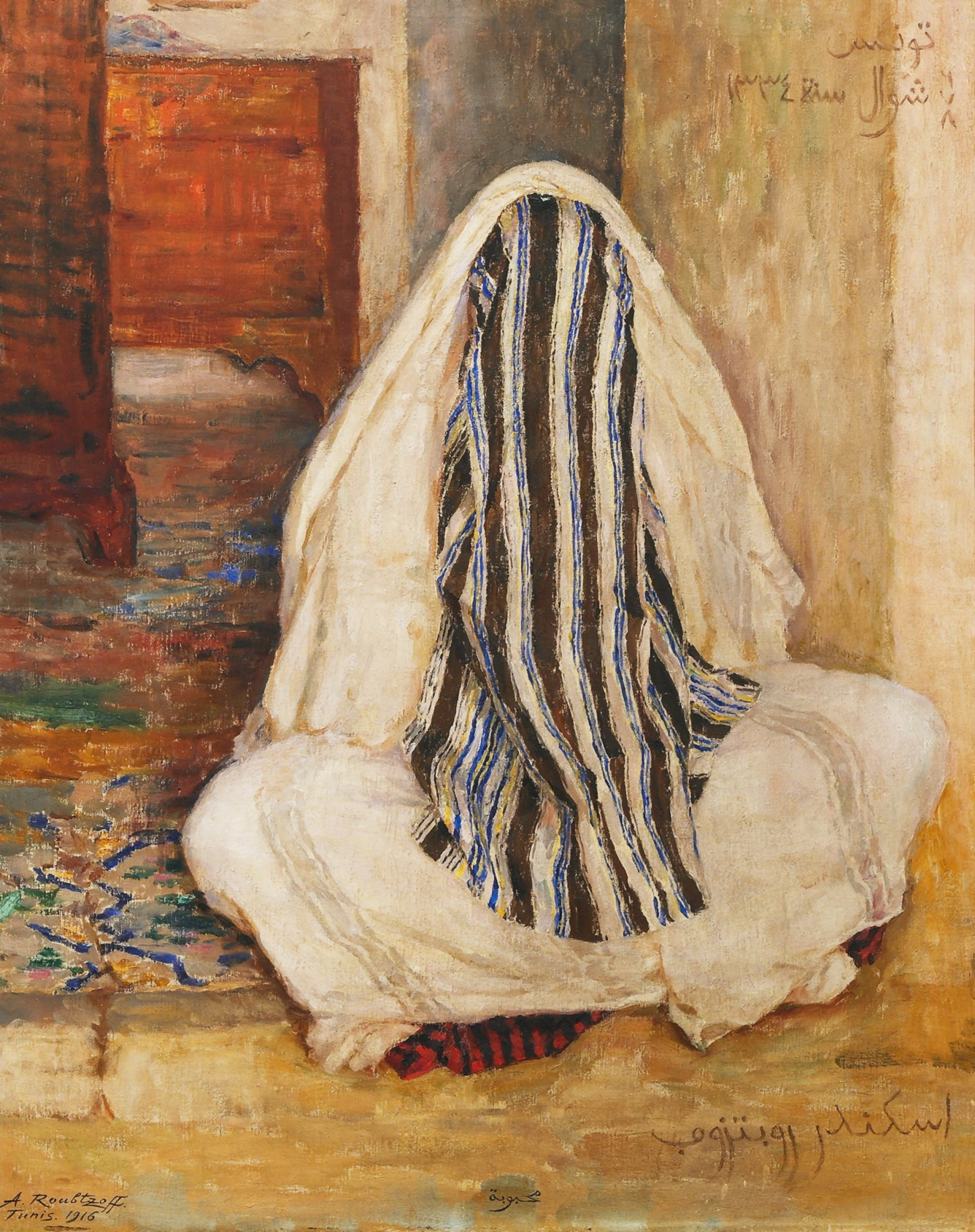
Mahbouba

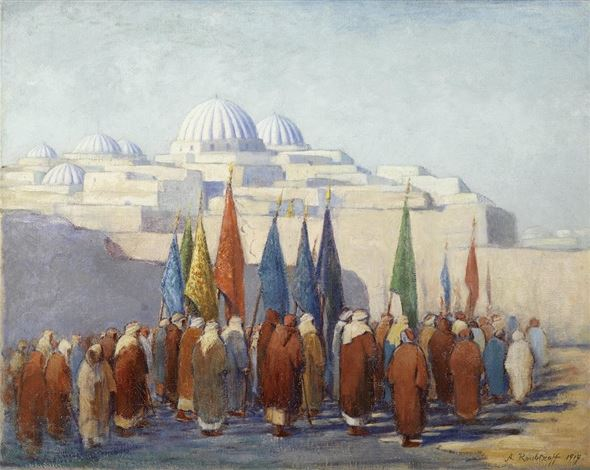
The Gathering

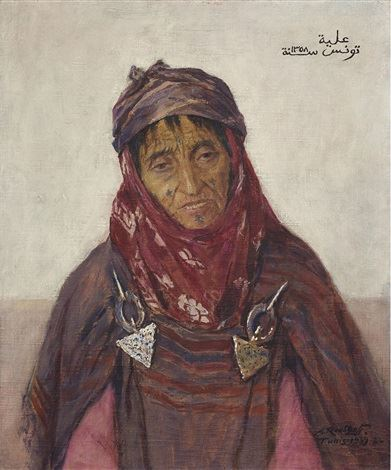
Aliya

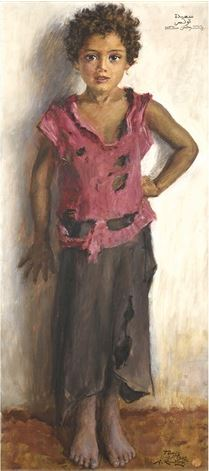
Saida
