= Tunisian collaborative painting =

Art genre in Tunisia

Tunisian Collaborative Painting is an art form developed in Tunisia in the mid-1980s. It is unique in its method of allowing a group of artists to work simultaneously on a canvas without discussion or planning beforehand. The result is a painting created by a group of individuals that looks like the work of a single artist.

Tunisian artist Hechmi Ghachem created Tunisian Collaborative Painting in 1988 when Zine el-Abidine Ben Ali became president and dictator of Tunisia. “Freely expressing yourself in Ben Ali’s Tunisia was dangerous,” said Hechmi. He set out to reclaim freedom of expression for Tunisian artists. He formed groups called Brigades d'Intervention Plastique. “The brigades enabled artists to leave their professional loneliness and work in the same space, and on the same canvas” said Hechmi. “They created ties built on pleasure, excitement, struggle, jealousy, life, and love and death, as in every creative act. Together they produced paintings which mixed the best parts of themselves with the best parts of each of the other artists. One painting represented the individuality of all.”

Hechmi Ghachem took his Brigades all over Tunisia. When a painting was finished it was given to the host who supplied the space where it was painted. Over a period of several years, hundreds of paintings were created. Many artists participated, some of them well-known and others who were new. The paintings they created together preserved the freedom of artists during the dictatorship of Zine el-Abidine Ben Ali.

== Tunisian Collaborative Painting in America ==
In November 2008, U.S. Ambassador to Tunisia, Robert Godec invited artist David Black to a reception for his paintings which were hanging in the Ambassador’s residence under the Art in Embassies Program of the U.S. Department of State. Ambassador Godec also introduced David Black to Hechmi Ghachem and the Tunisian artists who were practicing Tunisian Collaborative Painting and they invited him to participate.

Mr. Black invited the Tunisian artists to teach Tunisian Collaborative Painting in America but the Tunisian government would not let them leave the country. Hechmi Ghachem suggested that David Black introduce the new art form in America.

On February 20, 2010, David Black conducted the first session of Tunisian Collaborative Painting in America at Lyme Academy College of Fine Arts in Old Lyme, Connecticut. The students were excited by the experience and the paintings were successfully auctioned off to benefit the Academy.

Ira Goldberg, the Executive Director of The Art Students League of New York, was a spectator at Mr. Black’s workshops at Lyme Academy and he wrote a featured article entitled "All in One" in the League's Linea Journal: “Tunisian Collaborative Painting, purely by virtue of its simple set of rules, requires the elimination of desire in the creative act. Seeing what emerges without any pre-determination gives the artist incredible insight into what is possible in art. As a teaching tool, with its potential for visual expression, Tunisian Collaborative Painting has the potential to be a school unto itself.”

On November 8, 2010, at the invitation of Ira Goldberg, David Black conducted five days of workshops in Tunisian Collaborative Painting at The Art Students League of New York. One hundred and twenty-five artists from 30 countries created 26 paintings and each one of them looked like the work of a single artist. The word most used by the artists to describe their experience was “liberating.” In keeping with Tunisian tradition, the completed art works were donated to be auctioned off for the benefit of the school.

On December 17, 2010, a month after the workshops at The Art Students League, a 26-year-old Tunisian, Mohamed Bouazizi was selling fruit to feed his family. Ben Ali’s police took his fruit away and beat him. Mr. Bouazizi poured paint thinner on himself and lit a match. Word of his fiery death spread quickly and some of the Tunisian artists David Black had painted with risked their lives demonstrating in the streets. The Jasmine Revolution ended a month later on January 14, 2011 when Zine el-Abidine Ben Ali, the ruler of Tunisia for 23 years, fled the country.

In November 2011, the new government of Tunisia gave permission for the Tunisian artists to travel to America as guests of David Black. The participation of the Tunisian artists in the Tunisian Collaborative Painting workshops at The Art Students League in New York generated worldwide interest. It was covered by The Wall Street Journal, the BBC, and National Public Radio. In addition, Secretary of State, Hillary Rodham Clinton issued a statement in which she said, “David Black is an honorary diplomat. By introducing this unique art form to the United States at a time when the Tunisian artists who pioneered it could not travel, he built a bridge that artists from both countries are now able to cross.”

== Tunisian Collaborative Painting in United Kingdom ==
The painting event brought together artists from across the South of England and included Andy Council, Xenz, Paris, Richard Twose, Rob Lawes, Gina Love, Samantha Fellows, Ian Thomson and Frances Mansfield. 20 artists in total created 5 new Tunisian Collaborative Paintings. Brought together with support from The Arts Council by Luke Palmer and Karen van Hoey Smith,

During February 2019, the Royal West of England Academy hosted the UK's first Tunisian Collaborative Painting exhibition, curated by Luke Palmer. 10 new collaborative artworks were made by 36 street artists, RWA network artists and fine artists during August 2018.
