= Sidi Bou Said =

Sidi Bou Saïd سيدي بو سعيد
- Suburb / Commune
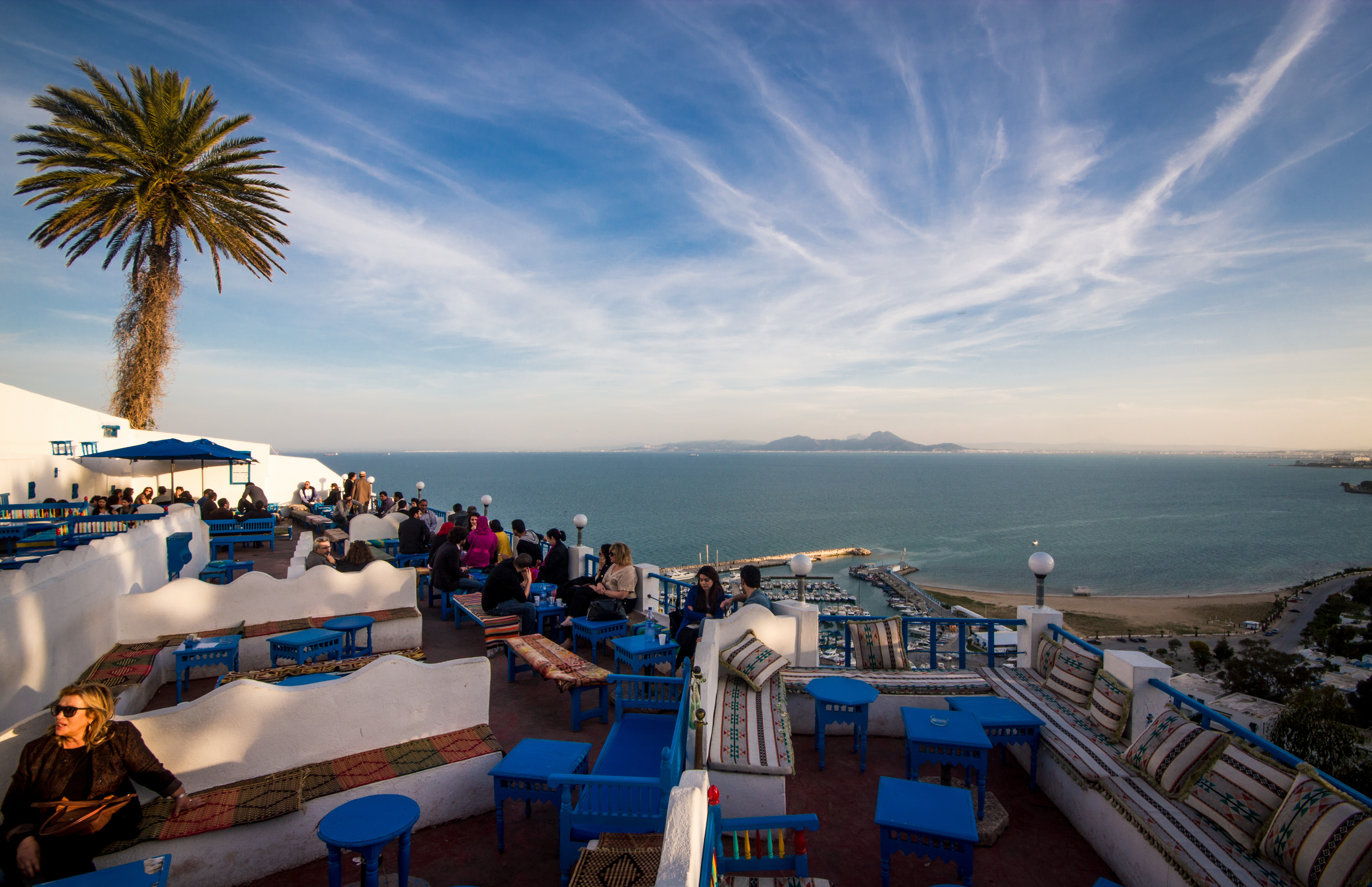
- View from Café des Délices

- Location in Tunisia
- Coordinates: 36°52′18″N 10°20′50″E
- Country: Tunisia
- Governorate: Tunis Governorate
- Delegation(s): Carthage

Government
  - Mayor: Mohamed Khalil Cherif (Nidaa Tounes)

Area (municipality)
  - Total: 2.213 km^{2} (0.854 sq mi)

Population (2024)
  - Total: 4,988
  - Density: 2,254/km^{2} (5,840/sq mi)
- Decline of -3.4% annually from 2014 (7,206) to 2024.
- Time zone: UTC+1 (CET)
- Postal code: 2026

UNESCO World Heritage Site
- Official name: Village of Sidi Bou Saïd
- Criteria: Cultural: iii
- Reference: 1769
- Inscription: 2026 (48th Session)
- Area: 76.54 ha (189.1 acres)
- Buffer zone: 84.44 ha (208.7 acres)

Sidi Bou Saïd (سيدي بو سعيد Sīdi Bū Sʻīd) is a town in northern Tunisia, located about 20 km northeast of the capital, Tunis.

Named after the religious figure Abu Said al-Baji, it was formerly known as Jbel el-Menar. The town is a popular tourist destination, celebrated for its distinctive blue-and-white architecture. It is accessible via the TGM train line, which runs from Tunis to La Marsa.

The village was designated by UNESCO as a World Heritage Site in 2026 under the title "Village of Sidi Bou Saïd", recognizing its architectural harmony, spiritual heritage, and Mediterranean coastal character.

== History ==
Abu Said Ibn Khalaf Yahya al-Tamimi al-Beji arrived in the village of Jabal el-Menar and established a sanctuary there in the 12th or 13th century AD. After his death in 1231, he was buried at the site. In the 18th century, wealthy citizens of the Beylik of Tunis built residences in Sidi Bou Said.

During the 1920s, Rodolphe d'Erlanger popularized the town’s blue-and-white color scheme. His former residence, Ennejma Ezzahra, is now a museum featuring musical instruments and hosting concerts of classical and Arabic music.

== Recent challenges ==
In January 2026, Sidi Bou Saïd experienced its heaviest rainfall in over 70 years (nearly 300 mm in 48 hours in some reports), triggering landslides and cracks on the fragile hillside. Authorities evacuated several properties, restricted heavy vehicles, and initiated stabilization efforts, with President Kais Saied visiting affected areas to assess damage and emphasize long-term preservation. Experts attribute the increased risk to the town's precarious geology combined with urban pressures and climate change.

== Notable people ==
Sidi Bou Said has long attracted artists and intellectuals. Notable residents or visitors include the occultist Aleister Crowley and painters Paul Klee, Gustave-Henri Jossot, August Macke, and Louis Moillet. Tunisian artists associated with the École de Tunis, such as Yahia Turki, Brahim Dhahak, and Ammar Farhat, have also been linked to the town.

French philosopher Michel Foucault lived in Sidi Bou Said while teaching at Tunis University, and author André Gide owned a house in the town.

Former Tunisian President Beji Caid Essebsi was born in Sidi Bou Said, as was film director Moufida Tlatli. Fashion designer Azzedine Alaïa maintained a residence in the town, which is now an art gallery.

French singer Patrick Bruel referenced Sidi Bou Said and the Café des Délices in his song Au Café des Délices from the 1999 album Juste Avant.

== Attractions and tourism ==
Sidi Bou Saïd remains one of Tunisia's most visited destinations, drawing crowds for its photogenic blue-and-white streets, bougainvillea-covered walls, and panoramic views over the Gulf of Tunis and Mediterranean Sea.

Key attractions include:

- Café des Nattes (Place des Nattes), a historic café famous for mint tea served with pine nuts.
- Café des Délices, perched on the cliffside with sweeping sea views.
- Dar Ennejma Ezzahra (Palace of Baron d'Erlanger), a museum and concert venue showcasing Arab and Mediterranean music, with a collection of historic instruments.
- Dar El Annabi, a preserved traditional Tunisian house museum illustrating local domestic life and architecture.
- Numerous art galleries (such as Galerie A. Gorgi) featuring contemporary Tunisian works, artisan shops selling crafts, and nearby access to Carthage archaeological sites.

The town is easily reached by TGM train and complements day trips from Tunis, with tourism contributing significantly to the local economy despite occasional environmental pressures.

== Gallery ==
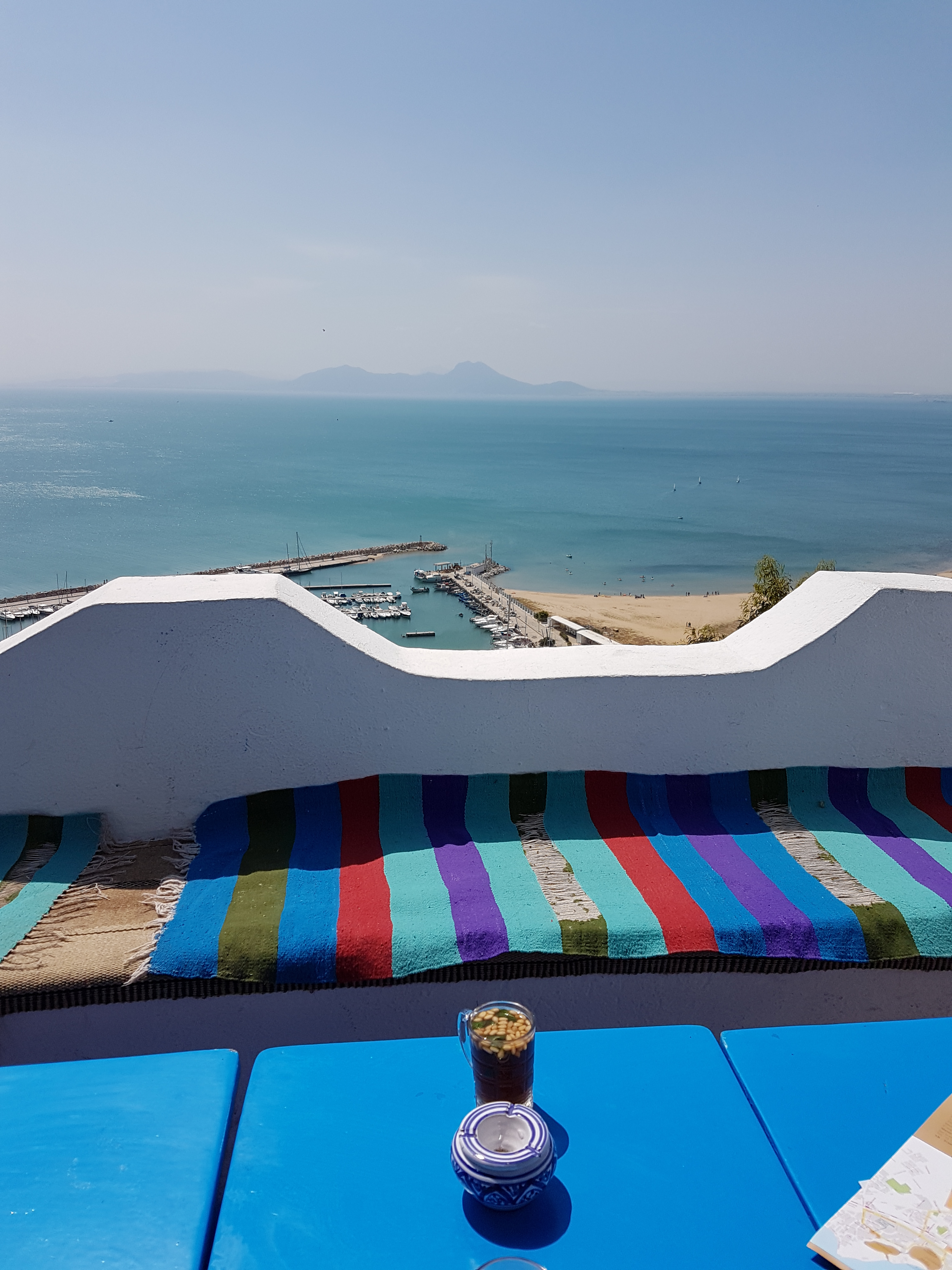
Cafe de delice and coast view

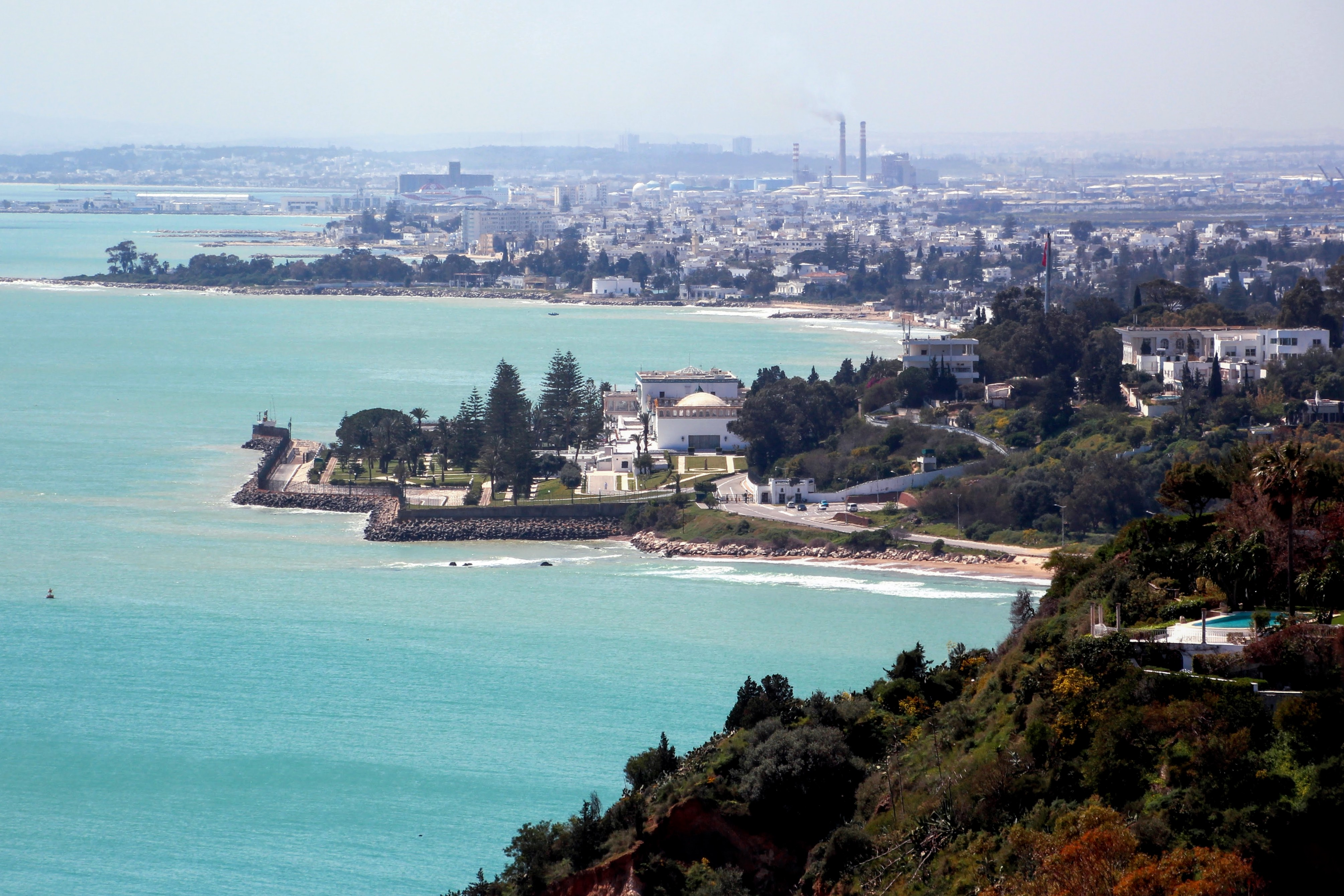
Carthage Palace from Sidi Bou Said

Typical street with white walls and blue window shades

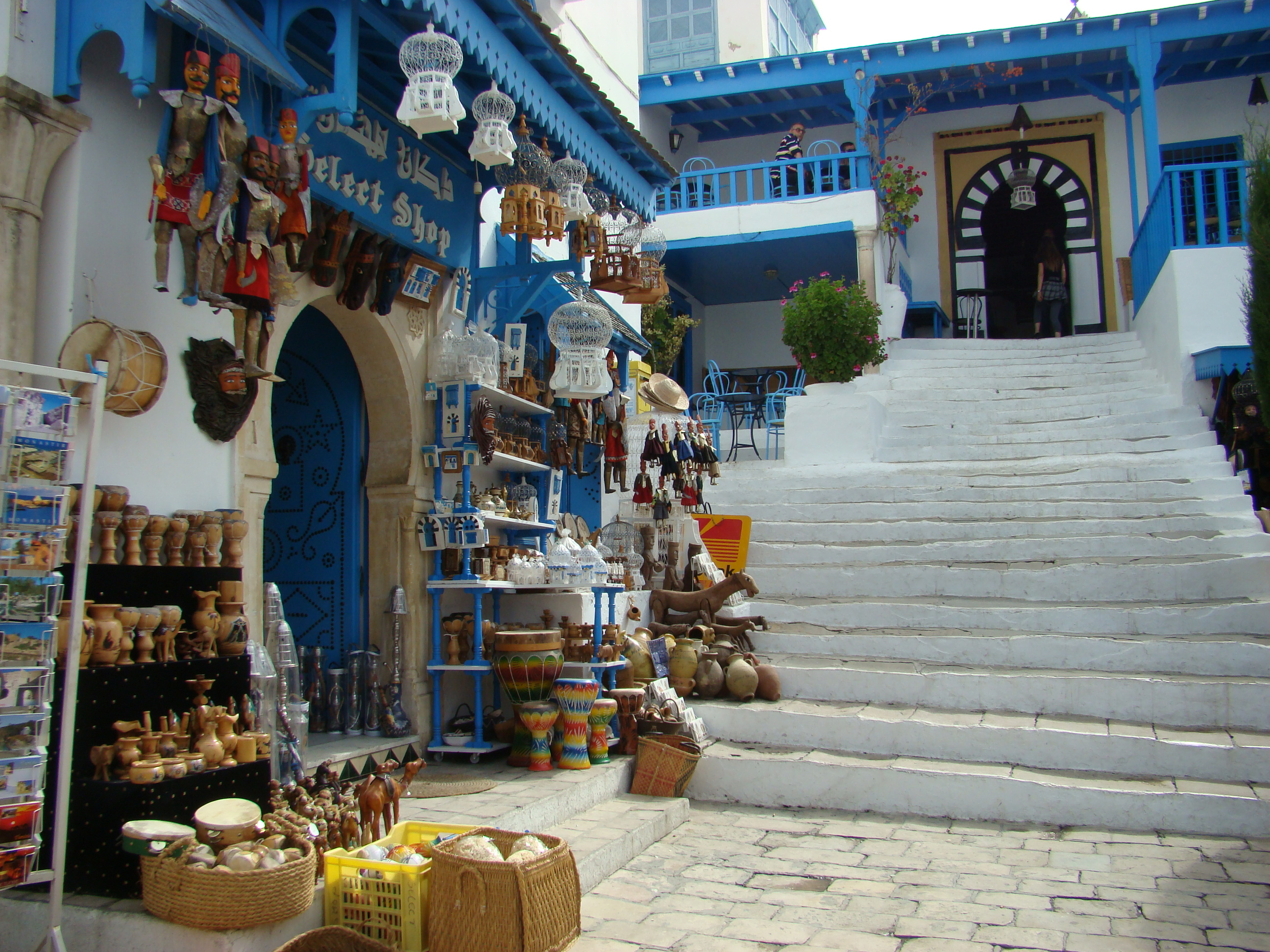
Café de Nattes and souvenir shops

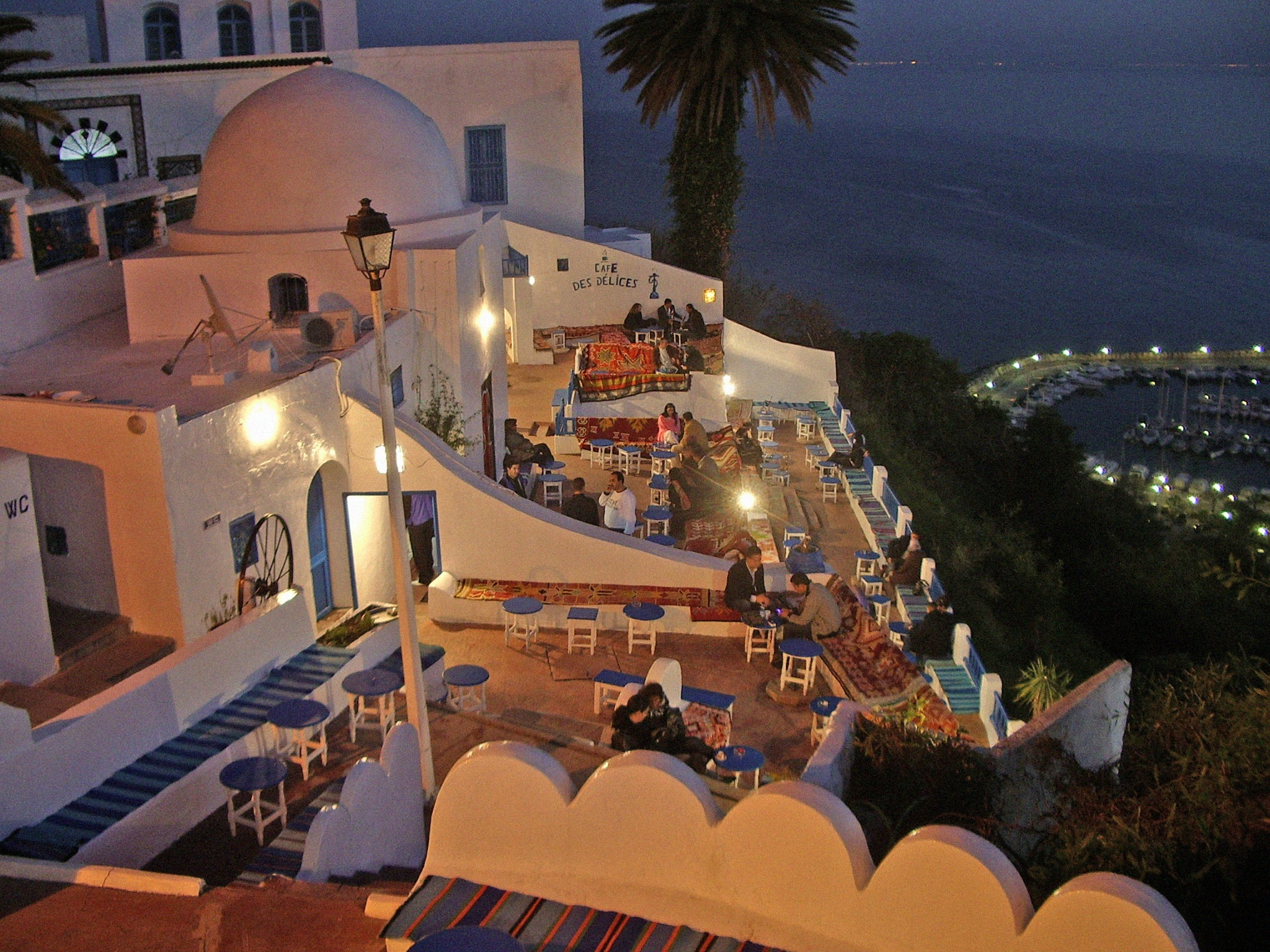
Café des Délices at night

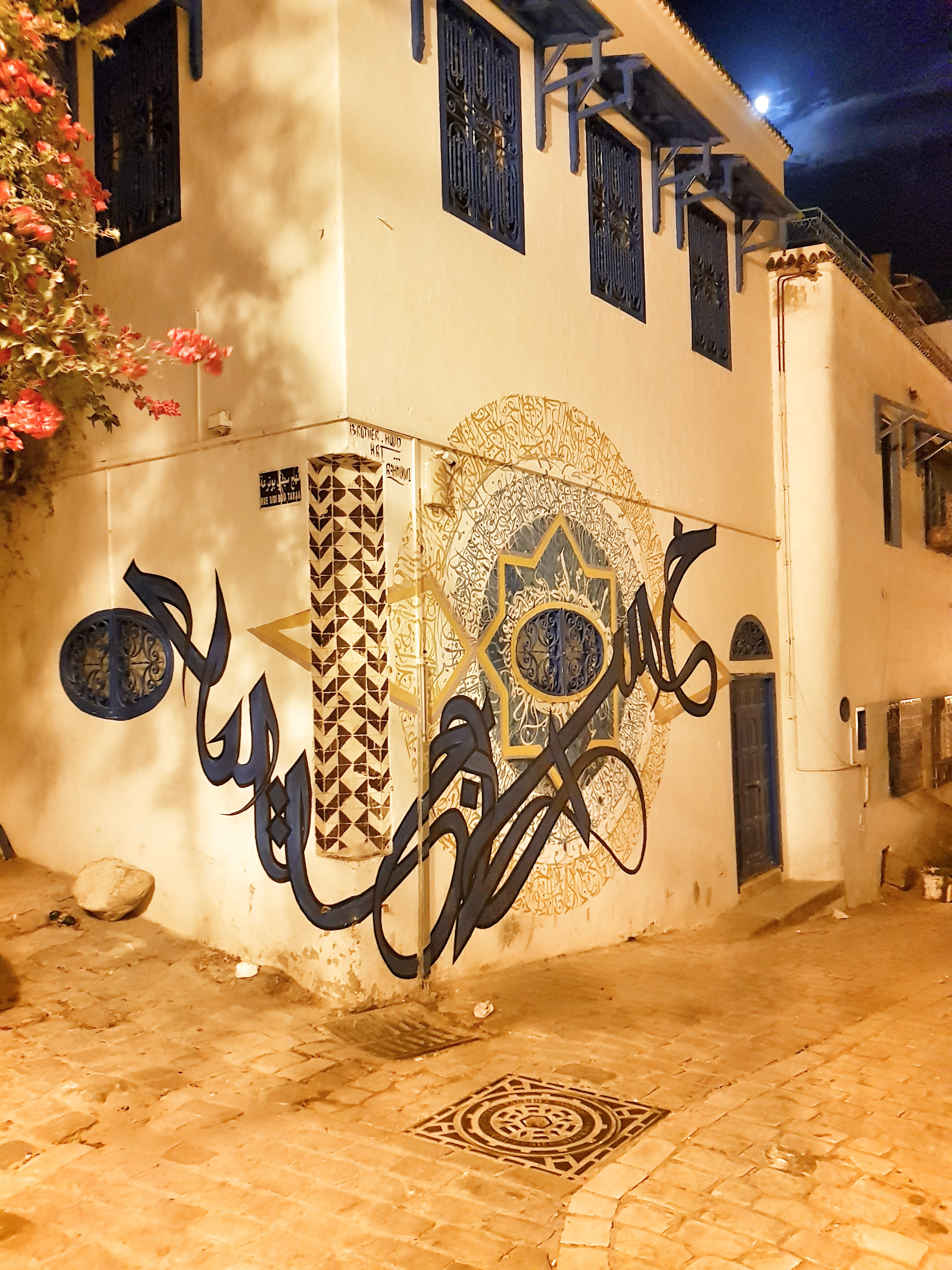
Graffiti in Sidi Bou Said

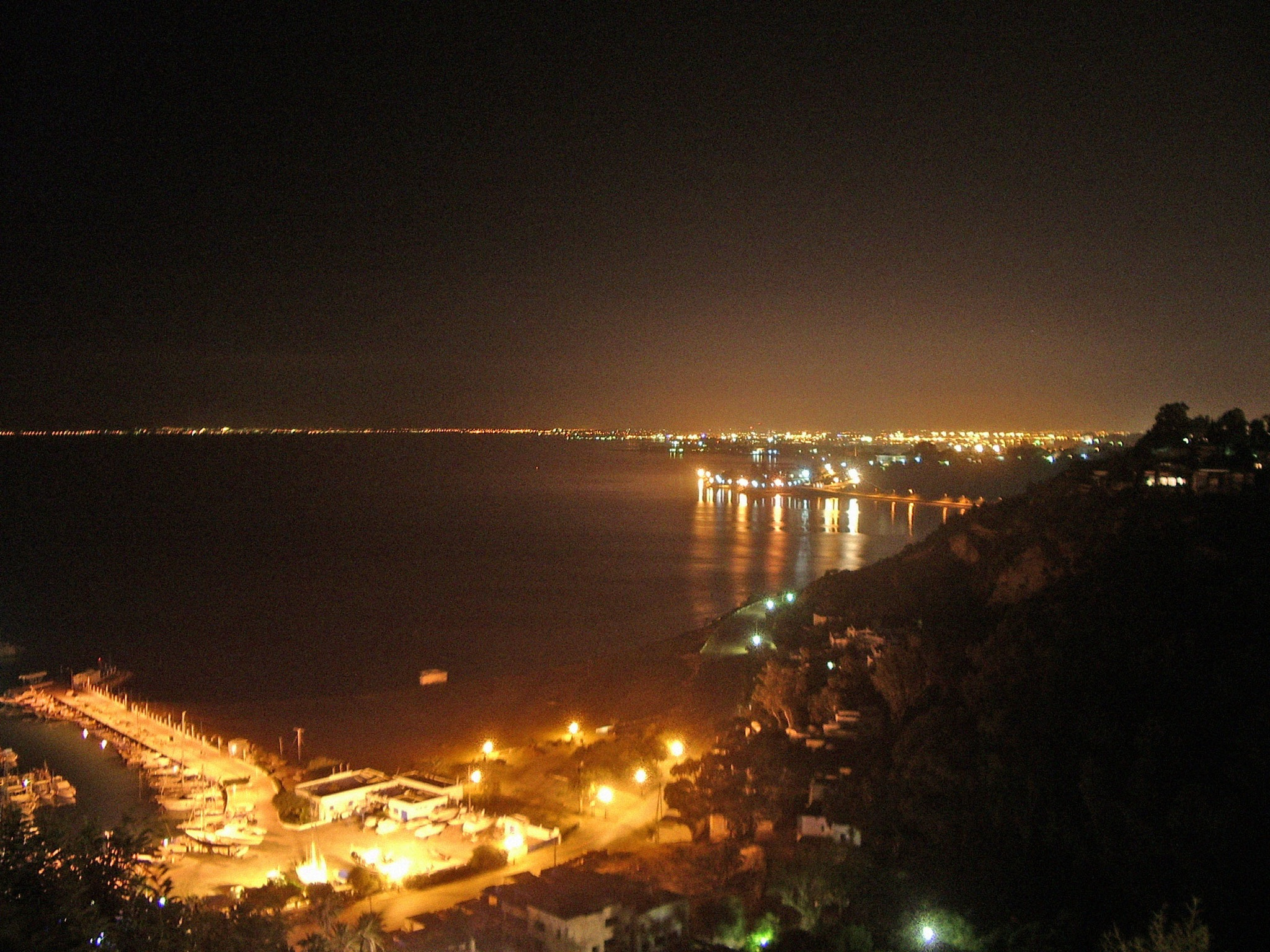
Gulf of Tunis by night

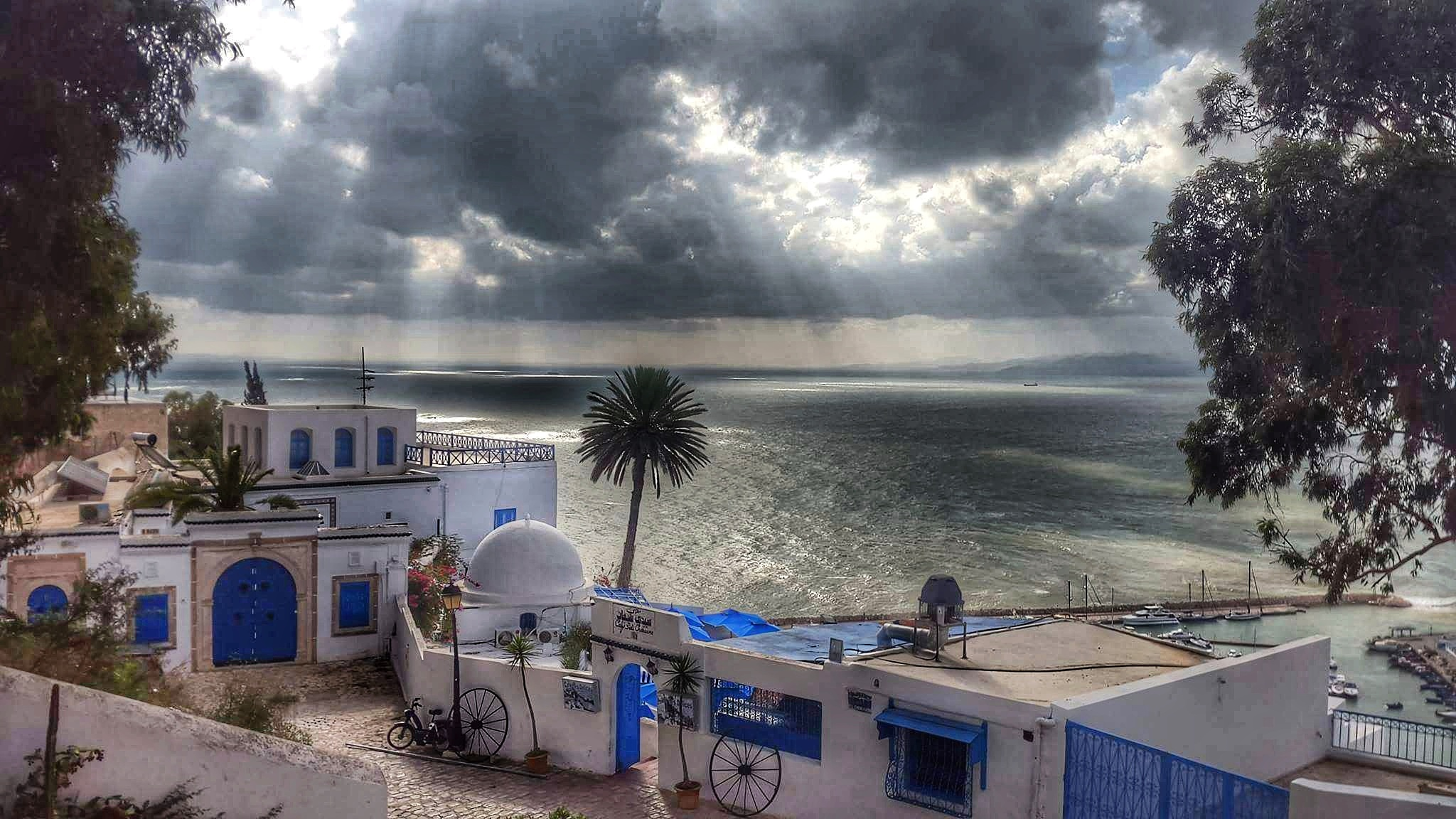
Sidi Bou Said in cloudy weather

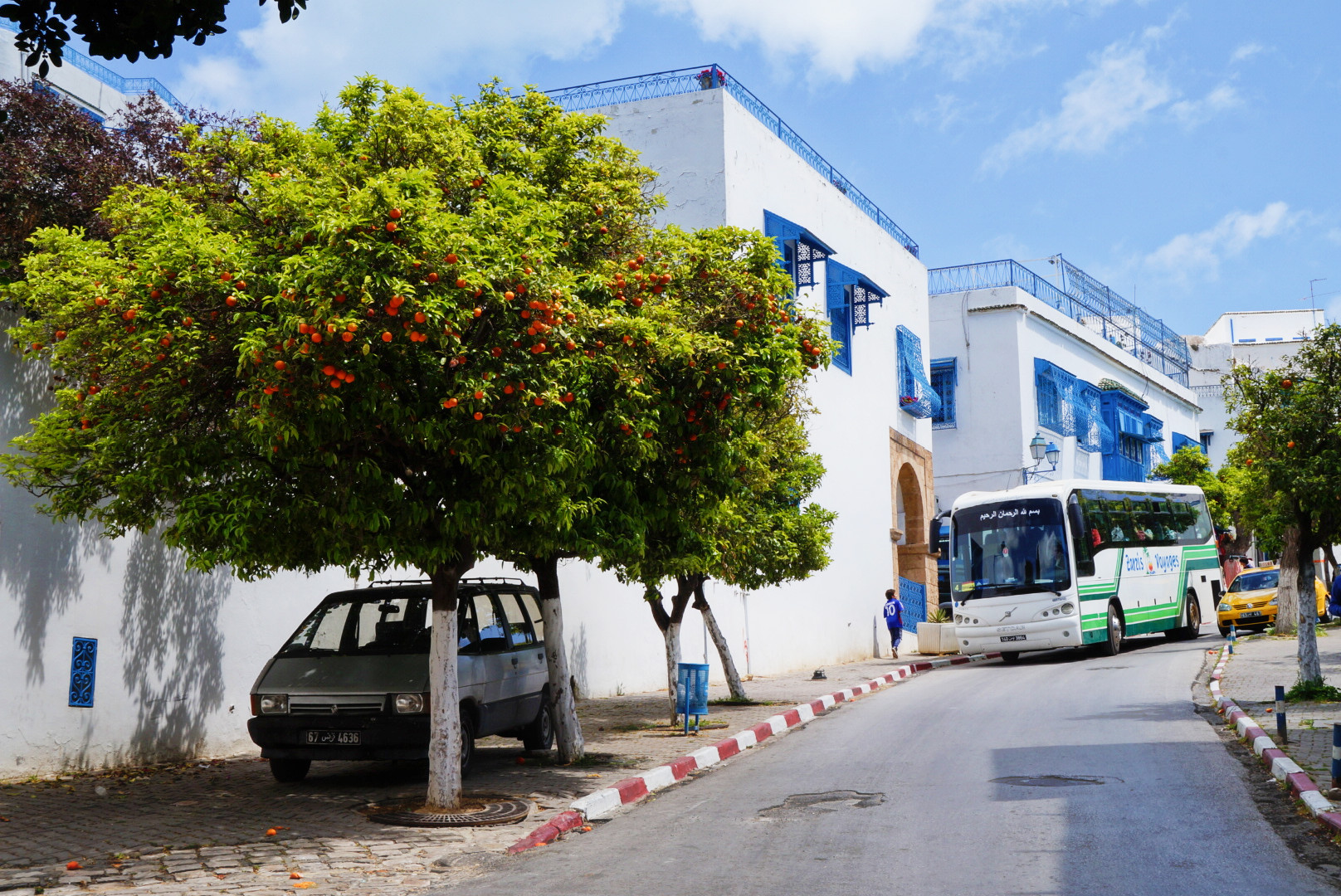
Sidi Bou Said road

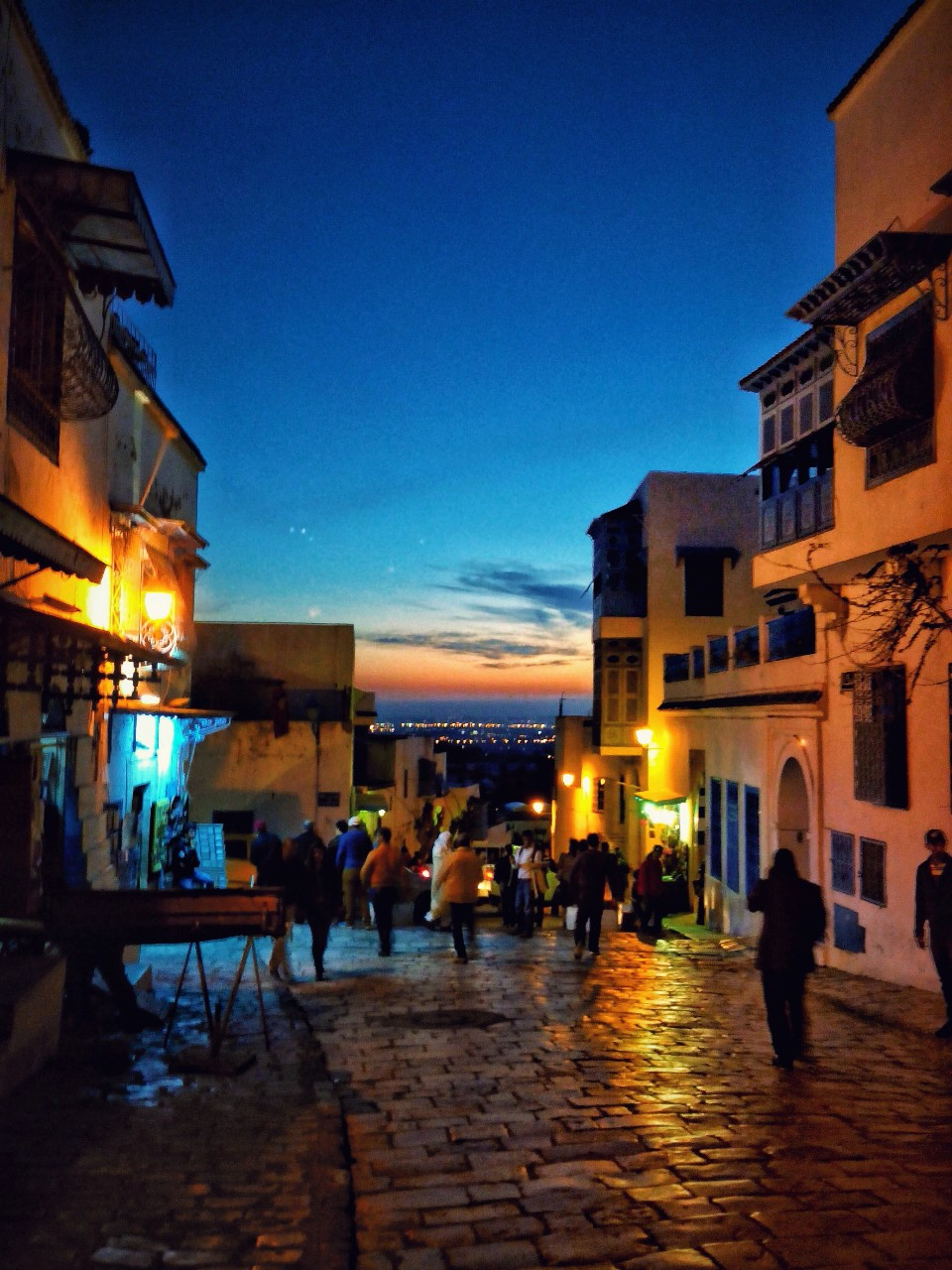
Sidi Bou Said at night

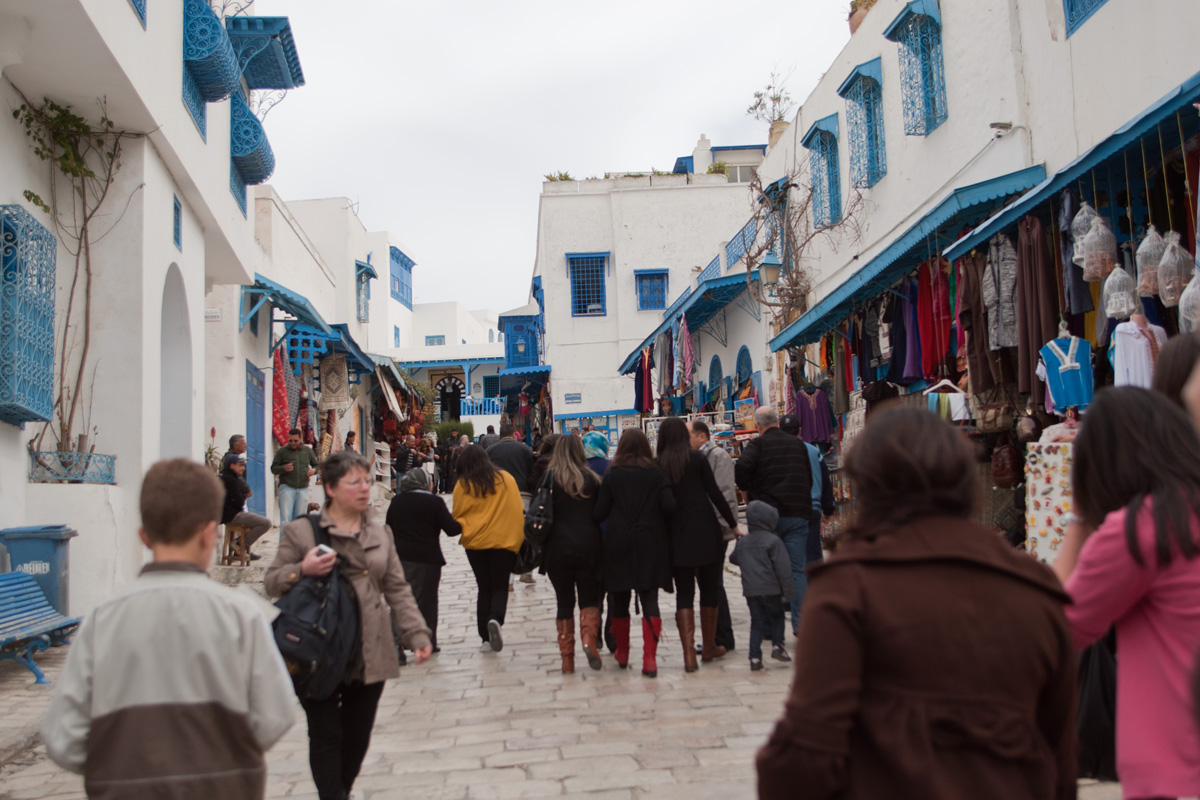
People and tourists in Sidi Bou Said

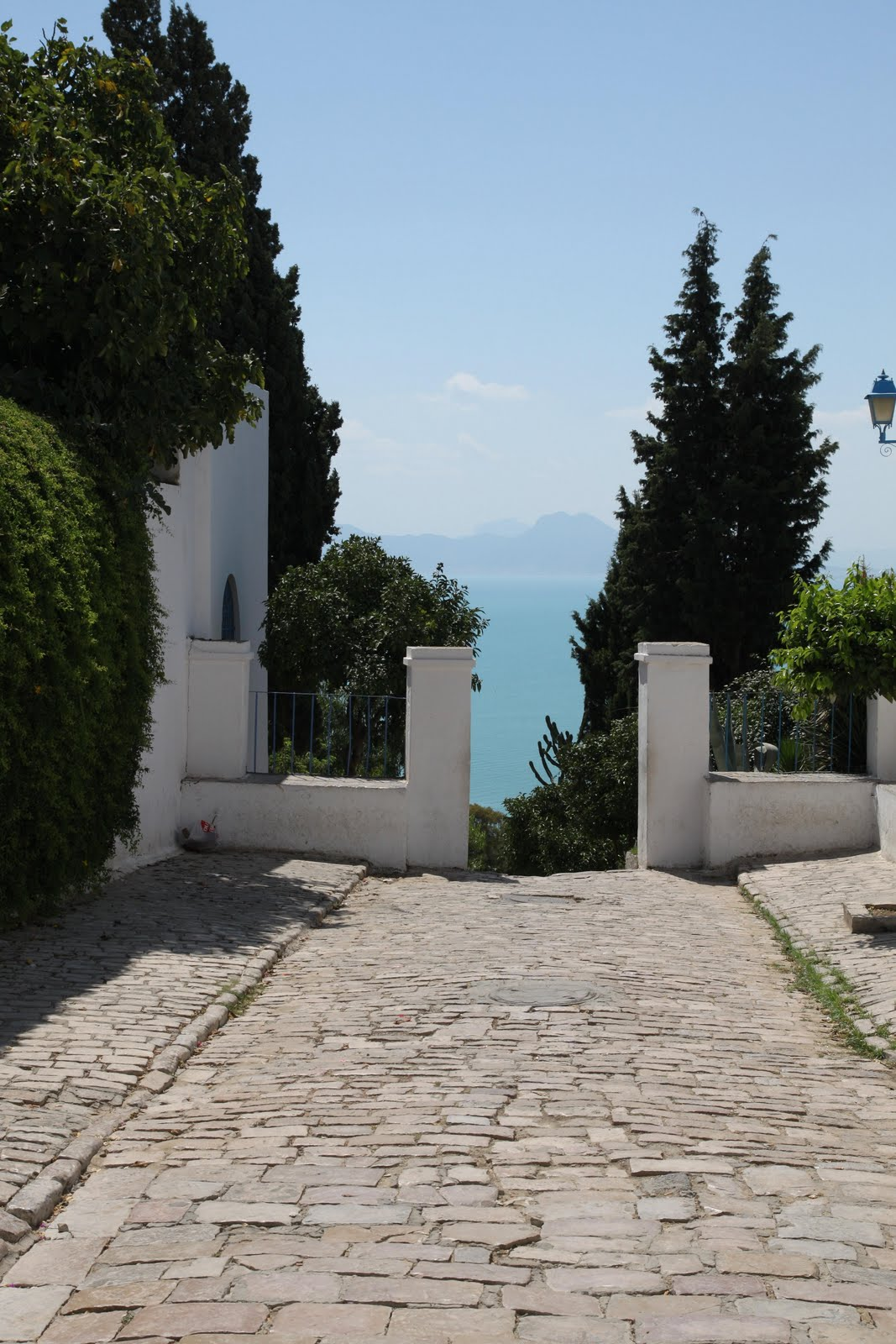
Sea and mountain view from Sidi Bou Said

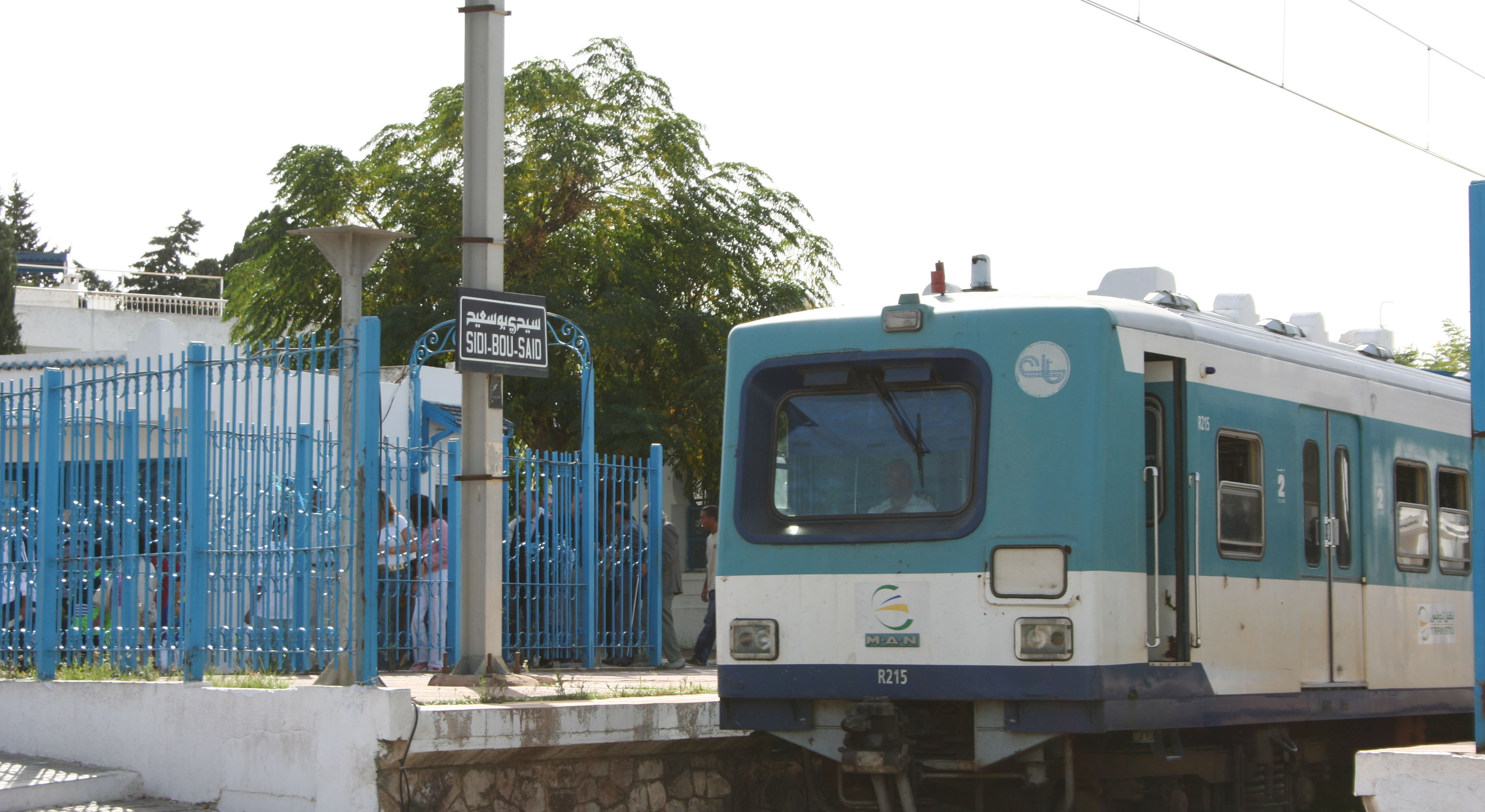
TGM in Sidi Bou Said

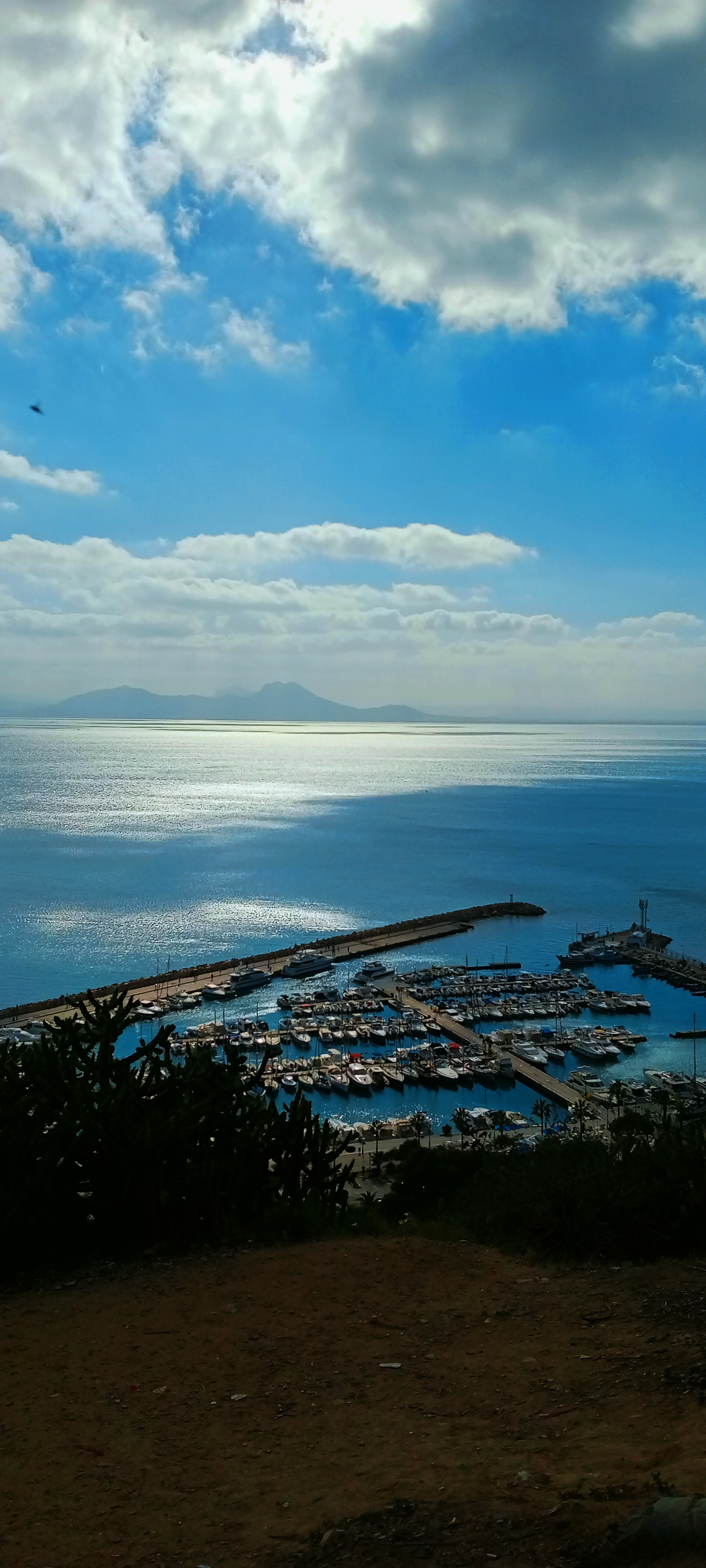
