= Meriem Bouderbala =

Tunisian plastic artist (born 1960)

Meriem Bouderbala (Arabic: مريم بودربالة; born 1960) is a Tunisian plastic artist who lives and works between Tunis and Paris.

== Early life and education ==
Meriem Bouderbala was born in Tunis in 1960. She left Tunisia to enroll at the École supérieure d'art d'Aix-en-Provence in 1980, graduating with a degree in engraving and painting in 1985. Then, in 1986, she studied in the engraving department of the Chelsea College of Arts in London. She has subsequently lived and worked between Tunis and Paris.

== Artistic work ==
Bouderbala uses different creative methods to produce her work. She paints on various surfaces (canvas, paper, glass, and fabric), enriching her paints with materials like iron filings or sands, and she also works in ceramics, photography, and collage. As her career progressed, she was increasingly drawn to photographic self-portrait.

Her work turns a critical eye toward Orientalism, and it also addresses the condition of women in the Arab world. With her series Flag Nymphéas and Awakened, she expressed her disillusionment with the Tunisian revolution.

In her words:

My dual origins and my dual French-Tunisian culture have always influenced my work as a plastic artist. Both of them have inspired the gestures, the adjustments, the decisions that have led my works toward a "minority becoming."

She has also worked as a scenic designer and stage director for such works of theater as Ubu en Palestine, which was staged in Ramallah in 2002.

In 2015, she was named an officer of the French Ordre des Arts et des Lettres.

== Exhibitions ==
Bouderbala has participated in more than 20 exhibitions, both across the Arab world and in France, including four solo shows in the 1980s and '90s.

In 2012, she served as curator of the Printemps des Arts fair in Tunis, which was attacked by religious extremists. The controversy that prompted the attack included one of Bouderbala's pieces, which a nearly nude woman with bearded men in the background. She and other artists spoke out when government officials defended the attackers, with Bouderbala saying, "We don't have to justify our art."

=== Solo exhibitions ===
- 1986: Galerie Lola Gassin, Nice, France
- 1988: Galerie Lola Gassin, Nice, France
- 1989: Galerie Lola Gassin, Nice, France
- 1993: Galerie Lola Gassin, Nice, France

=== Group exhibitions ===
- 1994: Autour de la Méditerranée - Vivien Isnard, Patrick Lanneau, Serge Plagnol, Meriem Bouderbala, Galerie Lola Gassin, Cannes, France
- 2013: Halim Al Karim, Meriem Bouderbala, Lucien Clergue et Françoise Huguier, Galerie Patrice Trigano, Paris, France
- 2016: Yesterday is Tomorrow's Memory, Galerie El Marsa, Dubai, United Arab Emirates
- 2017: E-Mois, Museum of African Contemporary Art Al Maaden, Marrakesh, Morocco
- 2017: E-Mois - Autobiography of a Collection, Fondation Alliances, Casablanca, Morocco
- 2018: Un œil ouvert sur le monde, Institut du Monde Arabe, Paris, France

=== Biennials ===
- 2008: Mediterranean Art Biennial, Tunis, Tunisia
- 2010: Cairo International Biennale, Giza, Egypt
- 2014: Dakar Biennale, Dakar, Senegal

=== Art fairs ===
- 2013: Art Dubai, Dubai, United Arab Emirates
- 2015: Art Paris, Paris, France
- 2019: Art Paris, Paris, France
