= Mahmoud Sehili =

- Born: July 27, 1931; Tunis
- Died: October 10, 2015 (aged 84)
- Occupation: Painter

Mahmoud Sehili (27 July 1931 – 10 October 2015) was a Tunisian painter.

== Biography ==
Sehili was born in Tunis; his father was a fisherman and his mother an embroiderer. He developed a passion for music and learned the oud. After studying at the Tunis Institute of Fine Arts from 1949 to 1952, he completed his training at the École nationale supérieure des Beaux-Arts from 1953 to 1960. His professor was Raymond Legueult.

On his return to Tunisia, he hosted a workshop and provided courses at the School of Fine Arts of Tunis from 1960 to 1980.
