= Ali Zenaïdi =

Tunisian painter (born 1950)

Ali Zenaidi
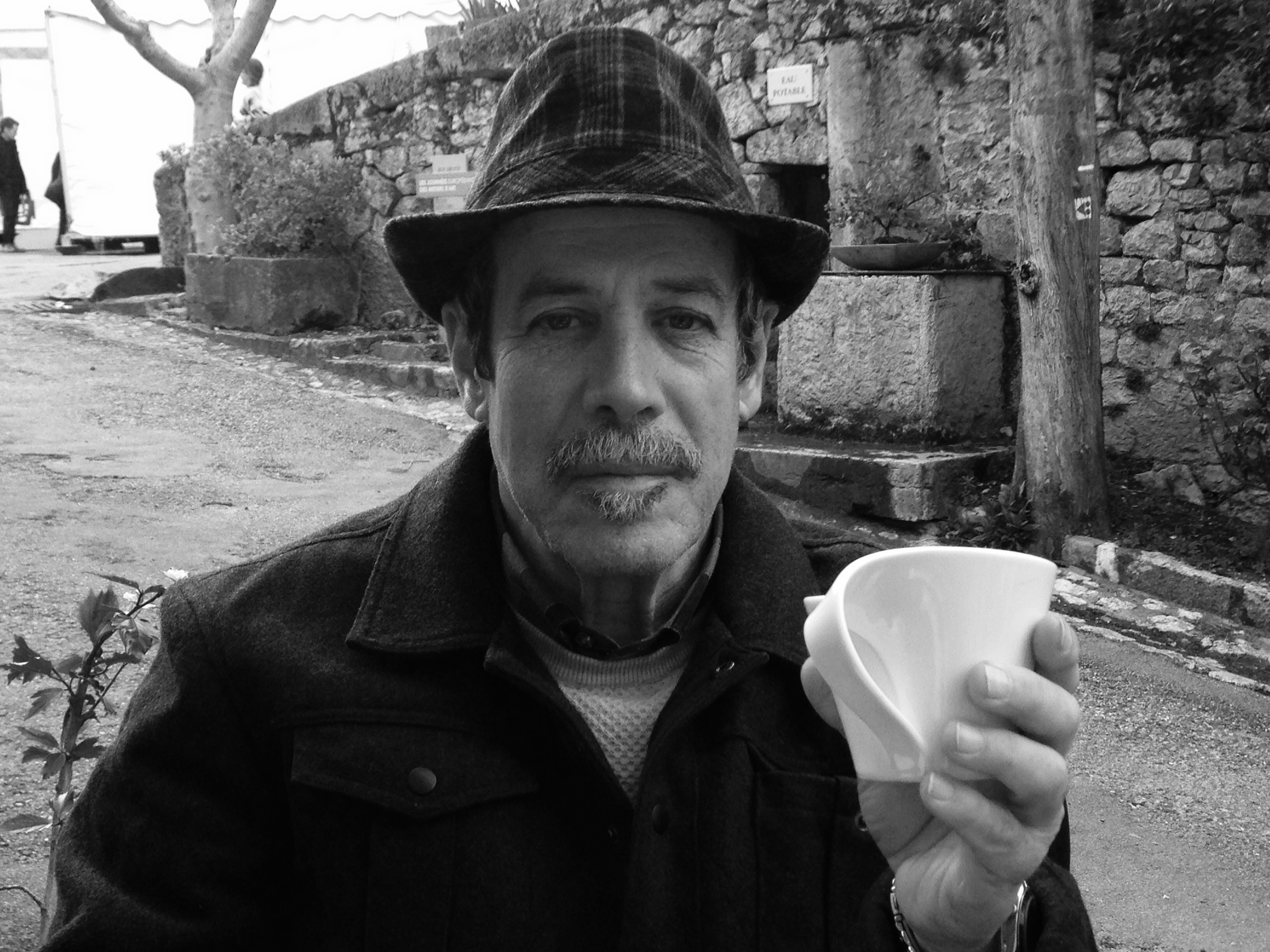
- Born: 1950 (age 75–76); Tunis
- Education: Tunis Institute of Fine Arts

Ali Zenaidi is a Tunisian painter. He was born in 1950 in the Medina of Tunis. He studied from 1970 to 1975 at the Tunis Institute of Fine Arts from where he graduated. Thereafter, he started teaching Plastic Arts. He has participated in several exhibitions in Tunisia and abroad (Europe, Middle East, USA, Indonesia).

He won the first prize of contemporary art in San Vito (Italy) in 1991, the prize of the contemporary art of the jury in Abu Dhabi in 1995 and the first Grand jury's prize of the city of Tunis in 2010. Also in 2010 he received the Decoration of Cultural Merit of the Tunisian Republic.

In 2015, he made a major exhibition showing 40 years of creation (1975 to 2015) at the Tunis City Museum (Palais Kheireddine). An art book was realised for the event.

His works are in the collections of the Tunisian state, in those of several embassies (Paris, Buenos Aires, Islamabad) and in several private collections.
