= Khaled Ben Slimane =

Tunisian artist

- Born: 1951; Sousse, Tunisia
- Education: Institut Technologique d'Art, d'Architecture et d'Urbanisme, Tunis (1977); Escuela Massana de Barcelona
- Known for: Ceramics; Painting

Khaled Ben Slimane (born 1951 in Sousse) is a Tunisian artist mostly known for his ceramic work. He lives and works in Tunisia.

== Biography ==
Khaled Ben Slimane graduated in ceramics at the Institut Technologique d'Art, d'Architecture et d'Urbanisme in Tunis in 1977, and then studied at the Escuela Massana de Barcelona before returning to Tunisia in 1979.

Khaled Ben Slimane traveled in India, Iran and Pakistan between 1975 and 1976, and lived in Tokyo from 1982 to 1983, where he collaborated with Japanese ceramists.

== Work ==
In his work, Khaled Ben Slimane mixes Islamic art with a form of Westernized beauty.

== Awards ==
- 1990: Elected member of the International Academy of Ceramics in Geneva.

== Bibliography ==
- Porter, Venetia (2006). Word into Art - Artists of the Modern Middle East. The British Museum Press. ISBN 978-0-7141-1163-6.
