= Hichem Driss =

Tunisian photographer

- Born: 1968; Tunis, Tunisia
- Education: École de communication visuelle in Paris, France (graduation 2003)
- Known for: Photography
- Notable work: #404

Hichem Driss (born 1968, in Tunis) is a Tunisian photographer, educated at the École de communication visuelle in Paris. A freelance photographer since 2002, he has often cooperated with other photographers within fashion, design, architecture and art photography. In his series #404, Driss deals with the sudden freedom from censorship in the wake of the Jasmine Revolution in 2011.

== Exhibitions ==
- Degagements—Tunisia One Year On, Paris (2012)
- Nazar: Photographs from the Arab World, Noorderlicht (2004)
- Lettres d'Argiles, Institut Francais de Coopération Tunis (2000)
- Rencontres Africaines de la Photographie, Musée National du Mali, Bamako (1998)
- Les Fiestas du Sud, Marseille (1998)
- Havana Biennial, Cuba (1997)
