= Tazerka =

Commune and town in Tunisia

Coordinates: 36°33′N 10°50′E

Tazarka
- Commune and town
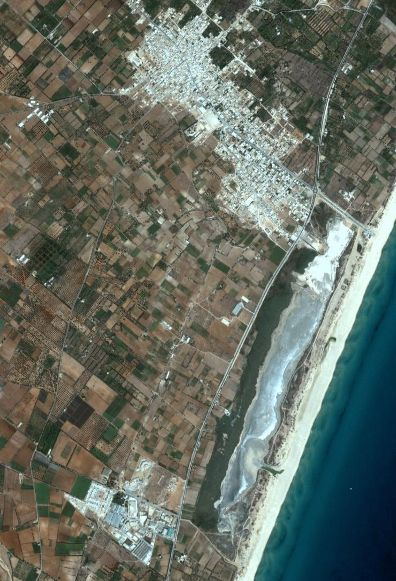
- Tazarka village, Tunisia
- Interactive map of Tazarka
- Country: Tunisia
- Governorate: Nabeul Governorate

Government
  - Mayor: Rachid Nachi (Nidaa Tounes)

Population (2014)
  - Total: 9,388
- Time zone: UTC+1 (CET)

Tazarka is a town and commune in the Nabeul Governorate, Tunisia, 66 kilometers south east of Tunis . As of 2004 it had a population of 7,613.

== History ==
The municipality of Tazarka was created by a decree on April 2, 1966.

== See also ==
- List of cities in Tunisia
