= Yahia Turki =

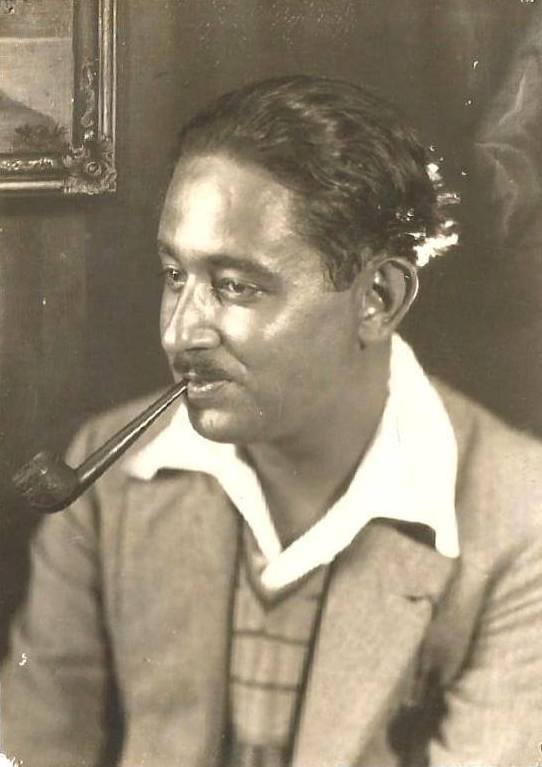
Yahia Turki

Yahia Turki (Arabic: يحيى التركي; born Yahia Ben Mahmoud El Hajjem; 1903 in Istanbul – 1 March 1969) was a Tunisian painter described as the "father of Tunisian painting". After the Independence in 1956, Yahia became the president of the École de Tunis, which was created in 1947 by Pierre Boucherle in an attempt to gather Tunisian artists, regardless of their religious, racial, or artistic background, and with the common interest of establishing a Tunisian painting style.

== Biography ==
Born in Istanbul to a Turkish mother and a Djerbian father, Turki studied first at Sadiki College and later at the Lycée Carnot de Tunis. At the same time, he attended a Koranic school, where his interest was piqued, for the first time, by the arrangement of form and colour on writing tablets. He pursued his secondary school studies at the Lycée Alaoui, where he had as a drawing teacher Georges Le Mare, who discovered the talents of the young novice and where he applied himself to learning the basics of the discipline. Faced with family pressures, Turki abandoned his studies and joined the civil service. He also received academic training at the centre for art studies, which in 1930 became the Tunis Institute of Fine Arts.

Turki experienced his first success in 1923 in the Tunisian salon. Turki's first painting was made in oil on canvas. He later obtained a scholarship and went to Paris in 1927, where he kept company with Albert Marquet and Lucien Mainssieux. He studied at the Centre d’art de Tunis with a scholarship from the French Protectorate which he achieved with the help of Alexandre Fichet and Pierre Boyer. In 1928, he stayed in France and took part in the Colonial Exhibition of French artists and the Salon des Indépendants. During his stay in Paris from 1926 to 1928 and from 1931 to 1935 he used to visit the studios of French artists the likes of Matisse and Derain.

On his return to Tunis in 1935, he exhibited a series of works with Parisian themes. He was a member of the Groupe des Dix in 1947 and one of the founders of the École de Tunis (Tunisian School) in 1948. In 1956, after Tunisian independence, he succeeded Pierre Boucherle as the president of the École de Tunis, a post he occupied until his death. He also became the vice-president of the Tunisian salon.

He made a great influence at younger artists who was eager to "reconcile Tunisian national identity within an inherited system of artistic practices". This concept of him easily can be traced in his works. Turki's architectural spaces, landscapes, still lives, and portraits depicted everyday life of Tunisia. In the 1950s he made a murals in the École d’Agriculture de Moghrane(Agricaultural School in Mograne). Among his student were the likes of Abdelaziz ben Rais (1903-1962), Hatem El Mekki (1918-2003) and Ammar Farhat (1911-1986).

Some of his works have been sold at auction, including Femme en sefsari which was sold at Artcurial Orientalism in 2013 for $9,576.

At age 52, Turki married a Tunisian, and had a daughter named Nazly.

== External sources ==
- Jonathan M. Bloom; Sheila S. Blair, eds. (2009). The Grove Encyclopedia of Islamic Art and Architecture, vol 1, 2 and 3. New York: Oxford University Press. p. 356.
