= Abdelaziz Gorgi =

Tunisian artist (1928–2008)

- Born: June 2, 1928; Tunis, Tunisia
- Died: January 10, 2008 (age 79); Tunis

Abdelaziz Gorgi (عبد العزيز القرجي; 2 June 1928 – 10 January 2008) was a Tunisian artist. He was one of the founders of the Tunis School of painting and one of the most prominent members of Tunisia's cultural scene.

== Biography ==
Gorgi was born in the Tunisian medina in 1928 and studied at the Tunis Institute of Fine Arts before beginning an artistic career in France. He helped create the Tunis School of painting which he led until 1983. He established his own art gallery, the Gorgi Gallery, in 1973 which mainly shows works of new Tunisian artists. His paintings and tapestries have been featured in exhibitions across the world. Gorgi taught drawing, ceramics and painting at the Institute of Fine Arts from 1959 to 1983.

An example of Gorgi's artwork

Gorgi was honored by President Zine El Abidine Ben Ali on several occasions. Once, Ali gave him the Grand Ribbon of National Merit for culture in 1999, as well as the President's Prize for innovation and creation on November 7, 2000. Besides these awards granted by the president, he received the Award of Merit in the field of visual arts in 1990.

Gorgi died on January 10, 2008, in Tunis, aged 79. He was buried at the cemetery of Sidi Bou Said the next day.

== Bibliography ==
- Tahar Guiga, Abdelaziz Gorgi : la quête de la lumière, éd. Cérès, Tunis, 1987 ISBN 978-2-85703-017-1
- Albert Memmi, Gorgi, éd. Alif, Tunis ISBN 9973-22-160-5
