= Hedi Turki =

Tunisian artist (1922–2019)

- الهادي التركي
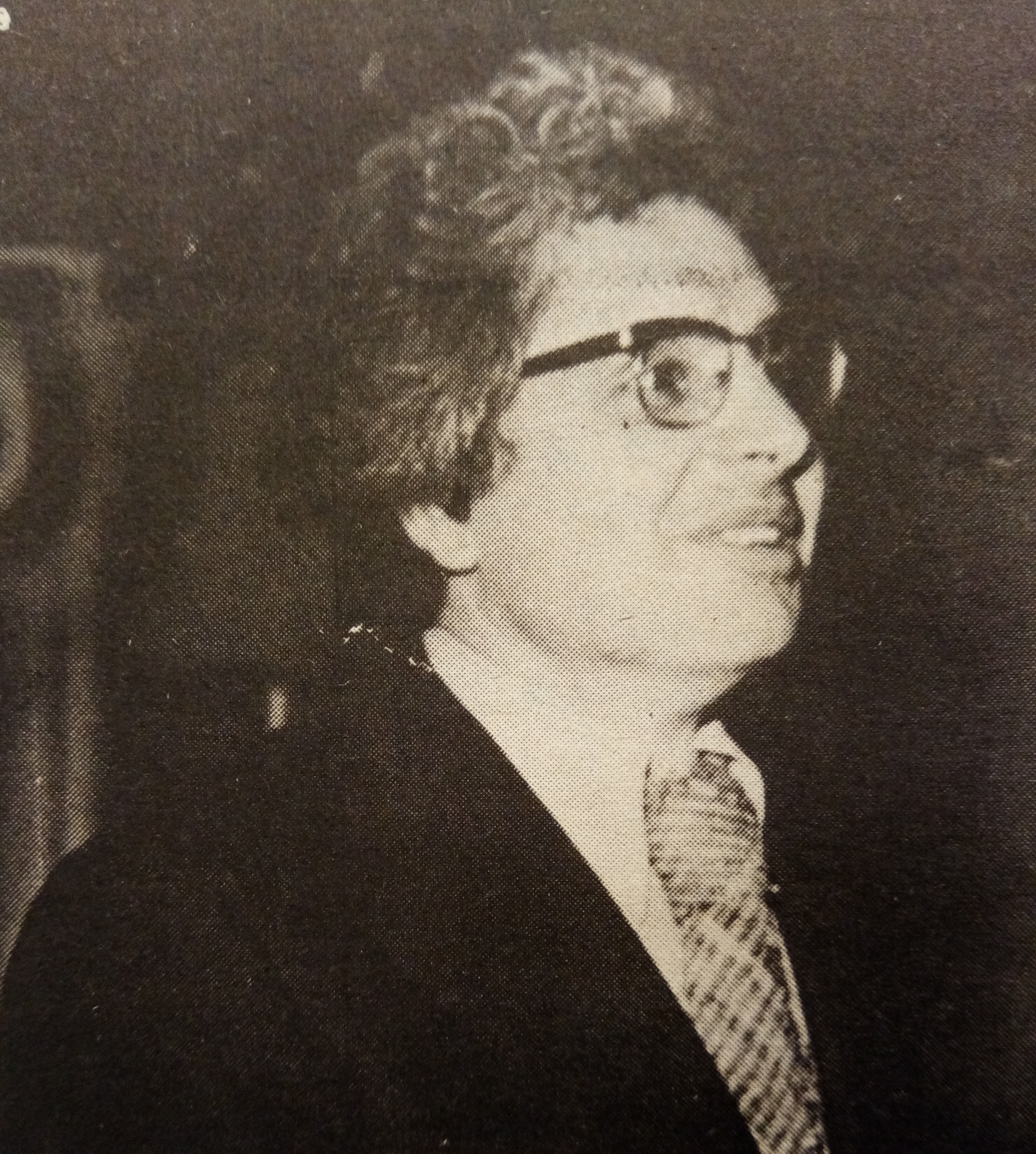
- Born: 15 May 1922; Tunis
- Died: 31 March 2019 (aged 96)
- Occupation: artist
- Style: abstract painting
- Movement: School of Tunis

Hedi Turki (15 May 1922 – 31 March 2019) was a Tunisian artist. He is considered to have been the pioneering force of abstract painting in Tunisia and was an influential member of the School of Tunis. His younger brother was Zoubeir Turki, who died in 2009.

== Biography ==
Turki was born in 1922 in Tunis to a family of Turkish origin. His grandfather, Hacı Hamid Semerci, immigrated from Turkey to Tunisia in 1870 as an Ottoman army major. Turki attended his primary education from 1928 to 1936, then went to the Sadiki College, before going to the Lycée Carnot between 1936 and 1940. He abandoned his studies after the death of his father, Mustapha, in 1939, in order to support his family as he was the eldest of seven brothers. He worked in numerous odd jobs such as an apprentice tailor, clerk, and laborer in oil mill. He married Jamila Skhiri in 1948 after the death of his mother in 1945.

He began to learn the principles of pictorial art, self-taught, and then joined the School of Tunis. In 1951 he completed a refresher course of two months in Paris at the Academie de la Grande Chaumiere. Then he obtained a scholarship for two years (1956-1657) at the Academy of Fine Arts in Rome. In 1959, he traveled for three months in the United States, where he discovered abstract art at Columbia University. From 1963 to his retirement in 1985, he taught art at the Ecole des Beaux-Arts in Tunis. He continued to travel and to study and work during his career, particularly in England (1971), Nigeria (1977) and the United States (1979).

Turki was instrumental in the founding of the School of Tunis, the establishment of the National Union of plastic and graphic arts of Tunisia, and the General Union of Arab Plastic Artists. His work evolved over time, a nationalist vocation at first, usually figurative like most members of the School of Tunis, it was then influenced by Abstract Expressionism, as inspired by his trip to the United States. Two American painters influenced Turki: Jackson Pollock (1912–1956) and Mark Rothko (1913–1970). Nonetheless, Turki's abstract style was marked by a deep sense of Tunisia and a somewhat religious aspect, which distinguishes it from other artists of his time.

Hedi Turki died on March 31, 2019, aged 96.
