= Tunis Institute of Fine Arts =

- المعهد العالي للفنون الجميلة بتونس
- Former name: Tunis School of Fine Arts
- Type: Academy of art
- Established: 1923
- Location: Tunis, Tunisia; 36.820884°N 10.180469°E
- Campus: 90 Ave Mohamed V, Tunis 1002
- Website: www.isbat.rnu.tn

The Tunis Institute of Fine Arts (Arabic: المعهد العالي للفنون الجميلة بتونس, romanized: al-Maʿhad al-ʿālī li-l-Funūn al-jamīla bi-Tūnus; French: Institut supérieur des beaux-arts de Tunis) is a fine arts institute in Tunis, Tunisia.

Founded in 1923, its seat was located at the Dribat Ben Abdallah near Tourbet el Bey with its former name Tunis School of Fine Arts. The Institute of Tunis contributed to the rise of the plastic arts movement in Tunisia, particularly after the Second World War.

== Notable students ==
Former students of the institute include:

- Azzedine Alaïa
- Abdelfattah Boussetta
- Antonio Corpora
- Ammar Farhat
- Safia Farhat
- Abdelaziz Gorji
- Mohamed Saadi
- Nadia Kaabi-Linke
- Mahmoud Sehili
- Hedi Turki
- Yahia Turki
- Zoubeir Turki
- Ali Zenaidi
