= Ammar Farhat =

Tunisian painter

Ammar Farhat (1911 – March 2, 1987) was a Tunisian painter. He was one of the ten members of the School of Tunis.

== Early life ==
Born to a poor family in Béja, Farhat moved with them to Tunis when he was seven years old. He experienced difficult periods in Tunis where he worked in several part-time jobs to secure his living. Farhat began his career as an artist at age fifteen by selling portraits of Egyptian singers to cafés.

== Painting career ==
His initial participation in public showings of his work was in 1938 at a collective gallery. Two years later, he established his first personal gallery at the headquarters of a local newspaper.

In 1949, Farhat joined the School of Tunis and won the Young Artist Prize, which helped him to move to Paris, where he became a member of the Parisian art scene. In 1984, he won the National Art Prize.

During his career, Farhat was interested the everyday life of workers and artisans. Rural life, reflective of his childhood, was the subject of many of his paintings.

== Legacy ==
He died on March 2, 1987, in Tunis. He came to be seen as one of the most important and influential Tunisian painters. A cultural centre in Béja is named after him.
