= List of schools in Tunisia =

This is a list of notable schools in the African country of Tunisia.

== Primary and secondary schools ==
Primary schools and secondary schools in Tunisia include:

- Al Jomhouriya Avenue Elementary School, Ezzahra
- American Cooperative School of Tunis, La Goulette
- École Canadienne de Tunis, Tunis
- Grombalia High School, Grombalia
- International School of Carthage, Carthage
- Istituto Scolastico Italiano "Giovan Battista Hodierna", Tunis
- Lycée Pierre Mendès France, Tunis
- Pioneer School of Ariana, Aryanah
- Pioneer School of Gafsa, Gafsa
- Sadiki College, Tunis
- Taïeb Mhiri School, Tunis
- The British International School of Tunis, La Soukra

== See also ==
- Education in Tunisia
- Lists of schools
