= Pioneer High School =

Pioneer High School, or similar names, may refer to:

== United States ==
- Pioneer High School (Los Angeles County, California)
- Pioneer High School, in Redding, California
- Pioneer High School (San Jose, California)
- Pioneer Valley High School, Santa Maria, California
- Pioneer High School (Whittier, California)
- Pioneer High School (Woodland, California)
- Pioneer Junior-Senior High School, Royal Center, Indiana
- Pioneer Valley Regional School, Northfield, Massachusetts, including high school
- Pioneer High School (Ann Arbor, Michigan)
- Pioneer Secondary Alternative High School, Prineville, Oregon
- Sharyland Pioneer High School, Hidalgo County, Texas
- Pioneer High School for the Performing Arts, in American Fork, Utah

== Other regions ==
- Pioneer State High School, Andergrove, Mackay, Queensland, Australia
- Pioneer House High School, Manchester, England
- Pioneer School of Ariana, Tunisia
- Pioneer School of Gafsa, Tunisia

== See also ==
- Pioneer Secondary School, Jurong West, Singapore
- Pioneer Middle School (disambiguation)
