= Tunis Carthage University =

Private university in La Soukra, Tunisia

- جامعة تونس قرطاج
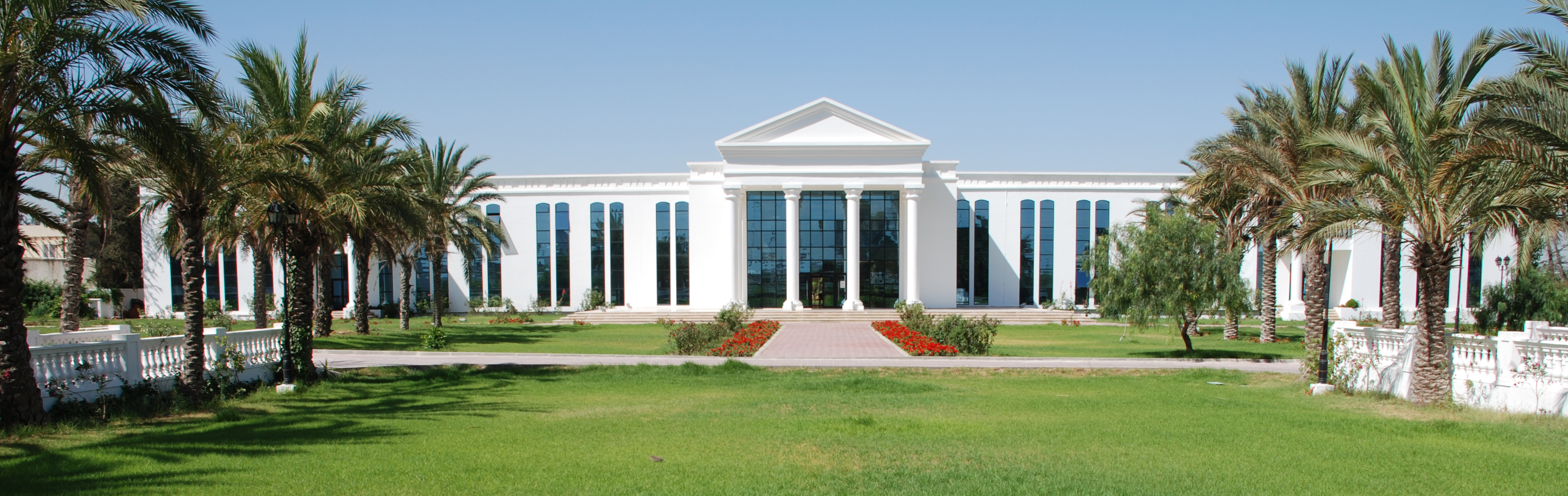
- Main building of the university
- Type: Private
- Established: 1993
- Founder: Khaldoun Ben Taarit
- President: Khaldoun Ben Taarit
- Rector: Béchir Chourou
- Academic staff: 30
- Students: 500
- Location: La Soukra, Tunisia; 36.878110°N 10.264621°E
- Campus: Urban (50,000 square metres (540,000 sq ft))
- Language: French, English, Arabic
- Website: utctunisie.com

Tunis Carthage University (Arabic: جامعة تونس قرطاج), also known as UTC, is a private university in La Soukra, a residential suburb near Tunis, Tunisia. Founded in 1993, it is one of the oldest private institutions of higher education in Tunisia.

All degrees awarded by UTC are recognized by the Ministry of Higher Education and Scientific Research and internationally.

== History ==
UTC established the first private school of architecture in Tunisia in 1999.

== Schools and degrees ==
=== Schools ===
UTC consists of two schools, units of training and research:

- Carthage School of Science and Engineering (Departments of Architecture and Design)
- Carthage Business School

=== Degrees ===
UTC offers the following programs:

- National degree in architecture obtained after six years of study, allowing registration with the National Order of Architects
- Bachelor's in Design, Space, and Interior Architecture
- Bachelor's in Business Administration
- Bachelor's in Higher Commercial Studies
- Bachelor's in Finance
- Master's in Administrative and Financial Management in cooperation with the University of Savoie
- MBA in Business Administration from the University of Versailles
- Master's in Finance and Stock Market

== Forums and innovations ==
Tunis Carthage University is a leader and innovator in higher education in Tunisia and North Africa. UTC organizes numerous forums and international events attracting professors from Tunisian, American, and European universities, researchers, and senior executives. Topics include economics, management, computer science, and architecture:

- International Forum on Knowledge Management with participation from:
  - Katia Passerini, New Jersey Institute of Technology, United States
  - Murray Jennex, San Diego State University, United States
- International Forum on Overall Business Performance with participation from:
  - Yvon Pesqueux, Chair of "Development of Organizational Systems"
  - Zeineb Ben Ammar Mamlouk, Head of the ETHICS Research Unit
  - Didier Stéphany, Director of "Sustainable Development" at AGAMUS Consult
  - Jamila Ysati, Communication Professional and Lecturer at the University of Metz
  - Olivier Zara, Founder and President of Axiopole
  - Jamel Gharbi, Senior Lecturer at the Université du Littoral Côte d'Opale
  - Hervé Serieyx, Vice-chairman of the supervisory board of Quartenaire Group
- Henri Ciriani on the theme "The Goal of Modernity is to Build Freedom".
- Henri Gaudin on the theme "Space and Architecture" with participation from:
  - Serge Degallaix, French Ambassador to Tunisia
  - Jean-Pierre Le Dantec, Engineer from École Centrale and Architect, professor, and Former Director of the École nationale supérieure d'architecture de Paris-La Villette
  - Marguerite Djerbi, Architect, Professor of Architecture, and Department Coordinator at UTC.

An exhibition and a conference on the architecture of mosques in Djerba and Berber housing in southern Tunisia were organized at UTC in October 2014 by Professor and Architect Stanley Ira Hallet.

== Academic trading room ==
UTC inaugurated the first academic trading room in Tunisia and the largest in Africa on 2 July 2015, in the presence of its president, Khaldoun Ben Taarit, and former Finance Minister and operation sponsor, Jalloul Ayed. Unique in Tunisia, it represents a significant asset for students of the Carthage Business School as well as for the Tunisian financial community.

== Popular culture ==
The TV series Njoum Ellil and Achek Assarab were filmed at Tunis Carthage University.
