= International School of Carthage =

- École Internationale de Carthage مدرسة قرطاج الدولية
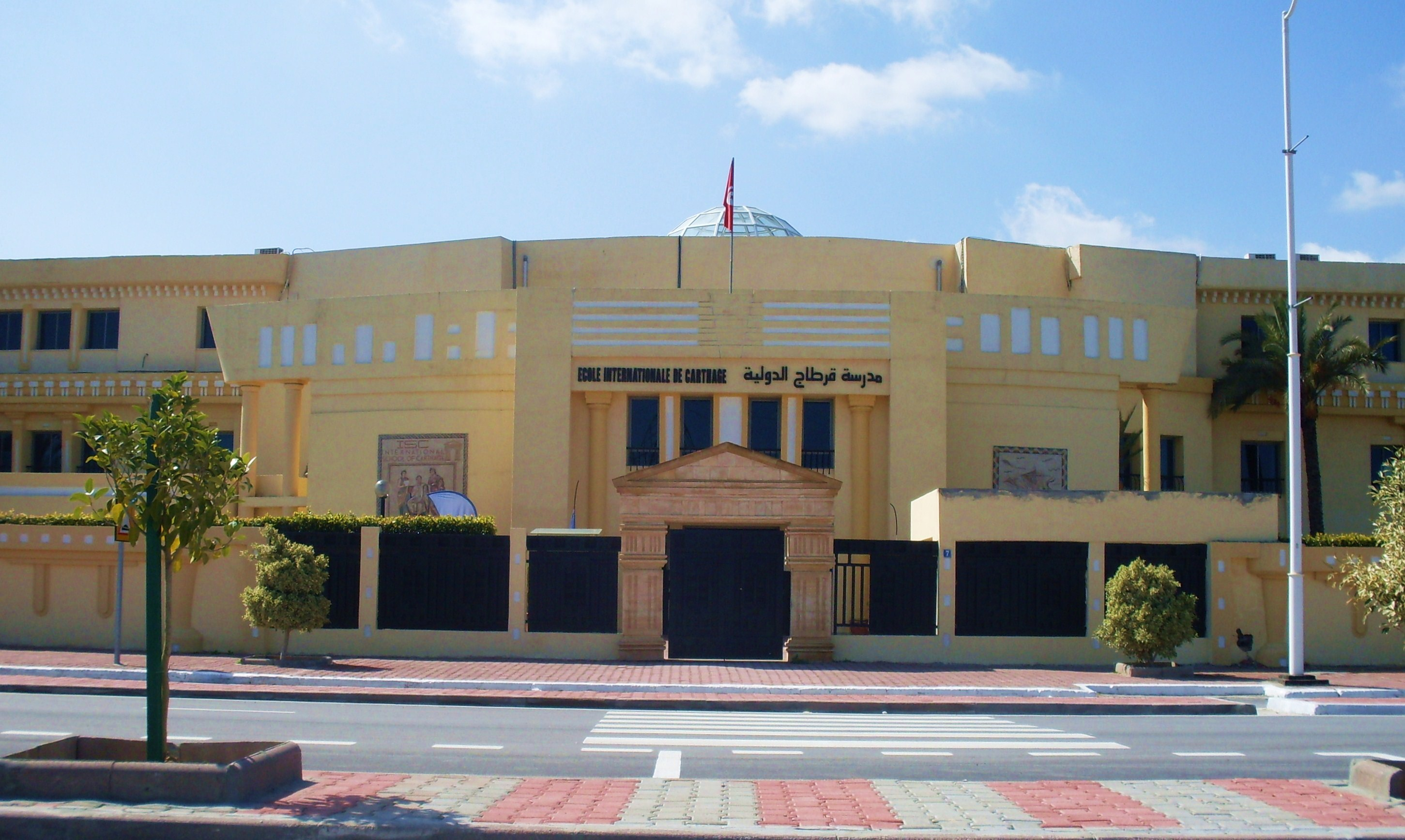

Location
- Les Jardins de Carthage – 2046, Ain Zaghouan, TUNIS – Tunisie; Tunis; Tunisia
- Coordinates: 36°51′36″N 10°18′14″E

Information
- Age range: 6 to 18
- Average class size: About 30
- Education system: French education system
- Language: French, English, Arabic, Italian, Derja, Spanish and German
- Colors: Yellow and Blue
- Website: iscarthage.com

International School of Carthage (ISC; French: École Internationale de Carthage, EIC; Arabic: مدرسة قرطاج الدولية) is a private Tunisian school in Les Jardins de Carthage built in the Late 1980s owned by Poulina Group that provides elementary and secondary education.

The International School of Carthage generates yearly an Estimation of 12.5 million USD according to this calculation:

20000 TND ( school year price) x 1800 (Estimated Number of Students)

Making it the biggest business in Les Jardins de Carthage making up 4.9% of its GDP (112 million USD)

== Culture ==
The ISC spirit is carried by every student and alumni. A strong sense of pride and belonging unites the community, visible in the way students wear their blue and yellow colors, and engage in regular events representing the school.

Academic excellence is at the heart of the school’s culture. ISC students consistently go on to pursue higher education at some of the world’s most prestigious institutions—whether in Tunisia, France, Switzerland, The United States, and more.

Beyond the classroom, ISC’s culture thrives through student-led initiatives, clubs, arts and sports. From debate and entrepreneurship to music and volleyball, students are encouraged to take ownership of their passions and transform them into impactful projects.

== See also ==
- List of schools in Tunisia
- Lycée Pierre Mendès France
- American Cooperative School of Tunis
- Sadiki College
