= United States Invitational Young Physicists Tournament =

Student physics tournament

The United States Invitational Young Physicists Tournament (USIYPT) is an annual physics research and debate tournament for high school students, held the last weekend in January. School-based teams of four students investigate several undergraduate-level research problems in preparation for the tournament. The competition itself consists of "physics fights," student-led debates over the quality of each team's solution. Teams are judged on their own solutions to the problems and on their ability to engage in evaluation and discussion of other teams' solutions. Rye Country Day School of New York currently holds four championships, the most out of any competing school. The Harker School of California and Phillips Exeter Academy of New Hampshire are currently tied for second-most, with three each. The 2024 tournament was hosted on February 3–4, 2024, at North Carolina State University, with Rye Country Day School winning the champion title for the first time in seven years.

== History ==
The United States sent teams to the International Young Physicists' Tournament several times in the 2000s, and achieved a second-place finish in 2005. The nonprofit United States Association for Young Physicists Tournaments was incorporated in 2005, initially for the purpose of supporting and training the US team as well as to spread the pedagogical methodology of preparing and conducting the "physics fight." In 2007, the USAYPT organized their own Young Physicists Tournament, inviting school-based teams from around the world to debate over a slate of four research problems. The one-day event at the North Carolina School of Science and Math (NCSSM) included five teams, all from the United States; Woodberry Forest School won the inaugural championship.

The 2008 tournament, also at NCSSM, included the first "international" team: Brisbane Girls Grammar School. They faced Woodberry Forest School, a boys' boarding school in central Virginia. In the final physics fight, Brisbane's Sarah Thang and Samantha Luck outdueled Woodberry's Chris McLamb, Cameron Wilhoit and Robert Bauer for the title.

For 2009 and 2010, the event was moved to Woodberry Forest School. Raffles Institution of Singapore beat out an eight-team field for the 2009 title. However, the "snowmaggedon" blizzard of February forced cancellation of the 2010 tournament. Instead, two informal mini-tournaments were held in April, one at Woodberry Forest School, one at the Harker School in California.

The USIYPT moved to Oak Ridge Associated Universities for 2011 and 2012, and expanded to a two-day, six-round event. Teams and jurors toured Oak Ridge National Laboratory in between sets of physics fights, viewing the High Flux Isotope Reactor and the Spallation Neutron Source. Official sponsorship in 2011 came from the University of Tennessee department of physics, among others. The Harker School won in 2011; Rye Country Day School of New York won in 2012. Oak Ridge High School won the first-ever Clifford Swartz Trophy for top performance in the tournament's poster session.

The 2014 tournament was held at the Harker School in San Jose, California. The Harker School won the title with playoff victories over Woodberry Forest School and Shenzhen Middle School on the "Magnet Stack" and "Ball Stack" problems. Guilderland High School of New York won the Clifford Swartz Trophy for best poster.

In 2015, the USIYPT moved back to Woodberry Forest School. The final rounds were switched to a pool-play format. The Harker School and Woodberry Forest met twice in those final rounds, with Harker edging Woodberry 79-77 for the 2016 title. Other finalists included Rye Country Day, who were 1/10 of a point off Woodberry's pace; and first-time USIYPT participant Renmin University High School of Beijing, China.

Second-year participant Phoenixville Area High School of Pennsylvania topped the standings after the preliminary rounds in the 2016 USIYPT. They, Harker, Rye Country Day School, and Shenzhen Middle School competed in the final rounds, with Shenzhen coasting to the championship.

At the 2017 tournament at the University of the Sciences, the Harker School was the highest ranked of the six teams who entered the playoff rounds. Rye Country Day School emerged from those rounds with a convincing victory of 77-72 against RDFZ of Beijing.

In 2018, Randolph College hosted the largest-ever USIYPT, including fifteen schools from all over the US and the world. Phillips Exeter Academy won their first-ever trophy in their fourth year of participation.

At the 2019 tournament at Rye Country Day School, Phillips Exeter Academy won their second straight championship, with first-time attendees Phillips Academy Andover in second place. In the late stages of the tournament, Swartz Trophy winners Pioneer School of Ariana, Tunisia and The Harker School competed in the first partially student-juried physics fight.

In 2020, Cary Academy won their first championship in school history, after facing Woodberry Forest School, Phillips Academy Andover, and Phillips Exeter Academy in the final rounds.

Due to COVID, the 2021 tournament was hosted online. The Nueva School, Phillips Exeter Academy, and Woodberry Forest School made the three-team round-robin final round. Phillips Exeter Academy emerged on top with their third-ever championship.

In 2023, The Nueva School won their second championship in a row, overhauling their preliminary round points disadvantage against Phillips Exeter Academy to win 86.99 to 79.80 in the final round. Of the 11 participating teams, 6 made it through the preliminary rounds and competed in the final.

In 2024, Rye Country Day School won their third championship ever, winning with a final score of 84.44 after facing Phillips Academy Andover, Phillips Exeter Academy, and The Nueva School in the final rounds. They placed first with a margin of 0.16 points over Phillips Exeter Academy's final score of 84.28, an extremely close win earned by Rye Country Day School's thoughtful and insightful oppositions. Other finalists included Cary Academy and Woodberry Forest School.

In 2026, Rye Country Day School won with an extremely close margin of 1.51 points; the runner-up was The Nueva School.

== The Physics Fight ==
The USIYPT consists of six preliminary rounds and a set of final rounds. In each round, called a "Physics Fight," a student from the reporting team presents a 10-minute summary of their research into one of the four official tournament problems. Next, a student from another team engages the reporter in a 12-minute conversation about the reporting team's project. This opponent is charged with helping the audience understand the strengths and weaknesses of the report by means of a series of discussion questions. Only after this conversation is complete are jury members allowed to question the presenting students directly. Teams are judged as much on their ability to ask and answer questions in the physics fight as on the quality of their initial presentations.

== Teacher education ==
Unusual among science competitions, the USIYPT aims to improve physics teaching skills as well as student understanding of the subject. High school teachers are participating members of each school's research team. The sponsoring organization chooses problems for each tournament that are "nontrivial, but not impossible," whose solutions are not necessarily unknown to practicing professional physicists, but are generally new to high school teachers and students. Research is expected to be conducted primarily in each team's school, with direction and assistance from a teacher at that school.

== Results ==
Year	Location	Champion	Second place	Swartz Trophy	Bibilashvili Award	Greg Jacobs Award
2026	Phillips Academy	Rye Country Day School	The Nueva School	Cary Academy	Jericho High School, Trinity School	UG School
2025	Rye Country Day School	Cary Academy	Phillips Academy	Trinity School	The Harker School	Maggie L. Walker Governor's School
2024	NC State	Rye Country Day School	Phillips Exeter Academy	UG School	Maggie L. Walker Governor's School	Shenzhen Middle School
2023	The Nueva School	The Nueva School	Phillips Exeter Academy	The Harker School		Trinity School
2022	NC State	The Nueva School	Cary Academy	Andover		
2021	Online	Phillips Exeter Academy	Woodberry Forest School	The Nueva School		
2020	Phillips Exeter Academy	Cary Academy	The Nueva School	The Harker School		
2019	Rye Country Day School	Phillips Exeter Academy	Phillips Andover Academy	Pioneer School of Ariana		
2018	Randolph College	Phillips Exeter Academy	Harker School	Shenzhen Middle School		
2017	University of the Sciences	Rye Country Day School	RDFZ Beijing	Vanke Meisha Academy		
2016	Randolph College	Shenzhen Middle School	Rye Country Day School	Nanjing Foreign Language School		
2015	Woodberry Forest School	The Harker School	Woodberry Forest School	Nanjing Foreign Language School		
2014	The Harker School	The Harker School	Shenzhen Middle School	Guilderland High School		
2013	The Harker School	Shenzhen Middle School	The Harker School	Nanjing Foreign Language School		
2012	Oak Ridge Associated Universities	Rye Country Day School	Woodberry Forest School	Oak Ridge High School		
2011	Oak Ridge Associated Universities	The Harker School	Rye Country Day School			
2009	Woodberry Forest School	Raffles Institution	Woodberry Forest School			
2008	North Carolina School of Science and Math	Brisbane Girls Grammar School	Woodberry Forest School			
2007	North Carolina School of Science and Math	Woodberry Forest School	Rye Country Day School			

== List of Participating Schools ==
- The Harker School, California – 12 tournaments, 3 championships
- Phillips Exeter Academy, New Hampshire – 6 tournaments, 3 championships
- Rye Country Day School, New York – 15 tournaments, 3 championships
- The Nueva School, California – 5 tournaments, 2 championships
- Shenzhen Middle School, China – 9 tournaments, 2 championships
- Woodberry Forest School, Virginia – 14 tournaments, 1 championship
- Cary Academy, North Carolina – 6 tournaments, 1 championship
- Brisbane Girls Grammar School, Australia – 2 tournaments, 1 championship
- Raffles Institution, Singapore – 1 tournament, 1 championship
- Pioneer School of Ariana, Tunisia – 8 tournaments
- Nanjing Foreign Language School, China – 5 tournaments
- Qingdao No. 2 High School, China – 4 tournaments
- Vanke Meisha Academy, China – 4 tournaments
- Princeton International School of Mathematics and Science, New Jersey – 4 tournaments
- High School affiliated with Renmin University, China – 4 tournaments
- UG School, Tbilisi – 3 tournaments
- Phillips Academy Andover, Massachusetts – 3 tournaments
- Phoenixville Area High School, Pennsylvania – 3 tournaments
- Wildwood School, California – 3 tournaments
- Episcopal High School, Virginia – 2 tournaments
- Oak Ridge High School, Tennessee – 2 tournaments
- North Carolina School of Science and Mathematics– 2 tournaments
- Oregon Episcopal School – 2 tournaments
- Vistamar School, California – 2 tournaments
- Guilderland High School, New York – 2 tournaments
- Pioneer School of Manzeh 8, Tunisia – 2 tournaments
- Spartanburg Day School, South Carolina – 2 tournaments
- High School of Jur Hronec, Slovak Republic – 1 tournament
- Calverton School, Maryland – 1 tournament
- Madeira School, Virginia – 1 tournament
- Georgian English-Spanish School, Tbilisi – 1 tournament
- Deep Run High School, Virginia – 1 tournament
