= ACST =

ACST may refer to:

- American Cooperative School of Tunis, a private international school in La Goulette, Tunisia
- Australian Central Standard Time, a time zone (UTC+9:30)
