= Borj Louzir =

Borj Louzir برج الوزير Borj El Ouzir (census spelling)
- Village / Sector of populated place
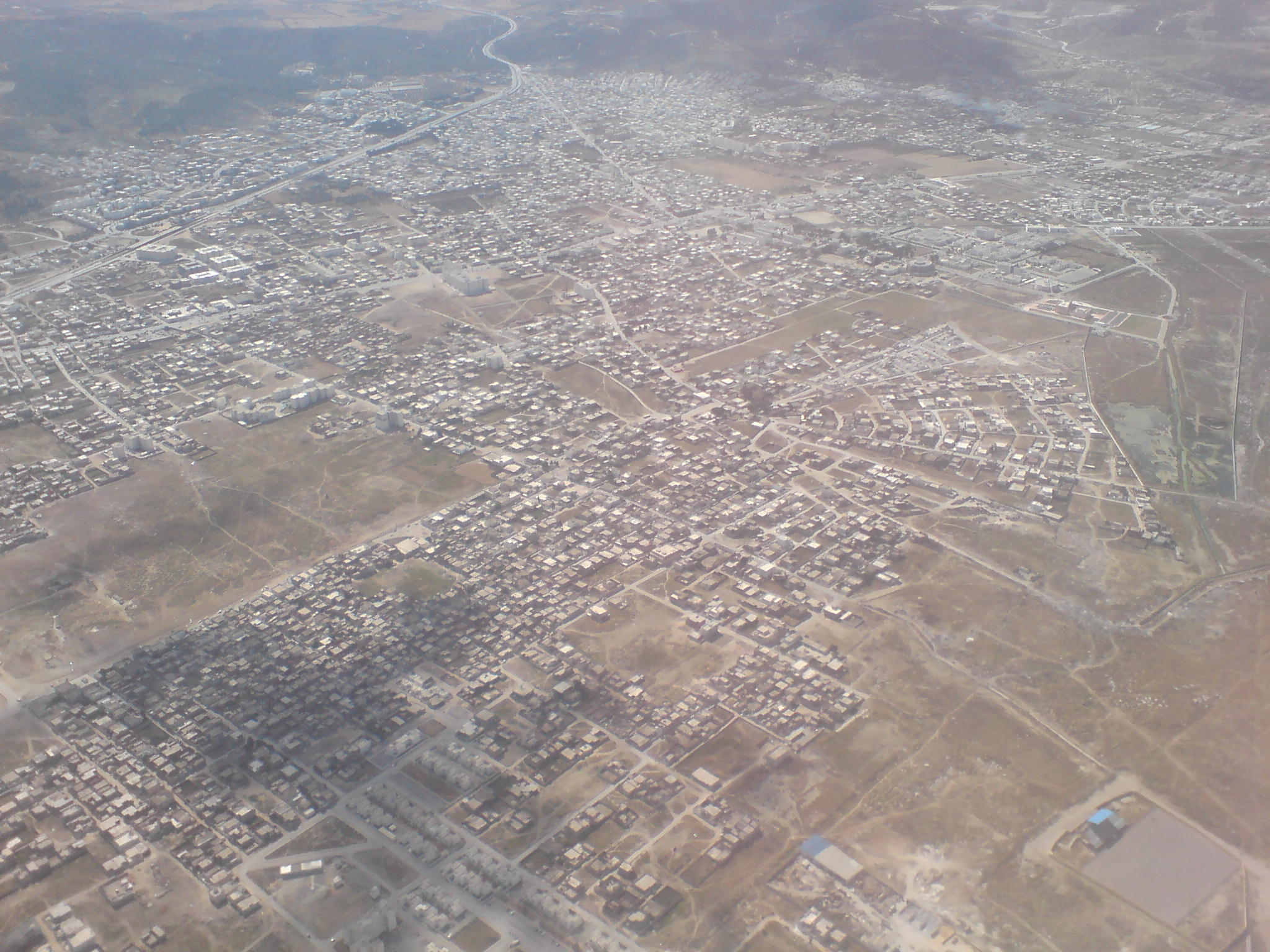
- Aerial view of the Ariana/La Soukra area
- Interactive map of Borj Louzir
- Coordinates: 36°51′46″N 10°12′41″E
- Country: Tunisia
- Governorate: Ariana Governorate
- Municipality: La Soukra

Area
  - Total: 2.911 km^{2} (1.124 sq mi)

Population (2024)
  - Total: 15,406
  - Density: 5,292/km^{2} (13,710/sq mi)
- Time zone: UTC+1 (CET)
- Postal code: 2073

Borj Louzir (Tunisian Arabic: برج الوزير), is a Tunisian village dependent on the municipality of La Soukra, in the Ariana Governorate.

== Geography ==
Borj Louzir is bordered by the central sector of La Soukra and the locality of Chotrana (both part of the same municipality and delegation).

== See also ==
- List of cities in Tunisia
- Chotrana
- La Soukra
- Ariana
