= Mutuelleville =

Coordinates: 36°49′56″N 10°10′29″E

Mutuelleville is a district of Tunis, the capital of Tunisia. It is located north of the downtown area, and borders Parc du Belvédère to the southwest. The main street through Mutuelleville is Avenue Jugurtha.

Mutuelleville is an upscale residential neighborhood of Tunis. It features many villas, green spaces, calm streets, and hosts a significant expatriate and diplomatic community. Originally developed during the French colonial period, it continues to host foreign embassies, diplomatic residences, and international organizations such as NGO offices.

Administratively, Mutuelleville is often attached to El Menzah IV and includes sub-areas such as Cité El Mahrajène, which has more apartment buildings, and Notre-Dame, a higher-elevation area with villas.

== Notable locations ==
Notable locations in Mutuelleville include:

- Lycée Pierre Mendès France – a French-language secondary school.
- University dormitories:
  - Haroun Errachid dormitory, located at 9 Rue Haroun Errachid.
  - Fattouma Bourguiba dormitory, located on Rue Tahar Memmi.
- Chedli Zouiten Stadium – a local sports venue.

Nearby in the adjacent central business and diplomatic district (on Avenue de la Ligue Arabe, overlooking the city and adjacent to Parc du Belvédère) is the Sheraton Tunis Hotel.
