= Wang Jisi =

Chinese political scientist (born 1948)

- 王缉思
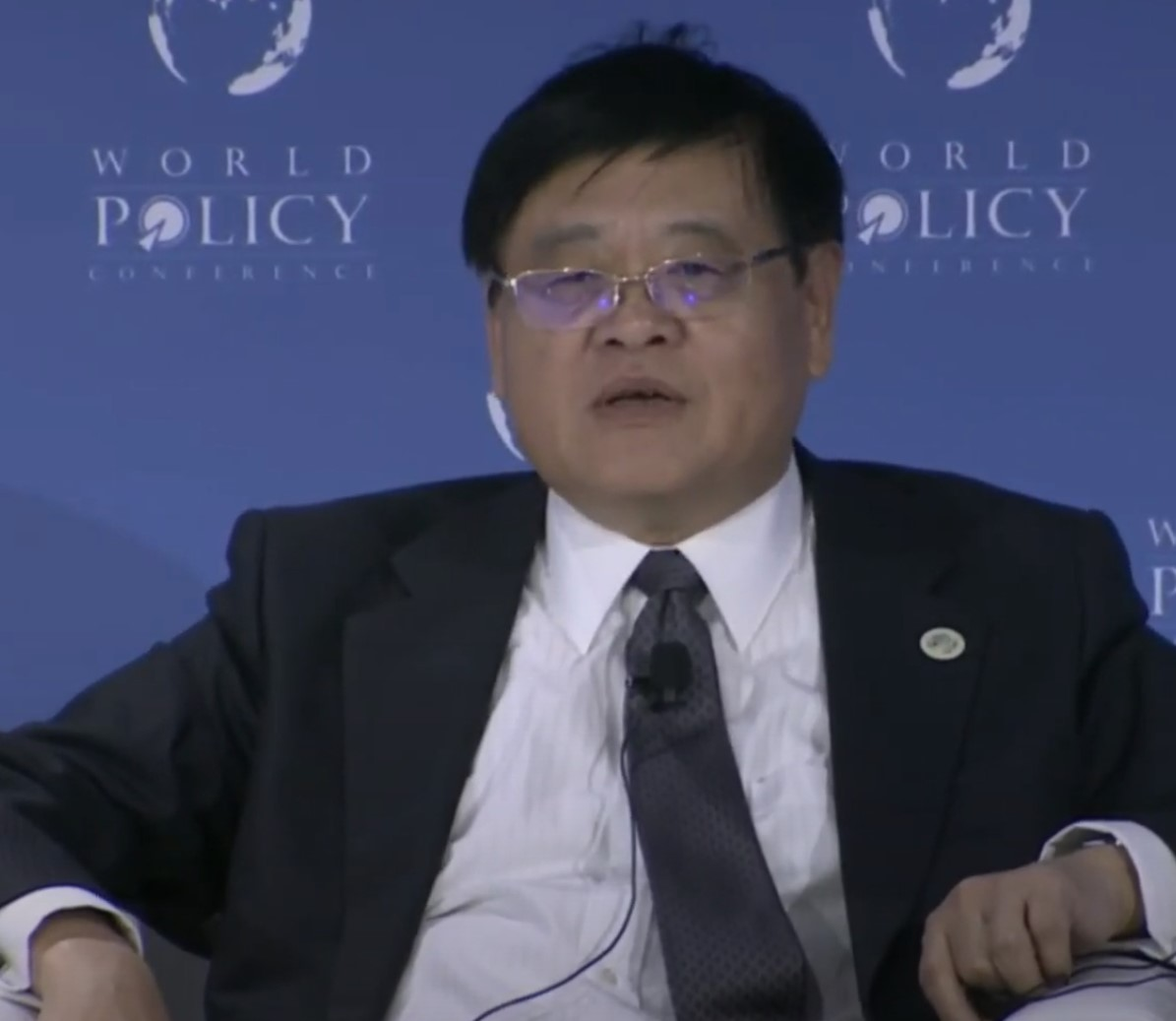
- Wang at the World Policy Conference in 2019
- Born: Wang Jisi; November 1948 (age 77–78); Canton, Guangdong, Republic of China
- Education: Peking University (B.A., M.A.)
- Alma mater: Affiliated High School of Peking University
- Employer: Peking University

Wang Jisi (Chinese: 王缉思; pinyin: Wáng Jīsī; born November 1948) is a Chinese academic and international relations scholar. He currently serves as the president of the Institute of International and Strategic Studies at Peking University. He served as the Dean of Peking University's School of International Studies from 2005 to 2013 and has held the position of Peking University Boya Chair Professor since 2017.

== Early life ==
Wang was born in Canton (now Guangzhou), in November 1948, but has spent most of his life in Beijing. He graduated from the Affiliated High School of Peking University in 1968.

After finishing high school at the height of the Cultural Revolution, Wang was sent to the countryside to serve as a sent-down youth worker in Inner Mongolia. There, he spent seven years laboring in the East Ujimqin Banner. In 1975 he was reassigned to Henan, recruited as a laborer at the Sanmenxia Dam hydroelectric plant.

In 1978, two years after the end of the Cultural Revolution, Wang was admitted into the International Politics program at Peking University, where he received his bachelor's and master's degrees.

== Career ==
Wang taught at the Peking University's Department of International Politics from 1983 to 1991. Wang was a visiting academic at Oxford University (1982–83), University of California, Berkeley (1984–85), University of Michigan (1990–91), and Claremont McKenna College (2001).

From 1992 to 2005, Wang was Director of the Institute of American Studies, at the Chinese Academy of Social Sciences; he was invited to the S. Rajaratnam School of International Studies as endowed chair from 21 to 25 February and from 2 to 8 March 2002. at what was then known as Institute of Defence and Strategic Studies, within Nanyang Technological University.

Wang was Dean of the School of International Studies at Peking University from 2005 to 2013. He was the founding president of the university's Institute of International and Strategic Studies. He was concurrently director of the Institute of International Strategic Studies at the Central Party School of the Chinese Communist Party from 2001 to 2009.

From 2008 to 2016, he was a member of the Foreign Policy Advisory Committee of the Ministry of Foreign Affairs of the People's Republic of China.

He was Global Scholar at Princeton University from 2011 to 2015, including 9 months at the Woodrow Wilson School of Public and International Affairs.

Wang was on the International Crisis Group Board of Trustees. Wang has served on the board of directors of the nonprofit Teach For China.

Wang has published numerous English articles in the fields of U.S. foreign policy, China's foreign relations, Asian security, and global politics. Writing in 2024, researcher Mark Leonard of the European Council on Foreign Relations describes Wang as "one of the most renowned international relations scholars in China and an expert on U.S.-China relations."

According to Alex Joske, Wang has been "closely associated with China's Ministry of State Security for decades", joining undercover MSS officers, including then-head of the MSS United States operations bureau Lin Di and a spy previously declared persona non grata for falsely posing as a journalist, on trips to Japan and the US. He also served as an early member of the China International Culture Exchange Center, a front run by the MSS' 12th Bureau.

== Research and policy positions ==
In the early 2000s, Wang coined the term "hot peace" to describe the nature of the China-United States relationship. As of 2024, Wang describes the "hot peace" as having become "much hotter in many dimensions" including economic competition, cybersecurity, military activity in the South China Sea, and the potential hot spot of Taiwan.

Responding to the United States Obama administration's Pivot to Asia, in 2012 Wang wrote that China should "March West" and increase its ties to countries near its west, including through infrastructure connectivity and encouraging the flow of trade.

Wang's analysis generally focuses on the idea that the current international order is dissolving. Rather than confronting the United States, Wang's view is that China should use this opportunity to develop relationships with countries that view themselves as ignored by the United States. As of 2024, Wang's advice to Chinese policymakers is that they should avoid confrontation with the United States, manage the bilateral relationship carefully, and expand its international activities into less contentious areas.

== Awards ==
In 2005 and 2012, Foreign Policy named Wang one of its Top 100 Global Thinkers.

== Publications ==
=== Reports ===
- Breaking the Ice: The Role of Scholarly Exchange in Stabilizing U.S.-China Relations, Center for Strategic and International Studies, April 7, 2023 (co-authored with Scott Kennedy)

=== Articles ===
- Does China Prefer Harris or Trump? Foreign Affairs, August 1, 2024 (co-authored with Hu Ran and Zhao Jianwei)
- America and China Are Not Yet in a Cold War, Foreign Affairs, November 23, 2023
- America and China Need to Talk, Foreign Affairs, April 6, 2023 (co-authored with Scott Kennedy)
- The Plot Against China, Foreign Affairs, June 22, 2021
