= Affiliated High School of Peking University =

Public secondary school in Haidian, Beijing, China

- 北京大学附属中学
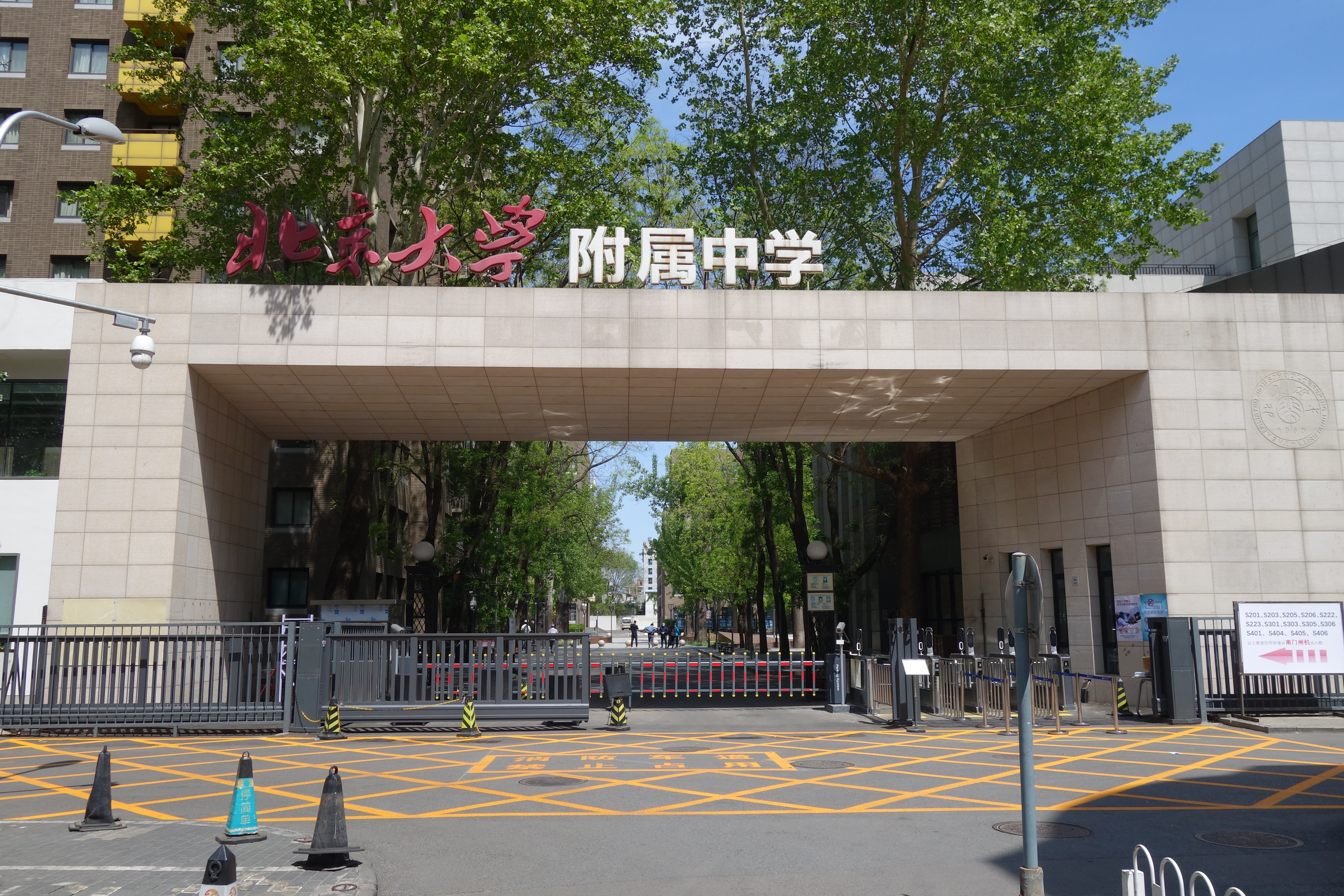
- South gate
- 82A Daniwan Road, Haidian District; Beijing, 100190; China

Information
- Other name: BDFZ; PKUS
- School type: Public secondary school
- Founded: 1960; 66 years ago
- Principal: Ma Yuguo (马玉国)
- Language: Chinese, English
- Affiliations: Peking University
- Website: pkuschool.edu.cn

The Affiliated High School of Peking University (北京大学附属中学; abbreviated PKUS and commonly known as BDFZ) is a public secondary school in Haidian District, Beijing, affiliated with Peking University. It was founded in 1960 on the basis of Beijing No. 104 Secondary School as part of the university's four-level system linking primary school, secondary school, undergraduate and graduate education. It was designated one of Beijing's first key secondary schools in 1978 and a municipal demonstration senior high school in 2003.

The school has attracted national attention in two periods. At the start of the Cultural Revolution in 1966, its student "Red Flag Combat Group" received Mao Zedong's public support alongside the Red Guards of Tsinghua University High School, and it was among the first schools in Beijing where large-scale violence took place. Under principal Wang Zheng, from 2009 to 2021, it abolished fixed classes in its senior division in favour of course selection, academies and residential-style houses, a reform that was widely debated and drew mixed assessments.

== History ==
=== Founding (1960–1966) ===
The school's predecessor, Beijing No. 104 Secondary School, had been formed from a former workers' and peasants' accelerated school attached to Tsinghua. In 1960, to bridge university and secondary education, Peking University under its Party secretary and president Lu Ping decided to establish an affiliated secondary school on that basis. Yin Qizhuo, the university's deputy dean of academic affairs, served concurrently as the first principal, Liu Meide became executive vice-principal and Party branch secretary, and 43 young assistants and lecturers were sent from the university's departments to teach at the school.

=== Cultural Revolution ===
In June 1966 students at the school formed the "Red Flag Combat Group" (红旗战斗小组). Like the Red Guards at Tsinghua University High School, it attacked school administrators and teachers and the pre-1966 education system. On 1 August 1966 Mao wrote a letter expressing "warm support" for both groups, and at the first mass rally of Red Guards in Tiananmen Square on 18 August, the group's Peng Xiaomeng spoke on the Tiananmen rostrum on behalf of the Red Guards. According to the historian Wang Youqin, BDFZ was among the first schools in Beijing where administrators and teachers were beaten; the vice-principal Liu Meide was among those assaulted and humiliated, and students from "bad" family backgrounds were also abused. From 1968 to 1980 the school was headed by the chairmen of its revolutionary committee, Jia Shiqi and then Meng Guangping.

=== Key school (1977–2009) ===
After the national college entrance examination was restored in 1977, 15 of the school's students were admitted to university ahead of their year, the most of any Beijing secondary school; in 1978 it became one of Beijing's first designated key secondary schools. A second division set up in 1979 was renamed Peking University Second Affiliated High School in 1983. From 1987 the school ran experimental junior and senior classes linking primary and secondary education, and in 1988 and 1994 it opened physics, chemistry and science experimental classes commissioned by the State Education Commission. In 1997 the Second Affiliated High School was merged back into BDFZ, which also opened an experimental class with direct progression to Peking University. In 1998 BDFZ began running Beida Resources Middle School, a private school at Changchunyuan sponsored by Peking University Resources Group. The West Teaching Building opened in 2002, and in 2003 the school received its status as a Beijing demonstration senior high school.

=== Wang Zheng's reforms (2009–2021) ===
In April 2009 Wang Zheng, an alumnus of the school and previously principal of Shenzhen Middle School, returned as principal. From 2010 the senior division abolished homeroom teachers, grade leaders and administrative classes, and introduced course selection with students moving between classrooms, term-based scheduling, mentors and peer leaders. Students were grouped into cross-grade, self-governing "units", renamed houses (书院) in 2013. From 2011 the school set up academies according to students' goals, including Xingzhi, Yuanpei, Boya and Dalton, and from 2014 Chinese and English classes replaced the national textbooks with complete original works.

The results of the reform were contested. Supporters valued the choice and autonomy it gave students, while critics said that some students lacked self-discipline or lost a sense of belonging, and some parents objected to their children being treated as "experimental subjects". The number of graduates admitted to Peking University and Tsinghua University fell from about 60 a year before 2014 to 20 in 2021, tenth among Beijing high schools. In 2019 the school restored the national textbooks and required courses in the first year of senior secondary, and in 2021 it introduced ability-level classes in five core subjects. On 14 December 2021 Peking University removed Wang as principal about six months before his term was due to end, prompting public debate over quality-oriented versus exam-oriented education.

=== Since 2022 ===
On 16 March 2022 Peking University appointed Ma Yuguo, a professor at its College of Chemistry and Molecular Engineering, as the school's principal and deputy Party secretary. In July 2022 BDFZ Experimental School, the former Beida Resources Middle School, became a public school run by Peking University and was merged into BDFZ. The school marked its 65th anniversary at its Huangzhuang campus on 12 October 2025.

== Academic structure ==
=== Academies and houses ===
The senior division is organised into six academies and a preparatory division. Xingzhi Academy teaches the nine subjects of the national curriculum; Yuanpei and Boya academies serve students with particular strengths in the sciences and the humanities respectively, the latter drawing on teachers from Peking University's departments of Chinese, history and philosophy; Weiming Academy supports students who need closer help with their studies; Shuren Academy comprises centres for visual and performing arts, athletics, and information and general technology; and the preparatory division handles preparation for domestic university entrance.

Student life is organised around nine houses: Gewu, Zhizhi, Chengyi, Zhengxin, Mingde, Hongyi, Xijing, Zhishan and Xinmin. Each year the houses compete in four school-wide events: a drama festival, a dance festival, a football tournament and a basketball tournament.

=== Dalton Academy ===
Dalton Academy, the school's international division, was founded in 2010 for students planning to study abroad for their undergraduate degrees. Modelled on the Dalton Plan, it uses small classes, student course selection and mentoring. According to the school's admissions information, its fees are 100,000 yuan per student per year.

=== Junior division ===
BDFZ also has a junior secondary division. In 2018 it joined the Yuanpei Academy's "1+3" programme, creating a curriculum that links junior and senior secondary study.

== Campus ==
The main campus is the Huangzhuang campus at 82A Daniwan Road, Haidian. Its principal buildings are the east, west, south and north teaching buildings, a library and the Xinjian Gymnasium. The West Teaching Building, with a floor area of 14,900 square metres, opened in September 2002; a branch of the Peking University Library opened at the school in 2009; and the Xinjian Gymnasium was completed in 2016.

== Education group ==
The BDFZ Education Group was established in 2017. According to the school, its member schools include, in Beijing, the Shijingshan, Chaoyang Future, Peking University Health Science Center, Xisanqi, Xinxin and Fengtai schools, and outside Beijing, schools in Haikou, Taizhou, Putian and Shenzhen. The Shenzhen school group, run jointly with the government of Shenzhen's Futian District, opened in September 2024.

== Public attention ==
In May 2021 a short video titled A Day at the Affiliated High School of Peking University trended on Weibo. Showing students starting class at 8 a.m., choosing their own courses and taking part in fencing and drama, it set off an online debate about unequal access to educational and social resources, in which the phrase "small-town swot" (小镇做题家) became widely used.

== Principals ==
Name	Term	Notes
Yin Qizhuo	1960–1966	Concurrently deputy dean of academic affairs, Peking University
Jia Shiqi	1968–1971	Chairman of the revolutionary committee
Meng Guangping	1971–1980	Chairman of the revolutionary committee and principal
Xia Xuezhi	1980–1984	Acting principal
Chen Jiangang	1984–1985	
Xia Xuezhi	1985–1992	
Mao Meihua	1992–1997	
Zhao Yulin	1997–2001	
Kang Jian	2001–2009	Principal and Party secretary
Wang Zheng	2009–2021	
Ma Yuguo	2022–present	

Source: school website.

== Notable alumni ==
- Wang Jisi, scholar of international relations and former dean of the School of International Studies at Peking University
- Xu Bing, artist and former vice-president of the Central Academy of Fine Arts
- Mao Xinyu, military officer and grandson of Mao Zedong
- Chen Xiaonan, television presenter and journalist
- Zhang Zilin, model, actress and Miss World 2007
- Wang Zheng, educator, former principal of Shenzhen Middle School and of BDFZ
