= Education in Tunisia =

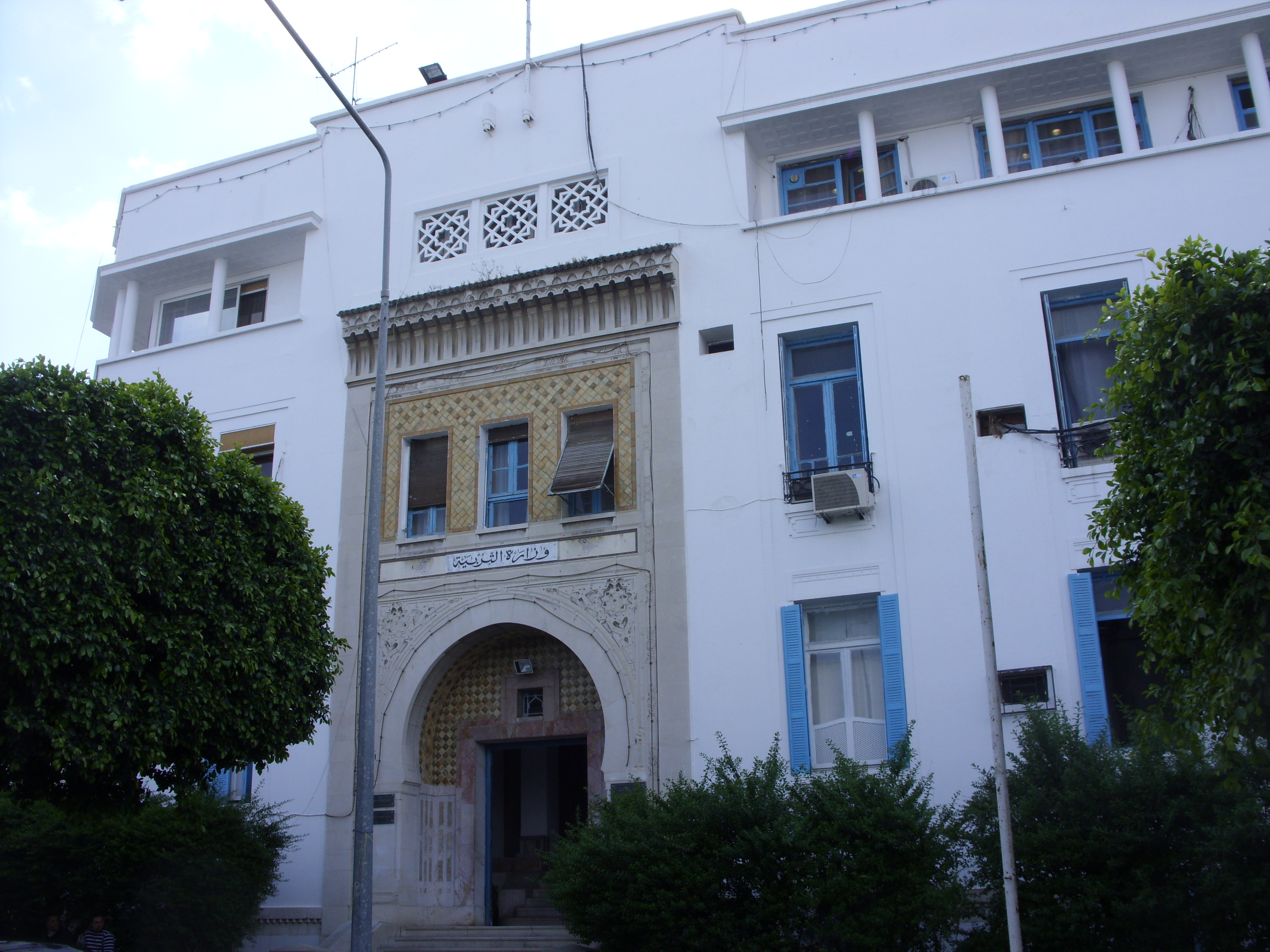
Tunisian education ministry building

Since gaining independence from France in 1956, the government of Tunisia has focused on developing an education system which produces a solid human capital base that could respond to the changing needs of a developing nation. Sustained structural reform efforts since the early 1990s, prudent macroeconomic policies, and deeper trade integration in the global economy have created an enabling environment for growth. This environment has been conducive to attain achievements in the education sector which placed Tunisia ahead of countries with similar income levels, and in a good position to achieve MDGs. According to the HDI 2007, Tunisia is ranked 90 out of 182 countries and is ranked 4th in MENA region just below Israel, Lebanon, and Jordan. Education is the number one priority of the government of Tunisia, with more than 20 percent of government’s budget allocated for education in 2005/06. As of 2006 the public education expenditure as a percentage of GDP stood at 7 percent.

== Literacy ==
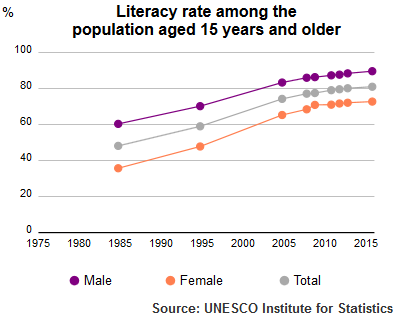

== Education Sector Reforms ==
Tunisian education system was built on the French model, therefore, the focus of the education reformers was to Arabize curriculum and faculty at nation’s schools and universities. Tunisia adopted a phased approach towards Arabization. Given the number of Francophone nationals and the absence of qualified Arabized teachers to teach scientific subjects, policy makers maintained French both as a foreign language and as a medium of instruction for math and science in primary education. Humanities and social sciences were Arabized incrementally, initially in primary and subsequently in secondary education. In the 1970s, the decision was made to extend Arabization to all subjects in post-primary education, except vocational, professional, and technical tracks. At the university level, French was maintained as the language of instruction in technical institutes and science faculties. There have also been several other reforms since independence to further improve the education system at all levels:

1) Education is an important Law that actually passed in 1958 emphasized technical and vocational education, and the training of a new breed of educators who are qualified to teach the new curriculum emphasizing Arabic language, literature, Islamic thought and history and geography of the Tunisian and North African region.

2) Then a Higher Education Law was passed that placed all government recognized institutions of higher learning and scientific research under the umbrella of University of Tunis, an institute that was established in 1960, by incorporating several existing higher schools and institutes.

3) In the academic year of 1990-91, the New Education Act introduced an increased length of instruction at the primary and secondary levels from 12 to a total of 13 years. It also made it mandatory for students of ages between 6–16 years of age to attain basic education training.

4) Tunisia introduced competency-based approach in school curriculum in 2000, and revised textbooks accordingly.

5) The 2002 Education Act emphasized the importance of ICT in the education sector.

== Education System ==
The academic year runs from September to June and examinations are held in late June or early July.

=== Early Childhood Care and Education(ECE) ===
The Tunisian government has shown strong commitment towards pre-school education. Pre-school education is to be imparted in establishments or specifically designated places to the children from three to six years of age. In Tunisia the pre-school education is provided primarily in three settings:

Kindergartens- These are socio-educational institutions that come under the supervision of Ministry of Women, Family, and Childhood and they belong to either private sector, the quasi-public local authorities or specialist associations. There has been considerable improvement in the coverage of kindergartens from 7.1 percent in 1990 to 14 percent in 2000.But this rate is still low primarily because most 3 to 6-year-olds do not attend kindergarten.

Kouttabs - These religious institutions also cater for children between 3 and 5 years of age. Their task is to initiate them into learning the Quran as well as reading, writing, and arithmetic. They are under the supervision of the Ministry of Religious Affairs. Reforms have enabled to increase the number of these schools from 378 in 1987 to 961 in 2007. These Kottabs host 25,194 children, 11,138 of whom are girls. They are run by mold dibs (teachers) among whom 121 hold degrees in Islamic Sciences, and 60 hold university degrees. A presidential project, “Tomorrow Tunisia”, has been launched to further support Kouttabs so that they fulfill their education mission of consolidating values of religion.

Preparatory year's is also an integral part of basic education but it is not compulsory. It is supervised by the Ministry of Education and Training and is provided in public, private and quasi-public primary schools. The gross enrollment rate at pre-primary has increased steadily since 2000 from 15 percent to 22 percent in 2003.

=== Basic Education ===
Enseignement de base consists of nine years of school education and is divided into two distinct stages: 6 years of primary and 3 years of preparatory education (lower secondary). At the end of 9 years students sit for examen national de fin d’Études de l’enseignement de base, success in which leads to the Diplôme de Fin d’Études de l’Enseignement. Students are required to score above 50 percent at the end of sixth grade to progress to the lower secondary level. Although there is a high percentage of students who fail the important grade 6 examinations. Now due to government efforts, the number of students who have to repeat grade 6 is decreasing. In 1991-92, 26 percent of students had to repeat grade 6. But in 1999-2000 that number has dropped to 18 percent. The drop out rate at the primary level is 6 percent and it halved from the drop out the percentage of 12 percent in 2000. The gross enrollment ratio at primary and secondary is greater than 1 which shows that more girls than boys are enrolled at these two education levels. The share of private enrollment at primary level has been slowly increasing from 0.7 percent in 2000 to 0.9 percent in 2003 and in 2007 the private enrollment share was 1.4 percent. The gross enrollment ratio at lower secondary level in 2007 stood at 113 percent, a jump of about 7 percentage points from the GER in 2006.

Also at the beginning of the 2007/2008 school year, 9 Pioneer middle schools were launched to offer gifted students early care that will allow them to pursue their studies in pioneer schools in scientific, literary and art fields, with competent and experienced teachers.

=== Secondary (upper) education ===
The four years of secondary education are open to all holders of Diplôme de Fin d'etudes de l’Enseignement de Base where the students focus on entering university level or join the workforce after completion. The Enseignement secondary is divided into two stages: general academic and specialized.

In the academic stream all students follow a common curriculum for one year after which they choose one of the five specializations from language arts, sciences, and economics and management in case the student is specializing in science at the end of the second year he must choose again but this time between math, experimental sciences, computer sciences or technical sciences . The language of instruction in technical, scientific and mathematics fields is French. At the end of the fourth year of secondary studies, students take Examen National du Baccalauréat. Students are tested on average on six subjects. Those students who complete the secondary cycle, but fail the baccalaureate are awarded a certificate of completion that can later be used for entry into the workforce or for entry to further studies in a private school. In 1995 42.5 percent of baccalaureate takers were successful. However, Tunisia has been appearing in TIMSS since 1999 and has been one of the top performing countries in the Arab region. In 2007, Tunisia ranked second in mathematics and third in science in all of the Arab countries appearing in TIMSS , inInternationalwith scores 420 and 445 respectively. The gender parity index of gross enrollment ratio at the secondary level was 1.1 percent in 2006, implying higher female enrollment than male enrollment at the secondary level.

=== Technical and Vocational Track ===
Professional and vocational programs are administered by the Ministry of Employment, and in more specific disciplines by individual ministries such as agriculture and tourism. Students can opt to enroll in a two-year vocational program leading to the award of dice the Certificat d’Aptitude Professionnelle. These students who have completed the first two years of secondary education may enroll in two-year vocational programs leading to the award of the Brevet de Technicien Professionnel, which in turn gives access to two-year Brevet de Technicien Supérieur programs. The enrollment in TVET at the secondary level has also been rising since 2004.The current(2007) enrollment ratio in TVET is almost 10 percent, with a higher percentage of males enrolled in these programs.

=== Higher education ===
The higher education system in Tunisia has experienced a rapid expansion and the number of students has more than tripled over the past 10 years from approximately 102,000 in 1995 to 365,000 in 2005. The gross enrollment rate at the tertiary level in 2007 was 31 percent, with gender parity index of GER of 1.5. The private university system in Tunisia, accounting for about one percent of students, remains small because the regulatory environment does not encourage foreign investment or the use of part-time teachers in private universities.

In Tunisia in 2005–2006, there were 178 public institutions of higher education among which there were 13 universities, 24 higher institutes of technological studies and six higher institutes of teachers' training. The Higher Education Ministry (HEM) supervises 155 institutions and 23 are under the co-supervision of the HEM and other ministries. In addition HEM recognizes 20 university-level private institutions. The public university system is virtually free and student loans are not available for students enrolled in a private university, making it difficult for private universities to attract students who cannot afford to pay the fees.

During the last decade, in addition to creating seven new universities, the Government of Tunisia (GOT) has made progress in i) in improving the internal efficiency of programs and pass rates in applied science programs and selected short-term programs such as at the higher institutes of technology (Instituts supérieurs des études technologiques) (ii) introducing shorter term professional programs with more relevance; and (iii) granting greater autonomy to universities to give them the flexibility to respond to the changing environment and adapt academic programs to the needs of the economy.

Access to post secondary education is guaranteed to all students holding a baccalaureate diploma. The admission process is centrally controlled through the national university orientation system. Although this centralized system has been criticized for its rigidity as it leaves students unsatisfied by the disciplines they have been placed in. The pass rate of the Baccalaureate is not very high in Tunisia. On average 60 percent of students fail the baccalaureate each year. Recently since 2005–06, the government has been trying to implement reform that is based on the European three-tier model of bachelor’s, master's and doctoral degrees. This reform is known as LCD :licence (three years) master’s (two-years), doctorate (five years). The new academic credit hour system is meant to give students greater flexibility in designing their study tracks, while allowing them to earn and transfer credits between institutions both domestically and internationally.

At the university level the first cycle of studies in the academic stream is of two years, which leads to the award of Diploma d’Etudes Universitaires du Premier Cycle. This first degree is regarded as a preparatory one. Then in most other fields, the second cycle leads to the award of Maitrise, which is considered the first degree in Tunisian university system. Later the Diplome d’Etudes Approfondies (DEA) is awarded to Maitrise holders after a further two-year study and the preparation and defense of a thesis. DEA is also a prerequisite for entry into a doctoral program.

Despite this progress, however, numerous challenges remain, as student enrollments in public universities are projected to increase by about 6.6 percent annually, reaching approximately 470,000 (all categories) in 2010, while at the same time, the quality and relevance of education are in need of updating. At 2 percent of GDP, public spending on higher education is already higher than in most countries in the world. Unemployment among university graduates is increasing and the employability of graduates in modern, export-oriented sectors is weak. Mechanisms and incentives to promote quality at the university level are for the most part inadequate and universities cannot fully exercise the autonomy that will help them to better respond to the changes in the labor markets and requirements of a global economy. In sum, due to the projected increase in enrollment, the GOT is faced with a challenge of meeting public demand for higher education in an equitable way, and improving quality in a cost-efficient manner, while responding to existing and new labor market needs.

== ICT Integration in Education ==
Tunisia is supported by international organizations (e.g., the World Bank, Microsoft, and Apple in incorporating ICT at all levels of education. These organizations provide support to the government in implementing ICT staff training programs, supporting professional development, providing networking opportunities; researching, developing and evaluating new policy approaches in setting up ICT infrastructure in the country. Some of the innovative projects were the Mobile laboratories and Mobile Internet Buses connected to the internet via satellites to target schools in rural and remote areas so as to reduce the digital divide. Then launched in 1999Global. Teenager Project was launched that led to global classroom debates in cyber space. Tunisia also hosted the second phase of the world summit on information systems.

In 2004, there were 22,000 computer (0.28 computers for every class), but by 2006 there were 57,000 computers (0.71 computers for every class). Although the presidential election program is working towards achieving 1 computer per class by 2009. It is foreseen that the number of trained teachers will increase to 80,000 in 2009 from 60,000 in 2006. All higher education institutes are connected to the internet by El Khawarizmi Calculus Center, which is the official public internet service provider to higher education institutes. The integration of ICT in education is further reinforced by Tunisian Virtual School and the Virtual University of Tunis.

=== TVS ===
Tunisia was one of the first countries in North Africa and Arab countries to pioneer in the field of distance education and e-learning through the launch of TVS in January 2002. It provides fee interactive courses, revision modules, assistance and ICT training.

=== Virtual University of Tunis ===
It was established as a government initiative in 2003, and it now provides 20 percent of the courses through e-learning. It does not cover all specialties but it does award diplomas and certificates. There are 207 modules, representing more than 8,000 hours, that are ready for use. The university currently has 10 functional access centers, and by 2009 there will be 200.

== Adult Education ==
The Tunisian government introduced the National Program for Adult Literacy (PNEA) in April 2000. It is supervised by the Ministry of Social Affairs and Solidarity. To support this program various civil society organizations and NGO’s have contributed immensely to ensure that adults could gain skills useful in the current job market. For example, in 2006-2007, 5000 young people aged below 30, 40 of whom women, took part in introductory vocational training courses.

== See also ==
- List of schools in Tunisia
- List of universities in Tunisia
