= Scott Kennedy (political scientist) =

American political scientist

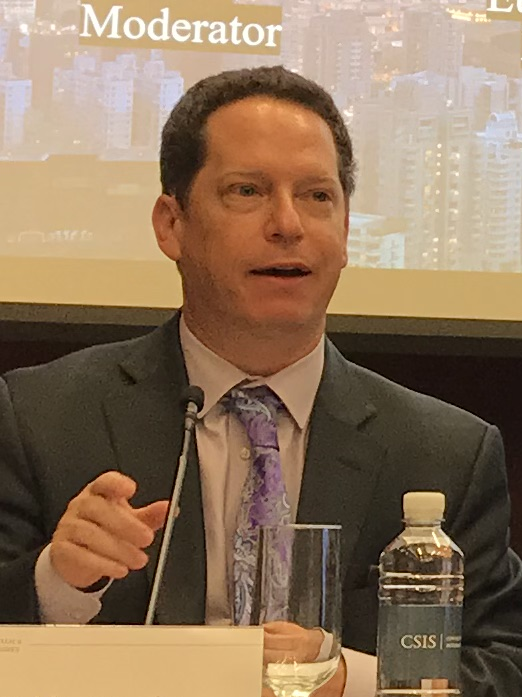
- Other name: 甘思德
- Education: University of Virginia (BA), Johns Hopkins University SAIS (MA), George Washington University (PhD)
- Occupations: Political scientist, China specialist
- Employer: Center for Strategic and International Studies

Scott Kennedy is an American political scientist and China specialist currently serving as senior adviser and Trustee Chair in Chinese Business and Economics at the Center for Strategic and International Studies (CSIS).

== Education ==
Kennedy holds a BA from the University of Virginia, a MA in China studies from Johns Hopkins University SAIS, and a PhD in political science from George Washington University.

== Career ==
Kennedy was a professor at Indiana University from 2000 to 2014.

In September 2022, he became the first western scholar to visit China for in-person exchanges with PRC officials and business executives since the COVID-19 lockdowns.

== Views ==
Kennedy writes that China's Belt and Road Initiative was designed to advance the domestic economy and "to help make use of China's enormous industrial overcapacity and ease the entry of Chinese goods into regional markets."

=== U.S.-China Relations ===
Kennedy told Reuters about US Treasury Secretary Janet Yellen's July 2023 China visit: "The accomplishment of the meeting was the meeting itself, not specific issues. We're starting from a point in which the two sides have barely spoken to each other in three and a half years and the level of mistrust and cynicism has been layered on so thick." In a Politico interview, he called Yellen's trip "long overdue" and said: “It’s nuts that the leading officials presiding over the world’s two largest economies have barely spoken to each other in over three years. They should not be strangers.”

In a July 2023 NYT interview about the Chinese economy, Kennedy said: "China’s decision making is as hidden from our view as it has ever been, but China’s economic weakness is obvious for all to see, even China’s leaders, which can’t help but be one source of the recent moderation in foreign policy and willingness to engage Washington."

== Publications ==
=== Books ===
- The Business of Lobbying in China, Harvard University Press, 2008

=== Reports ===
- The Power of Innovation: The Strategic Value of China's High-Tech Drive, CSIS, March, 2026
- U.S.-China Scholarly Recoupling: Advancing Mutual Understanding in an Era of Intense Rivalry, CSIS, March 27, 2024
- The State and the State of the Art on Philanthropy in China, International Journal of Voluntary and Nonprofit Organizations, July 24, 2019 (co-authored with Angela Bies)
- China's Risky Drive into New-Energy Vehicles, CSIS, November 19, 2018
- The Fat Tech Dragon, CSIS, August 29, 2017

=== Articles ===
- Why Is Xi Not Fixing China's Economy? Foreign Policy, June 3, 2024
- China's Latest Document Number One: Promoting Rural Development, CSIS, February 16, 2024 (co-authored with Scott Rozelle)
- America and China Need to Talk, Foreign Affairs, April 6, 2023 (co-authored with Wang Jisi)
- Xi-Biden Meeting May Help End China's Destructive Isolation, Foreign Policy, November 14, 2022
- China's Neighbors Are Navigating COVID-19, Beijing, and Washington, Foreign Policy, September 13, 2022
- US and China: Things will get worse before they get worse, The Hill, December 21, 2018
- Protecting America's Technology Industry From China, Foreign Affairs, August 2, 2018
- Chinese Firms Don't Want to Pay Afghanistan's Costs, Foreign Policy, August 27, 2021
- It's Time for China Analysts to Stop Talking Past One Another, Foreign Policy, August 24, 2016
- Let China Join the Global Monetary Elite, Foreign Policy, August 20, 2015

=== Edited volumes ===
- Chinese State Capitalism, CSIS, October 7, 2021 (with Jude Blanchette)
- China's Uneven High-Tech Drive: Implications for the United States, CSIS, February 27, 2020
- Global Governance and China The Dragon's Learning Curve, Routledge, September 17, 2017
