= Pioneer Middle School =

Pioneer Middle School may refer to the following schools in the United States:

- Pioneer Middle School (Tustin, California)
- Pioneer Junior High School, Upland, California
- Pioneer Middle School (Porterville, California)
- Pioneer Middle School (Florida), a school in Cooper City, Florida
- Pioneer Middle School (Washington), a school in the Steilacoom Historical School District in DuPont, Washington
- Pioneer Middle School (Washington), a school in the Walla Walla Public Schools District in Walla Walla, Washington

== See also ==
- Pioneer Ridge Middle School, Chaska, Minnesota
- Pioneer Trail Middle School, Olathe, Kansas
- Pioneer High School (disambiguation)
