= British International School of Tunis =

Location
- 49 rue du Parc 2036; La Soukra; Tunisia
- Coordinates: 36.8687011°N 10.25887650°E

Information
- Founder: Meriem Milad
- Headteachers: Karyn Walton (Primary); Stephen Phipps(Secondary)
- Years: Early years to Year 13
- Education system: British Curriculum
- Language: English
- Houses: Boudicca, Cleopatra, Hannibal and Glyndŵr
- Website: bistunis.info

The British International School of Tunis (commonly abbreviated to BIST) is a private school in La Soukra, Ariana Governorate, Tunisia that provides elementary and secondary education. It enrolls about 250 students, aged 3 to 18, from Key Stage 1 to 5. The new sixth form opened in September 2020. The school is accredited by COBIS, has a membership to IAPS, and is inspected under the ISI framework. The school generates an estimated US$4.5 million yearly.

== Primary school ==
In terms of academics, BIST follows the English National Curriculum and is the first school in Tunis to be accredited by the Council of British International Schools (COBIS).

== Secondary school ==
The British International School of Tunis (BIST) Secondary School is for children aged 11 – 18 and is located in Le Kram, just south of Carthage.

BIST secondary follows the English National Curriculum.

The curriculum at Key Stage 4 is a two-year course of study, culminating in external examinations based on the English National Curriculum. These examinations allow for a range of achievements from A*-G, with A*-C being considered the standard academic passing grade. The core curriculum at Key Stage 4 consists of Mathematics, English (First Language, Second Language and Literature), the Sciences, Physical Education and PSHCE. Students will then select from a wide range of available subjects at the school including Business Studies, History, Art and Music.

== Sixth form school ==
The BIST Sixth Form opened in September 2020, offering a range of International A-Level and BTEC qualifications.
