= Pioneer High School for the Performing Arts =

- 555 E Main Street; American Fork, Utah; United States

Information
- Type: public charter high school
- Established: August 2012
- Closed: August 2018
- School district: Alpine School District
- executive director: Dallyn Bales
- Faculty: 9 (2015–16)
- Grades: 9–12
- Gender: coeducational
- Enrollment: approx. 120 (August 2018)
- Website: www.pioneercharterschool.org

Pioneer High School for the Performing Arts was a four-year charter high school within the Alpine School District in American Fork, Utah. It was founded in 2012 and closed in 2018.

== History ==
Pioneer High School for the Performing Arts was founded by a group of performing artists living in the region: Caleb Chapman, a saxophonist and youth band director, who became music director; Mindy Smoot Robbins, owner of a Broadway theatre academy; Kymberly Mellon, an actress and director; Sam Payne, another musician; and Derryl Yeager, director of Odyssey Dance Theatre, who became vice chairman of the governing board. Their objectives in founding the school were to reduce the stress of artistic students trying to combine their arts training with a conventional school day and to train performing artists more thoroughly. It opened in 2012 with operations in both American Fork and Lehi and a target enrollment of 1,000. The school started out contracting with Lincoln Interactive, a Pennsylvania company, to provide academic courses entirely online, with mornings reserved for the arts training.

The Utah State Charter School Board placed the school in warning status in 2013 and on turnaround in 2015. In 2016 the state gave it an F grade, but in June 2017 the Charter School Board reduced the school's warning and probation status. By November 2017 the state assigned the school a C grade.

Enrollment was at one point over 450 but fell to 120 after the school terminated the contract for online classes, at that time with Harmony Educational Services; it rose to approximately 140 in the 2016–17 academic year, 70 more students were successfully recruited for 2017–18, and for 2018–19 numbers had been raised from 108 to approximately 120. Retention between 2015–16 and 2016–17 was 42.4%, the lowest of the more than 25 charter schools in the county; it subsequently rose to a high percentage. To boost enrollment, the school had advertised online and on billboards and students had marched in parades. The academic programs were housed until 2017 in a building at 704 S. 600 East St. shared with Aristotle Academy, another charter school that also opened in 2012 but closed in 2017; plans for a new building were not realized.

Gil Jarvie became executive director (principal) in January 2017; he was succeeded in May 2018 by Dallyn Bayles, an actor and singer.

On August 1, 2018, after it was discovered that in order to be financially viable Pioneer High would need 169 students, not the 150 previously estimated, plus additional funds, the governing board decided not to reopen the school for the fall term later that month as planned.

== Demographics ==
In the 2015–16 school year, Pioneer High had a minority enrollment of 13% (predominantly Hispanic), with a diversity score of 0.24. 2% were eligible for a free lunch. The graduation rate was 80-89%.
