= Pioneer School of Gafsa =

The Pioneer School of Gafsa (French: Lycée Pilote de Gafsa; Arabic: المعهد النّمـــوذجــي ڨفصة), commonly known as LPG, is a secondary school located in "Sidi Ahmed Zarroug" in Gafsa, Tunisia.

It is one of the most prestigious schools in Tunisia, known for its high-quality education and its highly competitive environment. it enjoys a success rate of 100% at the Baccalaureate exam.

== History ==
The school was founded on September 15, 1989, in the context of a policy aimed at uniting the elites in special schools. Students used to get in at the age of twelve. At the time, the school had 7 different grades. But following educational reforms, the secondary education has been split into two parts, and students enter this school at the age of 15, after achieving grades among the highest in the national 9th grade examination. This is the fact that makes it an elite school.

== Campus ==
The school has two refectory, a kitchen, four dormitories, eighteen classes, three specialized classes, Six laboratories, a library and a multipurpose hall.
