= Shenzhen Middle School =

Public school in Shenzhen, Guangdong, China

Coordinates: 22°33′17″N 114°06′59″E

- 深圳中学
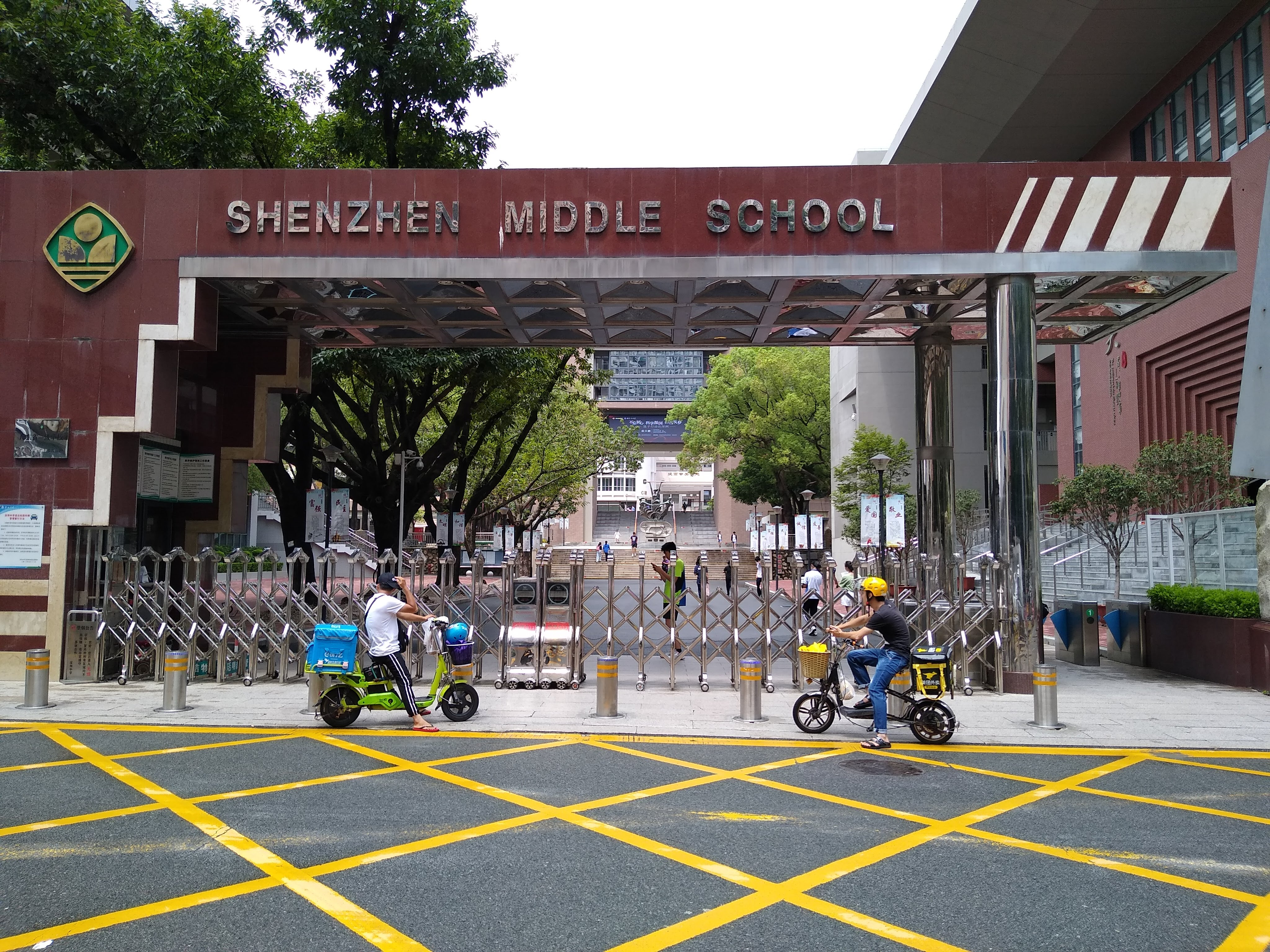
- Shenzhen, Guangdong; China

Information
- Type: Public School
- Mottoes: Building a world-class high school with Chinese characteristics.
- Established: 1947
- Founder: Zhang Shoulin
- Principal: Zhu Huawei
- Faculty: ~400
- Enrollment: ~7600
- Student to teacher ratio: 19:1
- Campus: City, 107,602 square metres (1,158,220 ft^{2})
- Song: 凤凰花又开
- Mascot: "Knowledge" (A Sculpture)
- Website: www.shenzhong.net

Shenzhen Middle School
- Simplified Chinese: 深圳中学
- Traditional Chinese: 深圳中學
- Literal meaning: Shenzhen Secondary School (Zhongxue means a secondary school, and the literal meaning "middle school" is not the same as a United States middle school)
Transcriptions
Standard Mandarin
- Hanyu Pinyin: Shēnzhèn Zhōngxué
Yue: Cantonese
- Jyutping: sam1 zan3 zung1 hok6

Shenzhen Middle School (Chinese: 深圳中学) is a secondary school in Luohu, Shenzhen, Guangdong, China. Founded in 1947, it was made the only provincial key high school (magnet school) in Shenzhen in 1983. In November 1993, it became one of the first Class-One Schools of Guangdong Province. In 1998, Shenzhen Middle School merged with Honghu Middle School, and the latter's campus is now Shenzhen Middle School's junior school. In total, its junior and senior campuses cover an area of 107,602 square metres (1,158,220 sq ft). The student-teacher ratio is about 10:1. Zhu Huawei (朱华伟, Zhū Huáwěi) is the current principal.

Shenzhen Middle School has been continuously ranked as the best school in Shenzhen and among the top schools in Guangdong Province. Over the last two years, Shenzhen Middle School has been ranked #1 in the percentage and number of high-scoring students in Guangdong Province, with the largest number of graduates admitted by top Chinese universities every year. In a 2016 ranking of Chinese high schools that send students to study in US universities, Shenzhen Middle School ranked number 8 in mainland China in terms of the number of students entering top American universities.

Shenzhen Middle School consists of primary, junior and senior schools, located on separate campuses. The senior campus is divided into East Campus, where 10th and 11th graders are located, and West Campus, where 12th graders under intensive preparations for the National Higher Education Entrance Examination are located.

In the three campuses, only the senior campus offers student dorms, which allows Shenzhen Middle School students to choose whether they want to be commuters or residents on campus. The residential facilities available include two residential halls, two dining halls, and two grocery stores. Both junior and senior campuses have a soccer field and a track field. There are five basketball courts, including one indoor, badminton courts and table tennis tables, a taekwondo room and a dancing room.

== History ==
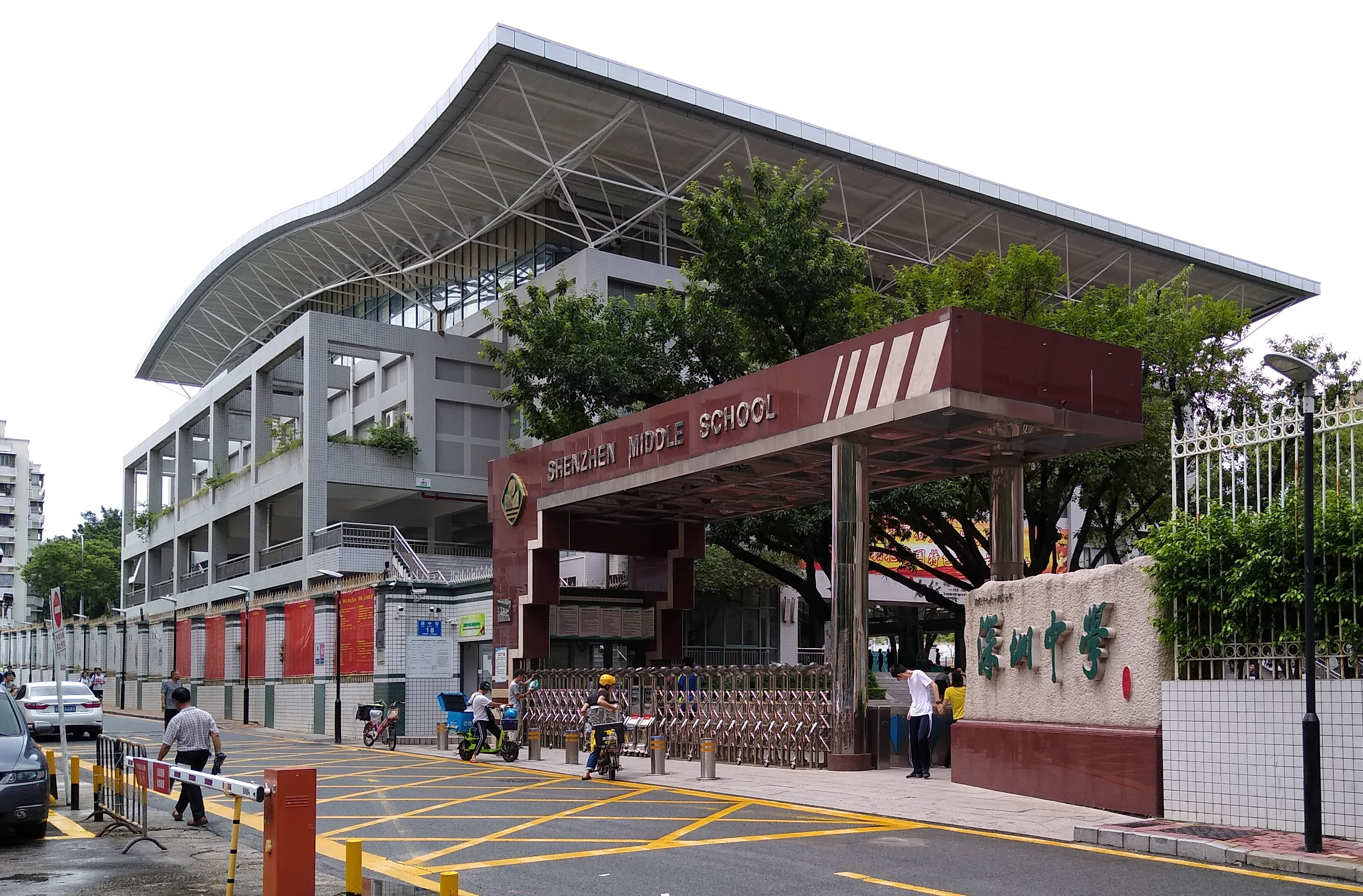
Shenzhen Middle School

In 1947, the Zhang family in Shuibei, Xiangxi, along with the Hubei Villages in Baoan County, Guangdong Province, raised the funds to establish a junior high school. Four people were elected by every village to form a board of directors which filed the application to the Baoan County government. In July 1948, Guangdong Province Department of Education granted the registration of the school. In September 1948, Shenzhen Junior High School was officially founded, located on 10 Yangsheng St Alley 4 near the old county hall. In November 1949, after the establishment of The People's Republic of China, Baoan County People's Government took over Shenzhen Junior High School, and changed its name to the Baoan County Second Junior High School. At that time, the school's facility contained a two-story building, an auditorium downstairs, and a patio. In September 1955, Baoan County Second Junior High School changed its name to Baoan Middle School and became a key middle school in Baoan county. In the same year, it started its high school division. In June 1983, after the authorization of Guangdong Provincial government, Shenzhen Middle School became the Provincial Key High School of Guangdong Province. Honghu Middle School was then merged in Shenzhen Middle School on June 22, 1998.

In 2002, Wang Zheng, the Vice President of the Affiliated High School of Peking University and the President of its division in Nanshan, Shenzhen was assigned the presidency of Shenzhen Middle School. The same year, Shenzhen Middle School started its exploration of educational and curricular reform. Starting from September 2003, Shenzhen Middle School attempted to separate instructive classes and form classes, and canceled its form class system and form instructor system, replacing them with a tutorial system. Students' rights and autonomy were also greatly enhanced. The Student Union was defined as a student self-governance organization. At its peak, more than a third of the student body were members of the Student Union.

The reforms instituted by Wang Zheng caused widespread controversies. Some teachers criticized that his reform irresponsibly allowed for too much space for the students; some parents thought that the reform measures negatively influenced students' performance in the National Higher Education Entrance Examination. On the other hand, some of the graduates thought that the educational model after the reform made them realize their rights and responsibilities as citizens, and was their enlightenment of civic awareness as a member of the civil society. The educational industry and society have also seen Wang's reform as an experiment with civic education.

In April 2010, Wang returned to the Affiliated High School of Peking University to serve as its President. The same year, Wang Zhanbao took over as the new president of Shenzhen Middle School. After assuming his post, he instituted a series of reforms under the slogan "Strive for Academic Excellence. Cultivate a Creative Student Body." He restored the form instructor and form class systems and reduced the number of courses requiring students to go to different classrooms. Initially, his reforms were criticized as "the revival of examination-only education". Meanwhile, Shenzhen Middle School's national key universities admissions rate in Gaokao increased.

On February 19, 2016, because of health concerns, Wang Zhanbao resigned from the post of President. The President of Shenzhen Second Experimental School, Zhao Li, took the post of the presidency.

On January 17, 2017, because Zhao Li was appointed the Vice-Director of Shenzhen Department of Education in November 2016, Zhu Huawei, former Dean of Guangzhou Education Research Institute, became Shenzhen Middle School's President.

On October 21, 2017, a fire occurred on the second floor of the West Campus Dining Hall. Student-run media Nirvana News reported on the news of the fire. It's said that after the event, some administrators pressured the parents of the editors of the Nirvana News, demanding the deletion of the report. The event led to widespread attention and discussion among Shenzhen Middle School's students and alumni.

== Curriculum ==
Shenzhen Middle School offers four curricula to high school students and one curriculum to middle school students. High school students submit their curriculum preferences before the start of their freshman year. All curricula require entrance exams except the Standard Curriculum. For the school year of 2011-2012, the Experimental Curriculum and the Honor Curriculum required a written entrance exam, and the International Curriculum required both a written entrance exam and an interview. Students who do not submit any preference or students who indicate their preferences to these three curricula but fail to pass their written exams and/or interviews are automatically admitted by the Standard Curriculum.

=== Standard Curriculum ===
The Standard Curriculum (标准体系) prepares high school students specifically for the National Higher Education Entrance Examination, a prerequisite for entrance into underground-level education institutions in the form of academic examinations. The Standard Curriculum comprises about 40% of students in Shenzhen Middle School.

=== Experimental Curriculum ===
The Experimental Curriculum (实验体系), with two concentrations, provides students with specialized courses that are normally not available to high school students in China. The Experimental Curriculum comprises about 30% of students in SMS.

==== "Gaokao" Concentration ====
The "Gaokao" Concentration of the Experimental Curriculum (实验体系高考方向) is a program designed for students who are interested in both participating in the National Higher Education Entrance Examination (the Gaokao), and exploring different courses and pedagogical options offered by SMS's Experimental Curriculum.

==== International Concentration (Previously the International Curriculum) ====
The International Concentration of the Experimental Curriculum (实验体系出国方向), or the Advanced Placement Program (APP), is a program for students who plan to study abroad, usually in the United States. Students in this concentration comprise about 18% percent of students in Shenzhen Middle School. Previously called the International Curriculum (commonly referred to as IC), this concentration was renamed and placed under the administration of the Experimental Curriculum in the 2016-2017 school year.

This curriculum is distinguished by offering a liberal arts and science curriculum that emphasizes critical thinking and creativity. Such courses are usually taught in English by Western instructors and are taught at collegiate-level rigor. In the 2013-2014 school year, over 30 college-level courses are offered in addition to college prep courses, including courses in the English language arts, the humanities and social sciences, art, and drama along with math and hard sciences. By taking these courses, students have an extremely high practical level of English in thinking, expression and social interaction. The IC also has a certified college counselor on staff to ensure compliance with US policies and procedures for college application and admission.

In addition, starting from the 2020-2021 school year, the International Concentration began offering the A-Level Program, designed to better prepare students for admission into top UK universities. This program is a response to the increasing demand of students who are more willing to pursue higher education in the UK because of its shorter course (3 years in England instead of 4 years in the US), more affordable tuition, and deterred by the unstable Sino-US relationship under Trump administration. Previously, students could, and still can, apply to UK universities using US standardized test scores, such as SAT, ACT, TOEFL, AP, etc., but due to the differences between the US and UK education system, the results have not been excellent. The effectiveness of the A-Level Program remains to be seen, as it has yet to graduate it first class of students, which is due in 2023.

There has been a misconception that students in IC are required to pay a higher tuition fee than other students in Shenzhen Middle School. Admittedly, IC students occasionally need to buy foreign textbooks, which are more expensive in most cases. Nevertheless, the tuition they pay is the same as that paid by any other students in Shenzhen Middle School and in any public high school in Shenzhen.

=== Honor Curriculum ===
The Honor Curriculum (荣誉体系) is distinguished by students participation in Olympiad academic contests on subjects including mathematics, physics, chemistry, biology, and informatics. The Honor Curriculum comprises about 20% of students in SMS.

Since the Honor Curriculum was established, students have won many provincial, national and international academic awards and honors. Each year, some outstanding Honor Curriculum students are directly admitted by universities in China without taking the National Higher Education Entrance Examination. Some other excellent students may be qualified to receive "score plus" in the National Higher Education Entrance Examination and are therefore able to be admitted into any universities with scores lower than that normally required.

The school year of 2011-12 saw a major change in the Honor Curriculum. A new class was established to host students who demonstrate an excellent command of languages, humanities, or social sciences. Newly enrolled students take an entrance exam to be admitted into this class.

=== Integral Curriculum ===
The Integral Curriculum (整体体系), also called 3+2, is an unofficial course curriculum distinguished by including both junior and senior high school students. The students who enroll in this curriculum in 7th grade are ensured to enter the high school of Shenzhen Middle School.

The Integral Curriculum provides the students with advanced courses in senior high school, including mathematics, physics, and chemistry competition. It is where gifted students start their academic careers.

== Rankings ==
In a 2016 ranking of Chinese high schools that send students to study in American universities, the school ranked eight in mainland China in terms of the number of students entering top American universities.

== Student Achievements ==
=== Academic Competitions ===
Starting from the 1990s, Shenzhen Middle School began encouraging students to participate in various academic competitions, including math, physics, chemistry, biology, computer science, astronomy, and other subjects. After Wang Zheng became the school president, he supported student participation of those academic contests and recruited instructors to provide instruction. After that, almost every year, there are students from Shenzhen Middle School to represent China in international academic competitions. After Wang Zhanbao became the President, he set up the Honor Curriculum, standardized and incorporated the training for International Olympiads into Shenzhen Middle School's elective curriculum, and granted credits for students participating in those competitions according to "Shenzhen Middle School High-end Academic Activities Management Regulations."

Every year, over 10 students from Shenzhen Middle School are granted prioritized admissions by Peking University, Tsinghua University, and University of Science and Technology of China.

Year	Subject	Name	Prize	Coach
1998	Math	Han Jiarui	Gold Medalist, 39th International Mathematical Olympiad	Shang Qiang, Guo Shenghong
2004	Chemistry	Xue Mingyu	Gold Medalist, 36th International Chemistry Olympiad	Yang Ping
2006	Math	Kang Jiayin	Gold Medalist, 37th International Mathematical Olympiad	Zhang Chengyu
2006	Chemistry	Zeng Yi	Gold Medalist, 38th International Chemistry Olympiad	Yang Ping
2007	Physics	Jian Chaoming	Gold Medalist, 38th International Physics Olympiad	Yao Xuelin, Xiong Xinjia
2007	Math	Wang Xuan	Gold Medalist, 48th International Mathematical Olympiad	Zhang Chengyu
2009	Physics	Xiong Zhaoxi	Gold Medalist, 40th International Physics Olympiad	Yao Xuelin, Xiong Xinjia
2009	Chemistry	Huang Xinchen	Gold Medalist, 41st International Chemistry Olympiad	Wang Jinyang
2012	Physics	Lin Haoda	Gold Medalist, 43rd International Physics Olympiad	Yao Xuelin, Wu Changjiang
2012	Chemistry	Fu Tianren	Gold Medalist, 44th International Chemistry Olympiad	Wang Jinyang
2014	Math	Zhou Yunkun	Gold Medalist, 55th International Mathematical Olympiad	Yao Liang, Zhang Chengyu

== Campus media ==
=== Radio Station ===
The radio station named Fenghuazijin (风华子衿广播站) is an official on-campus broadcast station of Shenzhen Middle School. It mainly broadcasts news, literature, music, and critiques written by members of the radio station, with over two thousand listeners.

=== ACES Studio ===
The ACES Studio, which is as known as the "Shenzhen Middle School Campus Television(深圳中学校园电视台)", is a semi-official organization that focuses on making videos related to the school. They often cooperate with the school administration to record various activities held in SMS.

=== Nova Monthly ===
Nova Monthly is a bilingual school magazine published monthly in English and Chinese. It focuses on translating thought-provoking articles in American and English publications into Chinese. As a cultural ambassador, it aims to highlight the wisdom and sparkling ideas of oversea countries and build a bridge connecting the West and East. Nova Monthly contains 5 interdisciplinary columns: "Living", "Sports", "Entertainment", "Technology," and "Column X".

Nova Monthly no longer exist in Shenzhen Middle School now.

=== Nirvana News ===
Nirvana News (涅槃新闻) was an independent campus news outlet established and run exclusively by students. It reported on various campus events, and aimed to provide an impartial and objective portrait of campus affairs in Shenzhen Middle School.

Nirvana News had emerged from Nirvana Weekly (涅槃周刊), which was a comprehensive Chinese magazine first published by Shenzhen Middle School students in November 2009. Being an unaffiliated and non-profit magazine, Nirvana Weekly aimed to deliver intramural and extramural information with fine quality, spread contemporary citizen ideals, and solicit consideration and discussion among its readers. The magazine's motto was "Through the darkest dark, may we see the light. (越万里之溟濛兮，见凤之流光)" In a report published in June 2011, it was dubbed the most daring publication in China, and that most of the mainstream publications couldn't match its outspokenness.

However, due to its mismanagement, the Nirvana News was ordered to dissolve by the Council of Association Union that is in charge of association affairs in 2023.

=== Visionary Monthly ===
Visionary Monthly is an English-only school magazine. It is the first English-only media within Shenzhen Middle School, which is completely written, edited, and published by middle school students in SMS. Its influence spreads beyond campus, as it has buyers all over Shenzhen and more than three hundred subscriptions. Most of the articles in the magazine are novels, proses, music criticism, and political criticism.

Visionary Monthly no longer exist in Shenzhen Middle School now.

=== Shenzhong Daily ===
Shenzhong Daily is a daily on-campus newspaper publication. It began its publications in 2009, and is free to all the faculty and students of Shenzhen Middle School.

Shenzhong Daily no longer exist in Shenzhen Middle School now.

== Associations ==
There are more than 100 associations in Shenzhen Middle School.

There are two kinds of associations in Shenzhen Middle School: school-class students' associations and students' associations. School-class students' associations are found and led by the school for multiple purposes such as managing students' associations. Students' associations are found by students, and they are managed by Council of Association Union, which is the school-class associations found to manage them.

=== Shenzhen Middle School Council of Association Union ===
Shenzhen Middle School Council of Association Union
- 深圳中学社团联盟理事会
- Abbreviation: SMSCAU
- Nickname: 社联
- Type: School-Class Students' Association
- Legal status: Organization
- Purpose: Serving and Managing Associations
- Headquarters: Shenzhen Middle School Nigang Capmus
- Location: Shenzhen, China
- Official language: Chinese
- Secretary General: Yu Gu, Jinhao Guo (2023) Sihan Chen, Zikang Shu (2024)
- Parent organization: Shenzhen Middle School Youth League Committee

==== Summarize ====
Shenzhen Middle School Council of Association Union is a school-class students' association in charge of association management.

==== Departments ====
There are three departments in the council: the Conference Department, the Liaison Department, and the Technology and Promotion Department. The Conference Department prepares every meeting held by the council. The Liaison Department communicates with teachers and leaders of different organizations. The Technology and Promotion Department manages the equipments provided for association and post advertising materials.

==== Leaders ====
The council is equipped with two General Secretaries as the leaders of the organization. And each department in the council has one Minister and Vice Minister.

==== Events ====
The Council of Association Union manages associations, and help them develop. The council also provides students with platforms to get a better understanding of various associations in Shenzhen Middle School. The Association Recruitment Conference, the Month of Associations and the Top 10 Club Selection Conference are the three most celebrated events held by the council yearly. The council also holds meetings of leaders of associations and other routine activities to serve the association and form a better atmosphere for associations to develop.

=== Shenzhen Middle School Student Activity Association ===
Shenzhen Middle School Student Activity Association is a school-class student-run organization aimed towards organizing high-quality student activities and providing technical support for routine activities in the school. Its biggest activities include the Shenzhen Middle School's Top Ten Singers Competition, and the annual New Year Fete.

=== Shenzhen Middle School Model United Nations ===
Shenzhen Middle School Model United Nations is the organizer of Pan-Pearl River Delta Model United Nation Conference For High School Students (PPRDMUN), the largest and most weighty MUN conference in Southern China.

=== Shenzhen Middle School Science Association ===
Shenzhen Middle School Science Association is a club where students communicate with others on scientific issues. There're five academic divisions so far - the Mathematics, Physics, Chemistry, Biology, and Computer Science.

The Shenzhen Middle SchoolScience Association provides its members with high-qualified academic courses, where deeper level knowledge is offered.

=== Shenzhen Middle School Science Fiction Institute (SMSSFI) ===
Shenzhen Middle School Science Fiction Institute is a students' association found to connect students with the same interest in the field of science fiction.

Science fiction screening event, science fiction sharing activities and other activities related to science fiction were usually held by SFI.

==== The First SFI (SFI I) ====
A science fiction association called Sifi Science Fiction Institute was found by Liu Yu in 2021.

In the summary part of the yearly audit 2022, Liu said: "Our Sci-Fi Science Fiction Institute was established around November, so strictly speaking, it has only been developing for a little over half a year. As a newly born club, we are facing a severe shortage of manpower, and there was no such club before for us to learn from, so we are also facing a lack of inspiration in terms of club activities. At the same time, the pandemic has hindered our progress, with online classes lasting for a long time before we returned to school, which meant that our club activities had almost no time to be carried out. However, overall, we have preliminarily established the high-level structure and division of labor of our science fiction club, which can maintain normal operation, and club activities have been conducted, roughly clarifying the mode of holding club classes.In summary, we are steadily improving and can now stand firm."

However, due to the impact of the COVID, SFI I had trouble recruit new members, and was ordered to dissolve by the Council of Association Union after it failed to pass the yearly audit in 2023.

==== The Second SFI (SFI II) ====
Another science fiction related association was found in 2023, but it never really worked as an association. It as ordered to dissolve by the Council of Association Union after it failed to pass the yearly audit in 2024.

==== The Third SFI (SFI III) ====
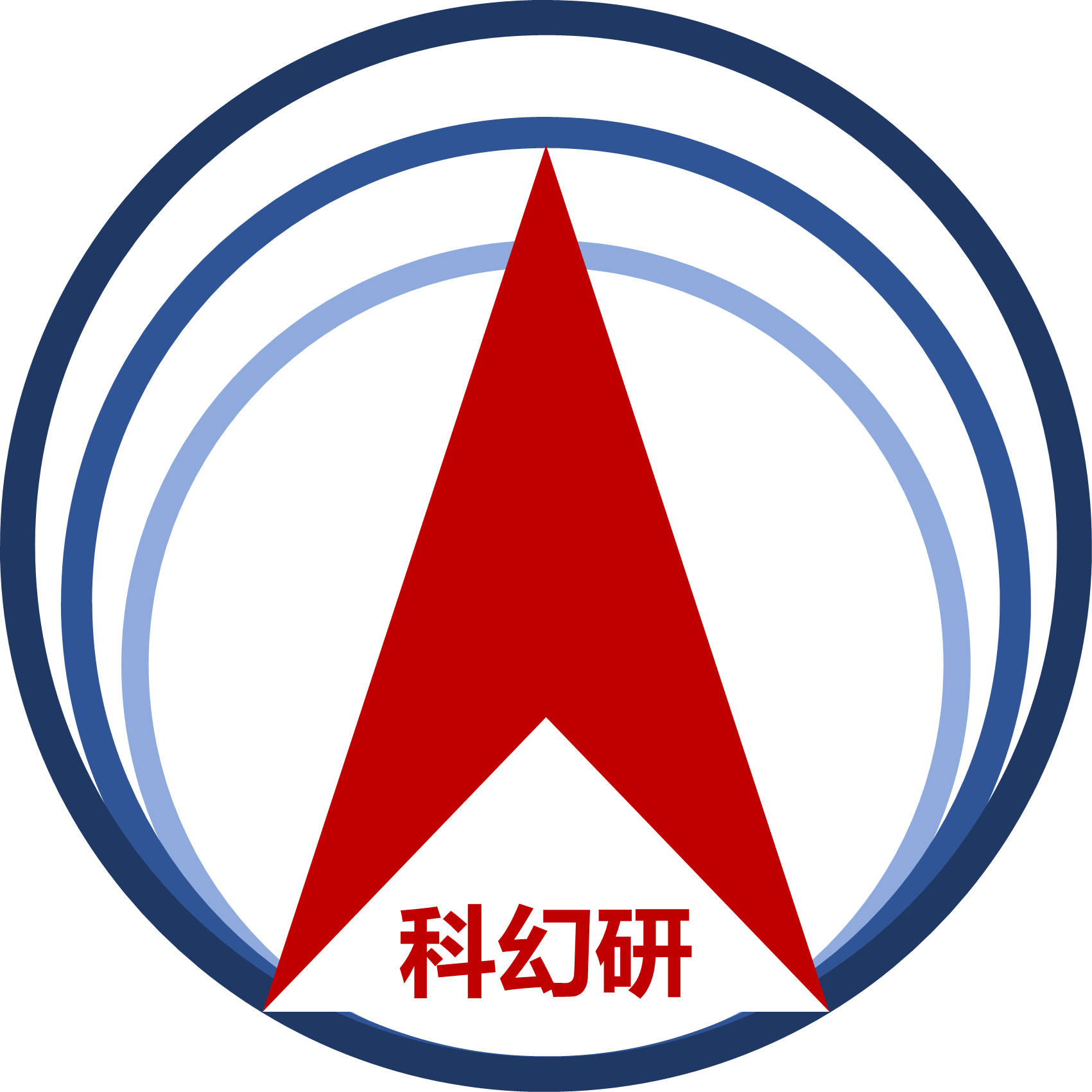
The main logo of Shenzhen Middle School Science Fiction Institute

In 2024, a group of students founded another science fiction association. In memory of the first SFI in SMS, they used the name Shenzhen Middle School Science Fiction Institute as the name of their association too.

The current Shenzhen Middle School Science Fiction Institute was founded in 2024, after the approval given by the Shenzhen Middle School Council of Association Union.

The Shenzhen Middle School Science Fiction Institute (SMSSFI) is a student organization dedicated to exploring realms of science fiction through literary creation, critical discussion, and interdisciplinary activities.

The SMSSFI organizes classes, interviews and other forms of activities routinely.

=== Torchlight ===
Torchlight is a club which provides its members with a place to communicate with each other. It is mainly used for discussions about politics.

== Notable alumni ==
- Ma Huateng, Chairman of Tencent Holdings Limited
- Chen Yidan, co-founder and former CAO of Tencent Holdings Limited
- Han Jiarui, Gold Medalist in the 38th International Mathematical Olympiad
- Mingyu Xue, Gold Medalist in the 36th International Chemistry Olympiad
- Jiayin Kang, Gold Medalist in the 46th International Math Olympiad
- Zeng Yi, Gold Medalist in the 38th International Chemistry Olympiad
- Chaoming Jiani, Gold Medalist in the 38th International Physics Olympiad
- Luo Yuhao, Fashion Designer of Nicole Farhi

== Media citations ==
- SZ Middle School partners with German institute
- Mission San Jose High School Delegation visited Shenzhen Middle School in April 2007
