= Chotrana =

- Town
- Chotrana
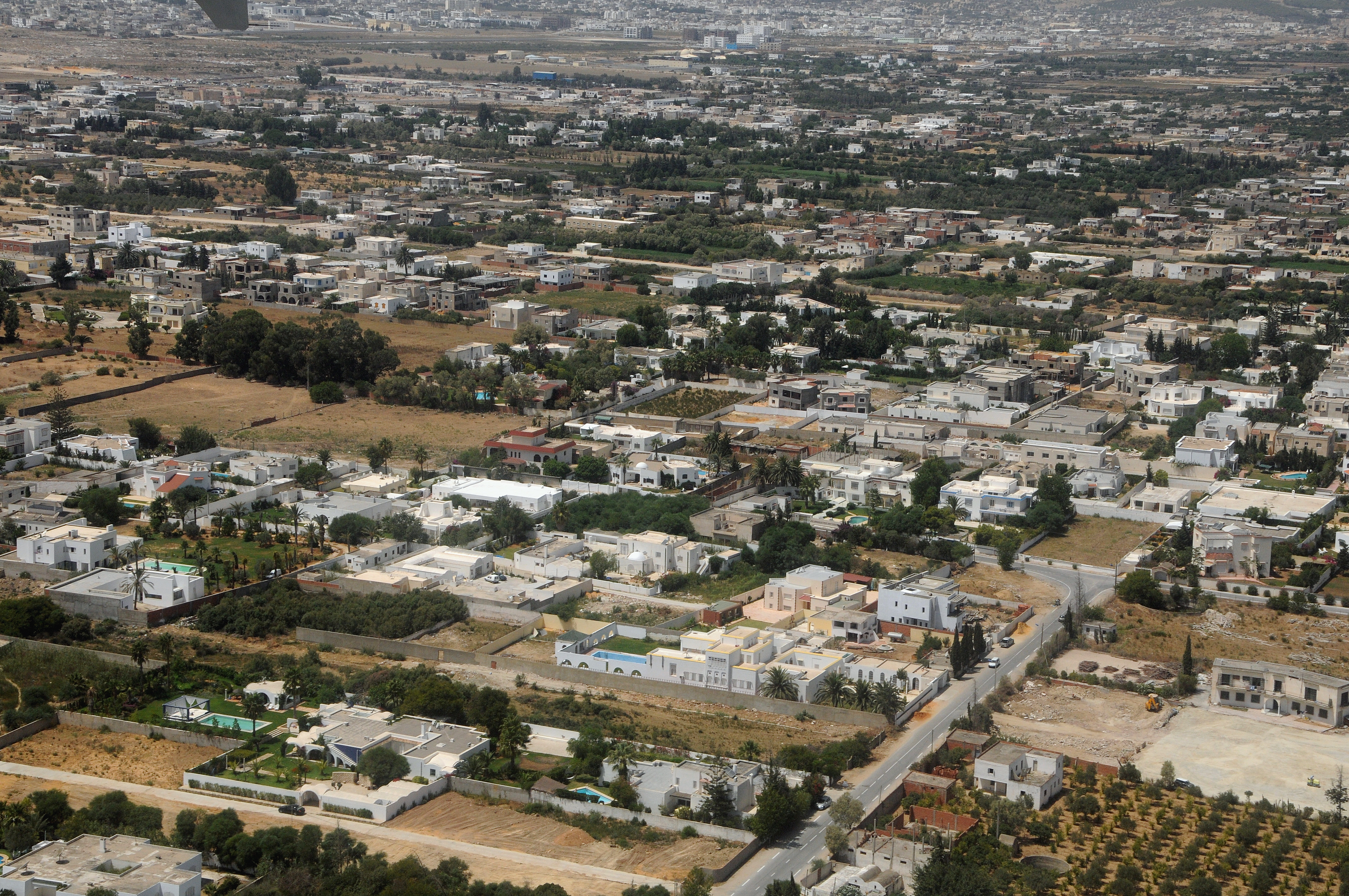
- aerial view Chotrana - August 6, 2010
- Interactive map of Chotrana
- Coordinates: 36°53′46″N 10°13′03″E
- Country: Tunisia
- Governorate: Ariana Governorate
- Time zone: UTC+1

Chotrana (Arabic: شطرانة), is a Tunisian village dependent on the municipality of La Soukra, in the governorate of Arianah.

== History ==
From the end of the 1970s, new inhabitants settled there from various regions of the country. Chotrana also has many emigrants who have built a second home in which they stay during the summer or after retirement. P.O Box of Chotrana

== See also ==
- La Soukra
- Ariana
