= Pioneer School of Ariana =

Coordinates: 36°51′06″N 10°11′15″E

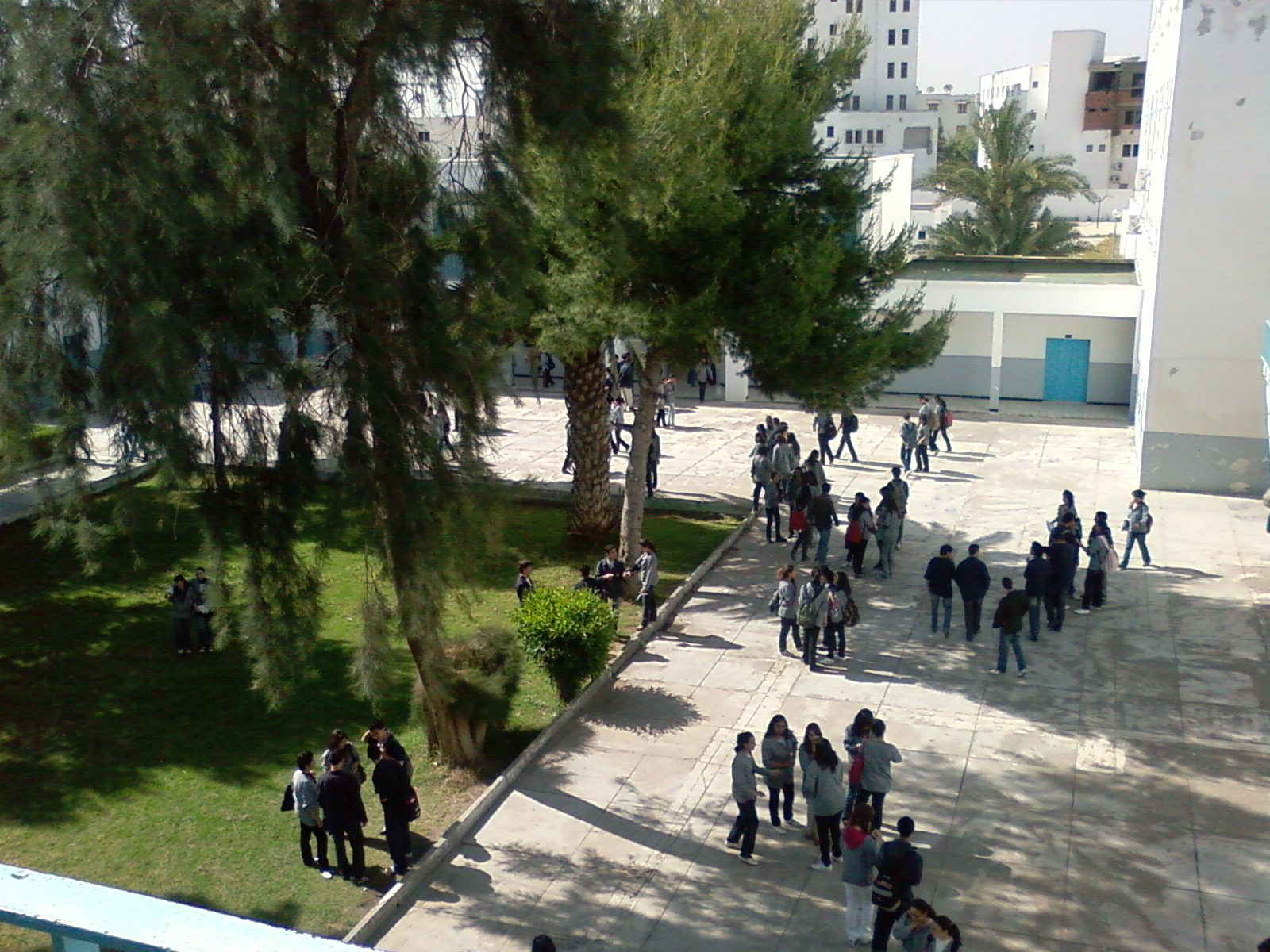
The school's courtyard

The Pioneer School of Ariana (French: Lycée Pilote de l'Ariana; Arabic: المعهد النّمـــوذجــي بأريـــانـة), commonly known as LPA, is a secondary school located in "l'Avenue de l'Indépendance" in Ariana, Tunisia.

It is one of the most prestigious schools in Tunisia, known for its high quality education and its highly competitive environment : it enjoys a success rate of 100% at the Baccalaureate exam. In 2018 it was ranked 1st regionally and 1st nationally .

== History ==
The school was founded on September 15, 1983, in the context of a policy aiming at uniting the elites in special schools. First, scientific subjects were taught in English but French soon substituted it, as is the case in the other Tunisian schools. Students used to get in at the age of twelve. At the time, the school had 7 different grades. But following educational reforms, the secondary education has been split into two parts, and students enter this school at the age 15, after achieving grades among the highest in the national 9th grade examination. This is the fact that makes it an elite school.

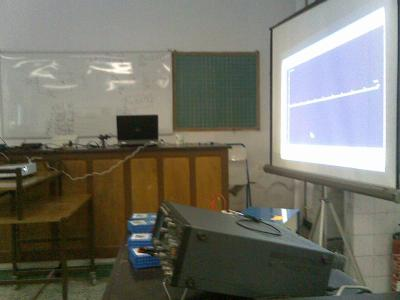
Laboratoire de physique

== Principals ==
To this day, the school has had nine principals:

- 1983-1989 : Habiba Soua
- 1989-2000 : Néjib Zaatour
- 2000-2008 : Hassen Zaghdidi
- 2008-2011 : Mondher Sghairi
- 2011-2011 : Saima Néji Ben Brahim
- 2011- 2012 : Ahmed Oueslati
- nov. 2012-April 2013 : Zouhaier Idoudi
- sept. 2013-sept. 2018 : Naïma Lajnef Bouafif
- sept. 2018-dec. 2024 : Farhat Hmidi
- dec. 2024-present : Rym Omar
