= La Soukra =

Commune in Ariana Governorate, Tunisia

La Soukra سكرة
- Commune and town
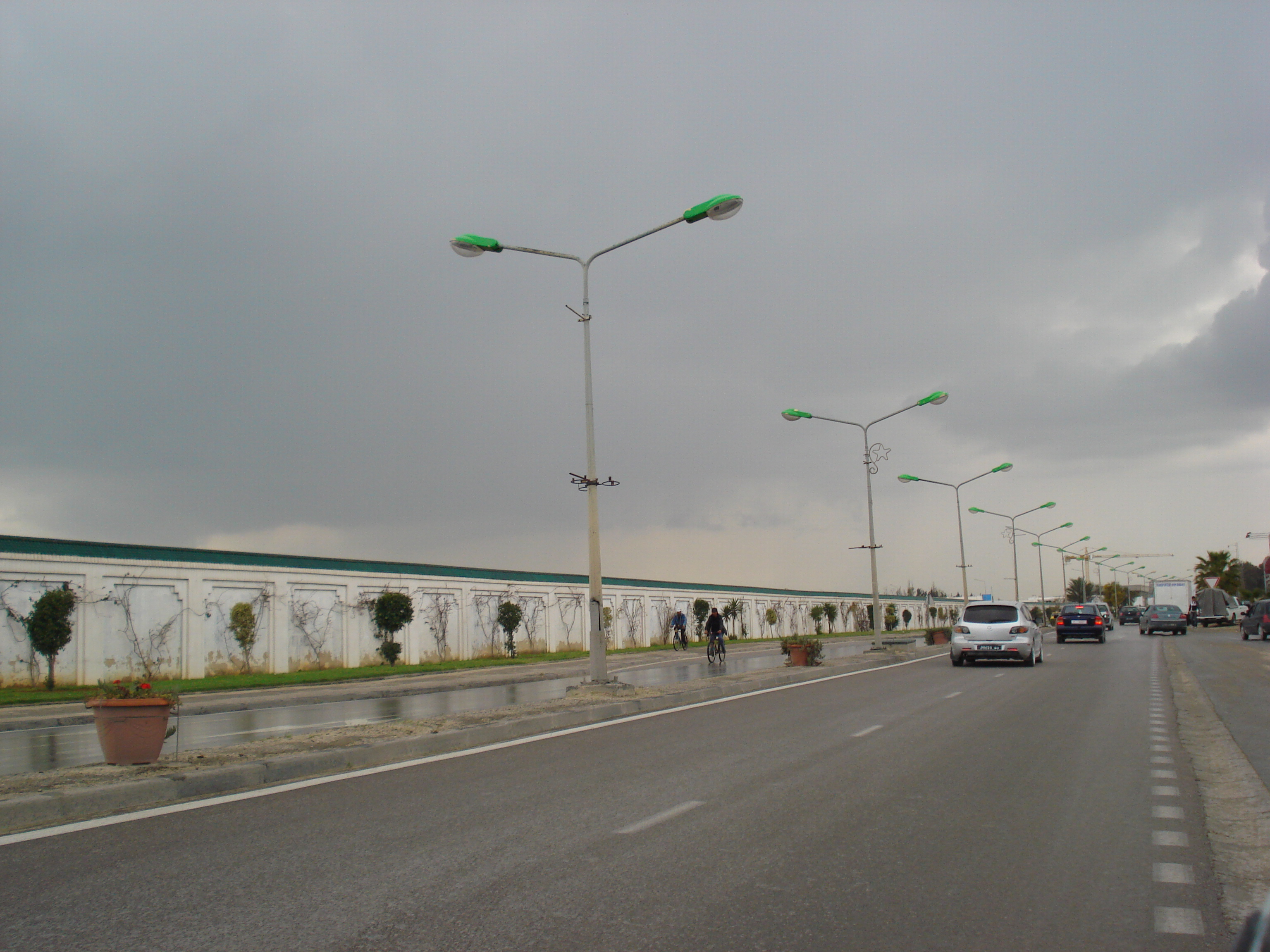
- Soukra road (RN10) in La Soukra

- Location within Tunisia
- Coordinates: 36°53′N 10°15′E
- Country: Tunisia
- Governorate: Ariana Governorate

Population (2024)
  - Total: 159,862
- Time zone: UTC+1 (CET)
- Postal code: 2036
- Area code: +216 71

La Soukra (سكرة) is a town and commune in the Ariana Governorate of Tunisia, forming part of the northern suburbs of Greater Tunis. At the 2024 census, it had a population of 159,862. The town occupies a plain historically known for its orchards, and its population grew by nearly 80% between the 2004 and 2024 censuses.

== History ==
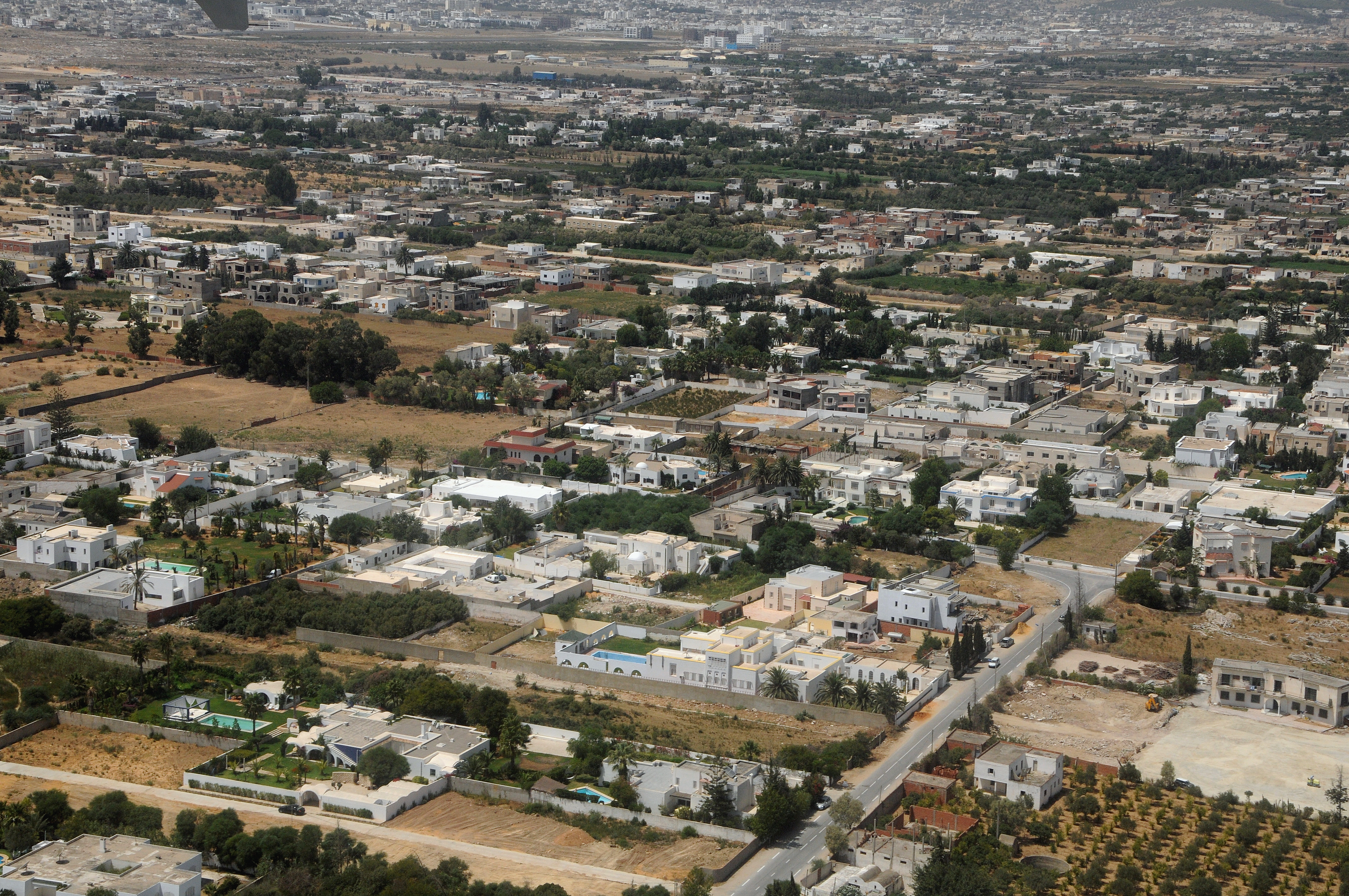
Aerial view of the Chotrana sector in La Soukra

Historically, La Soukra was an agricultural area of orchards and gardens on the northern outskirts of Tunis, where aristocratic families of Andalusian origin built country houses. The 'Boukhobza' blood orange, a seedling selection of the Tunisian 'Maltaise sanguine', originated in the Jardin Boukhobza in La Soukra. Under the French protectorate, the Golf de Carthage was founded in La Soukra in 1927. The population of the commune grew from 89,151 at the 2004 census to 129,693 in 2014 and 159,862 in 2024.

== Geography and administrative divisions ==
La Soukra lies about 10 kilometres (6.2 mi) north-east of central Tunis and a few kilometres north-east of Tunis–Carthage International Airport. It is divided into seven imadats (sectors). At the 2024 census, the most populous were Ennasim (34,219) and Dar Fadhal (28,155). Between the 2014 and 2024 censuses, the largest percentage increases were in El Bessatine (91%), Soukra (62%) and Chotrana (55%), while Ettaamir was the only sector to lose population.

Population of the imadats of La Soukra
Imadat	Arabic name	2004	2014	2024
Ennasim	النسيم	22,803	31,768	34,219
Dar Fadhal	دار فضال	15,558	23,340	28,155
Soukra	سكرة	11,349	16,499	26,744
Ettaamir	التعمير	16,789	26,834	25,102
Chotrana	شطرانة	7,126	10,594	16,454
Borj Louzir	برج الوزير	10,846	13,440	15,406
El Bessatine	البساتين	4,680	7,218	13,782
Total		89,151	129,693	159,862

== Government ==
La Soukra is one of the seven delegations of Ariana Governorate. In April 2019, twenty members of the municipal council resigned, which a council spokesman attributed to the council president's individual style of management. Municipal councils across Tunisia were dissolved by decree-law in March 2023, and La Soukra was allotted seven seats on its local council in the 2023 elections that followed.

== Economy and transport ==
The Le Square shopping centre on Avenue de l'UMA includes a Monoprix store, which opened in February 2016, and a store of the Zen group, which opened in December 2015.

National Route 10 (RN10) serves La Soukra. A link between the X road and RN10, opened in May 2021, connects the Charguia I zone with the Soukra area. Transtu buses, including lines 47 and 18C, serve the town.

== Sport and recreation ==
The Golf de Carthage (also known as the Carthage Golf Course) is an 18-hole course founded in 1927 and renovated in 1991, with fairways running among eucalyptus trees. The renovation was carried out by the French architect Yves Bureau. According to Bunkered magazine, it is the oldest golf course in Tunisia.

The National Equestrian Centre of Soukra was established in 2000 on state-owned land of more than eight hectares and served as the base of the Tunisian equestrian sports federation until 2011. The first edition of an international show-jumping competition, the Grand Prix de la Soukra, was scheduled for 23–26 April 2015 at the equestrian section of the sports club of the police intervention units in La Soukra.

Soukra Park is an amusement park.

== Education ==
The British International School of Tunis, a co-educational day school for students aged 3 to 18, is located in La Soukra.

== See also ==
- List of cities in Tunisia
