= Lycée Pierre Mendès France (Tunisia) =

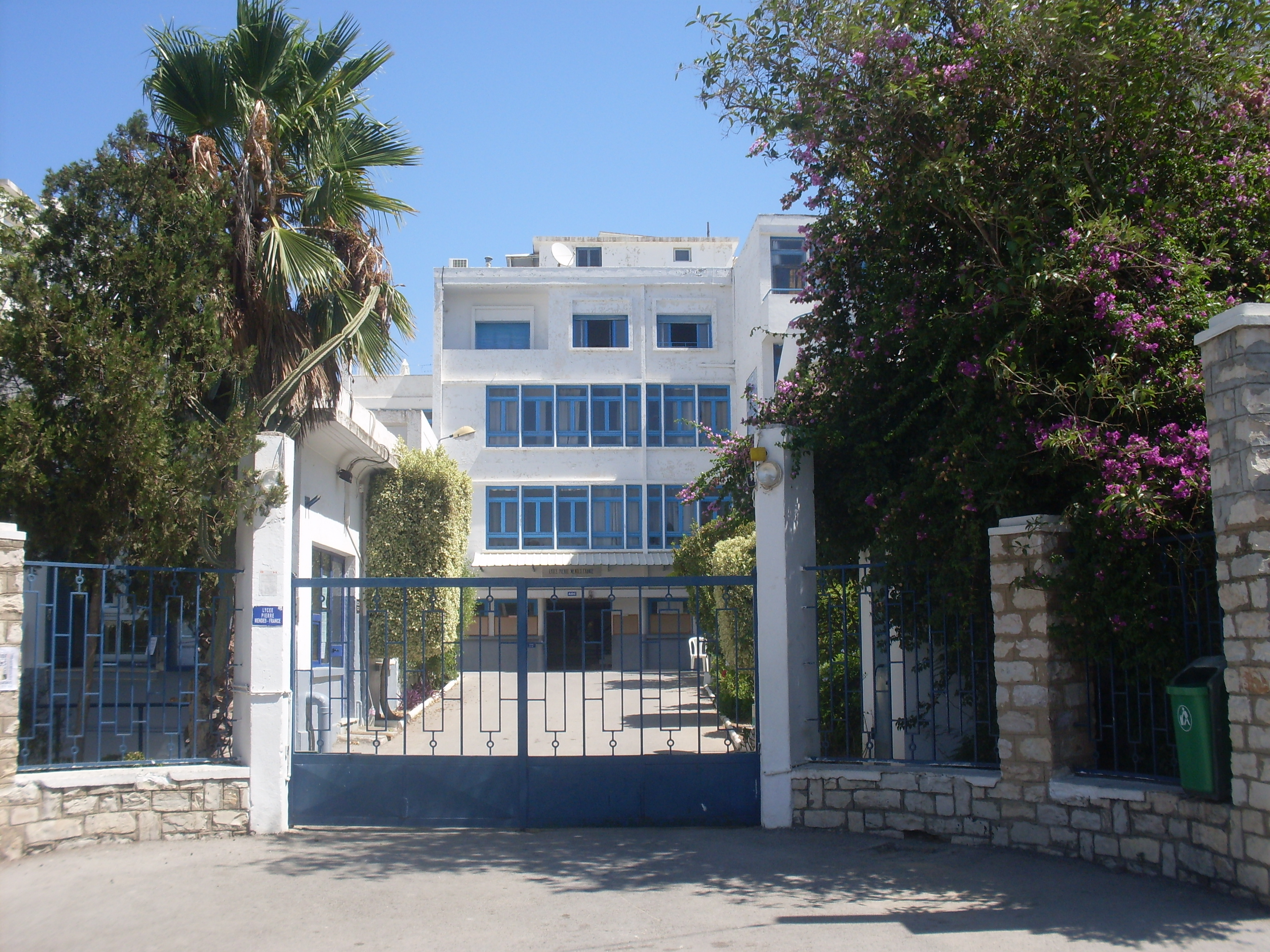
- Main entrance gate

Address
- 9 rue Pierre Mendes France – B.P. 125 – 1082 Tunis El Mahrajene – Tunisie; Mutuelleville, Tunis; Tunisia
- Coordinates: 36°50′01.54″N 10°10′31.07″E

Information
- Type: Private lycée (high school)
- Founded: 1956; 69 years ago
- Language: French
- Website: ert.tn/pmf/

The Lycée Pierre Mendès France is a French private lycée (high school) in Mutuelleville, Tunis, Tunisia. It was founded in 1956 as an annex of the Lycée Carnot of Tunis, and originally named the "Lycée Francais de Mutuelleville." It was renamed in honor of politician Pierre Mendès-France on the occasion of President François Mitterrand's 1983 visit to Tunisia.

President Jacques Chirac visited the school in December, 2003. He caused some controversy when he told the students "Wearing a veil, whether we want it or not, is a sort of aggression that is difficult for us to accept."

It is a part of the Établissement Régional de Tunis (ERT) along with two primary schools, the École Georges Brassens and the École Robert Desnos.
