= Tunisian Baccalaureate =

Educational qualification in Tunisia

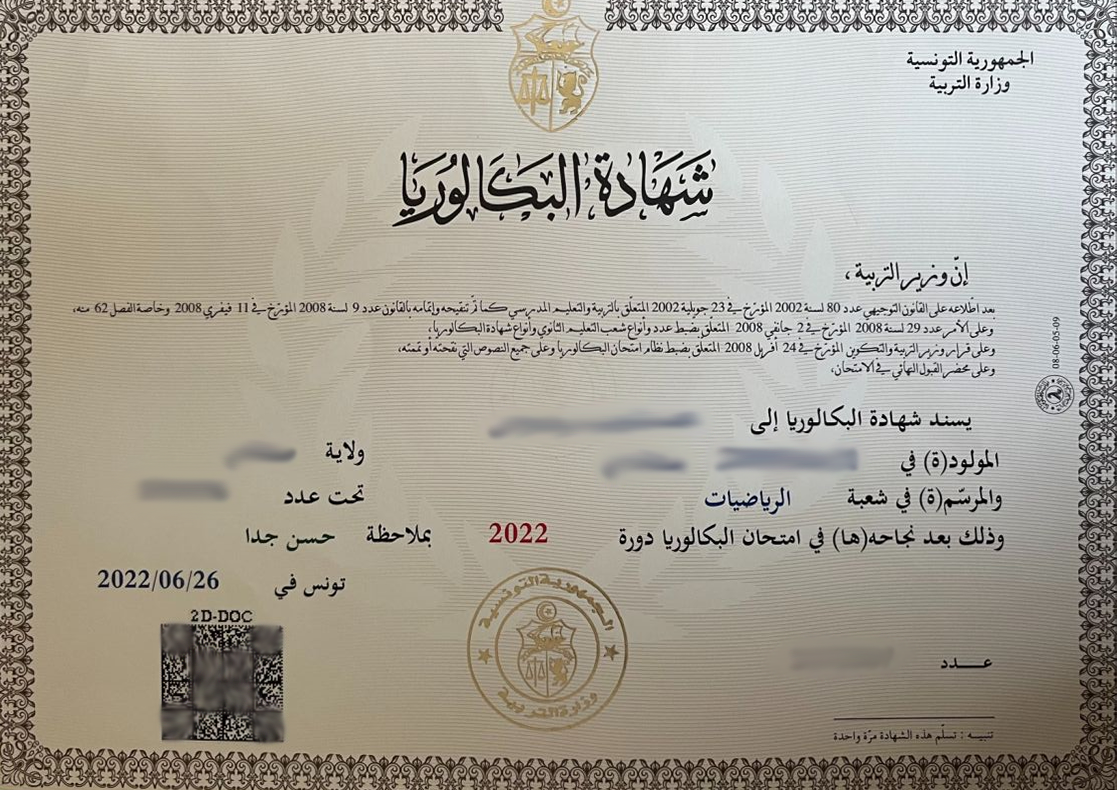
A sample Tunisian Baccalauréat Diploma

The Tunisian Baccalaureate, or Examen National du Baccalauréat, is a standardized test was founded in 1891, a decade after the beginning of the French colonization of Tunisia (1881–1956). Students who successfully complete the baccalaureate are assured a place at a university, but not always to study their chosen subjects. The baccalaureate is both a school leaving and a university entrance examination, and the success rate is lower than for other tests of this type; on average, 60 percent of students who take it do not pass.

After achieving independence from France in 1956, the Tunisian government reviewed the education system, and the Education Reform Law was introduced in 1958.

== General Presentation ==
Even after Tunisian independence, the title and structure of the Tunisian Baccalaureate continued to be based on the French Baccalauréat and to serve its dual function as a school leaving and university entrance examination. While possibly not as intensive as the French Baccalauréat, in which the written component alone usually involves 17 to 23 hours of testing over a week, the Tunisian version requires examination of its participants in an average of 10 subjects.

Although it was once recognized in some developed countries, it eventually lost its reputation and value in the late 1970s. To give access to job markets or universities, many states now require diplomas, equivalency attestations, degrees, tests, or examinations such as the Cambridge A/AS Level, Cambridge Pre-U, the French Baccalauréat, the United States SAT reasoning test or ACT test. However, pupils who have passed the Tunisian Baccalaureate can continue their studies at some colleges in France and Quebec.

The principal session takes place each year in early June, and the results are revealed in the fourth week of June. A retest for borderline failures is held in late June, and its results are made known by the first week of July.

== Equivalency ==
Some experts in Education believe that the Tunisian Baccalaureate is comparable to a Grade-12 Certificate, but Tunisians take the exam at 18 years old, when seeking a place at university. A new way to mark the Baccalauréat was created in 2002. It consists of adding 25% of the school-year mark (out of 20) to 75% of the examination mark (out of 20) to obtain a total that is then used for ranking examinees for university places or student orientation. This practice was abolished in 2016 following the new education reform.

== First Session of French Baccalauréat in Tunisia (1899) ==
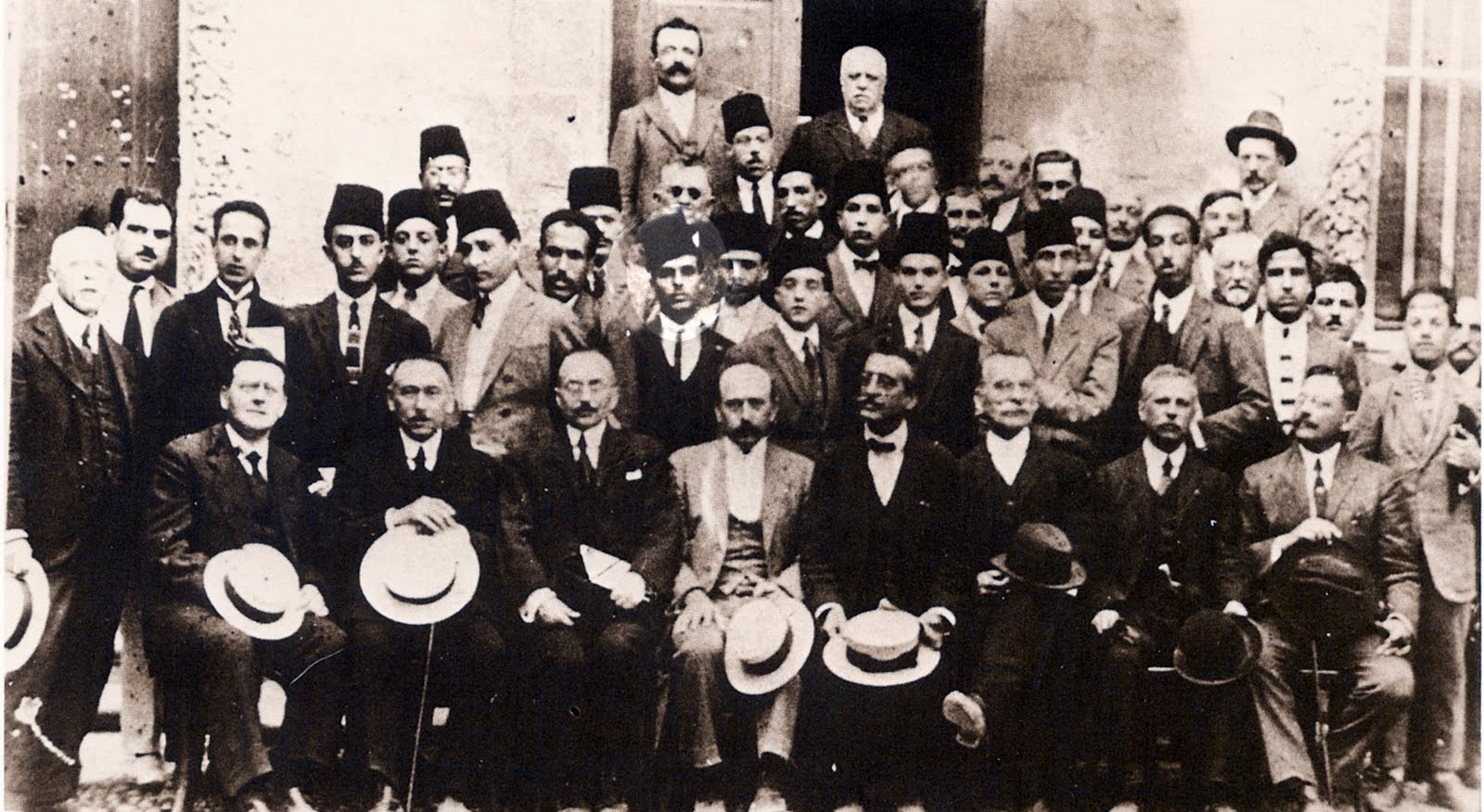
Habib Bourguiba, 1st President of Tunisia, and his classmates in his Baccalaureate Year in 1924 in Sadiki College, Tunis

The first Tunisian Baccalaureate was based on the French version, modified according to the ideas of Jules Ferry. There were fewer than 500 examinees. From 1891 to 1916, only about 120 people took the test – an average of 5 per year for a quarter of a century. In 1927, however, 27 examinees passed the exam, and in 1938 the number had increased to 58. Until the mid-1970s, the Tunisian Baccalaureate had two parts, a Grade 11 Passing Test for the 5th Year of secondary education and a Grade 12 Passing Test for the 6th Year. It was offered in Arabic as well as French. Speaking and Writing were the two primary areas of proficiency examined in all subjects, including mathematics. From 1976 onwards, the Baccalauréat has been offered in a single bilingual French-Arabic version, taken at 19 years of age and when the student is in Grade 12 (plus 1 year of education). It consists of two sessions of written tests in all subjects. There is also a special version for students with special needs.

== First Post-Independence French Baccalauréat (1957) ==
After the French left in 1956, the first Tunisian national Baccalaureate was held on May 31, 1957. It was seen as an opportunity for Tunisian citizens to construct a baccalauréat to meet their own needs and to further the construction of a rejuvenated state There were 1900 examinees, 1400 from the Tunis Governorate and 500 from other parts of the country. Over 600 successfully completed the exam, of whom more than 50 received a Merit grade.

== 1957 Tunisian French Baccalauréat Laureates ==
Men

- Mohamed Khlil
- Heinz Che7li (67 years later)
- Rayen Zanina (FT. lmekla lbnina)
- Nouri Zorgati
- Mohamed Saïem
- Sadok Atallah
- Ahmed Sayyala
- Anouar Jarraya (Sciences)
- Hédi Debbiche
- Mohamed Mohktar Chouikha
- Mongi Fekih (Literature)
- Ezzeddine Chaouch (Philosophy and Literature)
- Mohamed Bouhanek (Technology)
- Mohamed Souissi
- Rachid Ben Ghanem
- Ali Maârref (Mathematics)
- Youssef Ben Salah

Women

- Neila Attia (Literature)
- Khadija Saheb Ettabaâ (Literature)
- Jalila El Hadhri (Literature)
- Aziza Attar (Literature)
- Fatma Mâalli
- Dalila Ben Othman
- Zakia Kaddous
- Hamida Trabelsi

Pass with a little Merit and not Pass with Merit:

- Fadhila Hbaïb
- Dalila Hamdi
- Hassiba Ben Nasser
- Leila Sâada
- Nabiha Idriss
- Hayet Akrout
- Aïcha Amri
- Abla Ben Slama
- Zohra Ellouze

== Specialities ==
The Tunisian Baccalaureat includes seven specialities:

- Mathematics
- Experimental Sciences
- Technology
- Economics
- Computer Science
- Literature
- Sports

== The Examination Record (2020–2024) ==
In 2024, Ramez Msek from Pioneer High School of Sousse and in 2020, Ahmed Kallela from the Pioneer Highschool of Monastir in Monastir, both obtained 20.15 out of 20 in Their Mathematics exam, a record in Tunisia. Ramez and Ahmed surpassed the 20/20 mark because one of the tests that are passed during the bac exam counts as a bonus mark added to the average and is not included directly to the average mark.

In 2010, a success rate of over 50% was recorded in the Principal Session, the highest since 2002. The pass rate in 2011 was 52.33%.
