= American Cooperative School of Tunis =

Location
- Cite Taeib M'hiri BP 150; 2045 Laouina; Tunisia
- Coordinates: 36°51′09″N 10°16′12″E

Information
- School type: Private, Non-Profit, Elementary/Middle/High School
- Established: 1959
- Faculty: 62 teachers, 31 TA's, 11 Administrators
- Grades: Pre-school 3year old-12
- Age: 3+
- Hours in school day: 8:00 AM - 3:00 PM (7 hours)
- Mascot: Falcon
- Accreditation: Middle States Association of Colleges and Schools and CIS
- Tuition: $6,500-$24,470 (depending on Grade Level)
- Affiliation: United States Department of State
- Website: www.acst.net

The American Cooperative School of Tunis or ACST (Arabic: المدرسة التعاونية الأمريكية بتونس) is a comprehensive American, international, non-profit, private school located in El Aouina, Tunisia.

The school enrolls more than 450 students in grades Pre-school-12.

The school is widely known for its International Baccalaureate Diploma Program which it has used since 2000. It is currently the only IB World School in Tunisia.

== History ==
The American Cooperative School of Tunis was founded in 1959, originally as an American Elementary School only teaching Grades PreK-8. A ninth grade was added in 1982 and a tenth grade in 1993. Eleventh and twelfth grades were added in 1995 and 1996, respectively, with the first graduating class being the class of June 1997.

The school's enrolment increased dramatically following the temporary relocation of the African Development Bank from its headquarters in Abidjan, Côte d'Ivoire to Tunis, Tunisia in 2003.

Following attacks on the nearby US Embassy, protesters torched the school building containing the Elementary School Library on September 14, 2012. Fire and smoke damage spread to 12 adjoining classrooms rendering them unsafe. The entire block was condemned. The remainder of the campus was ransacked and looted for several hours, resulting in over $5.5 million in estimated damage.

However, the school commenced within a few days and is now back and flourishing better than ever, thanks to rebuilding efforts from the many countries and persons involved.

== Facilities ==
ACST is located on a 10-acre (40,000 m^{2}) campus with completely new or renovated building dedicated to pre-school, elementary, middle and high school. A three-year expansion project was completed in May 2006 and includes a new elementary playground space with new equipment, an amphitheatre and green space. A new facility in currently in the works and should be finished in 2016/17.

The admin/preschool building contains an elementary library with an amphitheater and elementary computer lab. For the secondary school there are two science labs, two computer labs, two art rooms and the main library with more than 12,000 volumes and a computer research area. Other buildings house a large music classroom, school store, copy center and warehouse.

The school has a full gym/auditorium (with three classrooms), a second newly constructed gym, a cafeteria and a regulation sized grass-covered soccer/softball field with a 300-meter track being renovated this year. An on-campus parking garage for 74 vehicles was constructed last school year. ACST shares use of a newly constructed 25-meter swimming pool located at the nearby United States Embassy to Tunisia.

Bus transportation is available to and from the school from most residential areas of Tunis, La Marsa, Gammarth, El Manar and Tunisia Carthage.

== Secondary school ==
The American Cooperative School of Tunis has American-style high school graduation requirements offering their own "ACST Diploma" in addition to the International Baccalaureate Diploma. The ACST Diploma can be obtained by earning credits. These credits consist of four credits of English, Social Studies, and Mathematics as well as three credits of Science. In addition, two credits of Foreign Language, two credits of Physical Education, one course of Art, Music, Technology, and Health are also required. An additional four credits must be obtained by taking other courses to earn the required total of 24. Earning the International Baccalaureate Diploma constitutes automatic fulfilment of the ACST Diploma requirements.

=== Initial years ===
The initial years of the ACST high school also known as grades 9 and 10 or Freshman and Sophomore years consist of American style high school courses designed for 14- to 16-year-olds created and regulated solely by ACST. The school offers English, Math, Biology, Chemistry, Physics, and ESS as core subjects. ACST also offers electives that students may take in addition to the core subject. The high school electives for the 2007–2008 school year include: Music, Art, Advanced Art, Modern Standard Arabic, Technology, Model United Nations, Drama, Introduction to Research, 20th Century African History, and German.

=== IB Diploma Program ===
A basic IB Diploma Program is offered to all students in Grades 11 and 12 (or junior and senior) years as well as American style high school electives for non-IB Diploma students who only seek the ACST Diploma. The school grades student using both their own American style grading scale as well as having their students take the IB Exams which are externally marked by the International Baccalaureat Organization.
