= 2026 FIP calendar =

Padel tour

Tournament information
- Sport: Padel
- Location: Worldwide
- Dates: January 2026–December 2026

The 2026 FIP calendar refers to the main global professional padel tour for the year 2026 organized by the International Padel Federation (FIP). Since January 2025, the Tour comprises two tiers: Premier Padel (Major, P1 and P2) and Cupra FIP Tour (Platinum, Gold, Silver and Bronze). The season ends in December with Tour Finals featuring the best pairs in the world.

Premier Padel circuit was established by FIP in early 2022 with the financial support of Qatar Sports Investments and backed by Professional Padel Players Association (PPA). In August 2023, QSI acquired rival padel tour World Padel Tour from Damm, thus becoming the main global padel tour.

== Schedule ==
Key

World Championships
Tour Finals
Premier Padel (Major, P1 & P2)
Cupra FIP Tour (Platinum)
Cupra FIP Tour (Gold)
Cupra FIP Tour (Silver)
Cupra FIP Tour (Bronze)

=== January ===
Tournament	Men's winners	Men's runners-up	Women's winners	Women's runners-up
FIP Bronze Melbourne Padel Open; Melbourne, Australia €11,400; 8–11 January 2026	Simone Cremona (ITA); Sten Richters (NED); 6–3, 6–3	Guillem Figuerola (ESP); Roberto Belmont (ESP)	Carla Fernández (ESP); Nerea Guerra (ESP); 6–1, 6–2	Jimena Díaz (ESP); Cristina Carrascosa (ESP)
FIP Silver Australian Padel Open; Melbourne, Australia €19,950; 15–18 January 2026	Jordi Casanova (ESP); Miguel Morales (ESP); 7–5, 6–4	Guillem Figuerola (ESP); Roberto Belmont (ESP)	Carla Fernández (ESP); Nerea Guerra (ESP); 6–2, 6–3	Victoria Kurz (GER); Eugènia Guimet (ESP)
FIP Silver Caen; Caen, France €25,000; 21–24 January 2026	Marc Sintes (ESP); Daniel Santigosa (ESP); 6–4, 6–3	Álvaro Cepero (ESP); Arnau Ayats (UAE)	Alix Collombon (FRA); Jana Montes (ESP); 6–2, 7–6^{4}	Aida Martínez (ESP); Anna Ortiz (ESP)
FIP Bronze Mallorca; Manacor, Spain €12,000; 23–25 January 2026	Jose Luis González (ESP); Pincho Fernández (ESP); 7–5, 6–4	Mario del Castillo (ESP); Nacho Vilariño (ESP)	Sofi Saiz (ESP); Eugènia Guimet (ESP); 4–6, 6–3, 6–3	Patricia Martínez (ESP); Marta Arellano (ESP)
FIP Bronze Mumbai; Mumbai, India €8,500; 23–25 January 2026	Marcos Córdoba (ESP); Borja Trujillo (ESP); 7–5, 7–6^{2}	Thijs Roper (NED); Daniel Appelgren (SWE)	No women's draw	
FIP Bronze Comunidad Valenciana I Beniparrell, Spain €8,500; 29–31 January 2026	Adrián Marqués (ESP); Daniel Luna (ESP); 7–6, 3–6, 6–4	Javi Rico (ESP); Christian Fuster (ESP)	Ksenia Sharifova (AIN); Marta Borrero (ESP); 6–2, 6–4	Ainize Santamaría (ESP); Coral Álvarez (ESP)
Tournament	winners	runners-up	third place	fourth place
Generali Hexagon Cup (Teams); Madrid, Spain €1,000,000; 28 Jan.–1 Feb. 2026	ADvantage Padel Team, 2–0 (Argentina) Martín di Nenno & (Argentina) Juan Tello (Argentina) Delfina Brea & (Spain) Martina Calvo (Spain) Jose Jiménez & (Spain) Manu Castaño	Krü Padel (Argentina) Fede Chingotto & (Spain) Momo González (Portugal) Sofia Araújo & (Argentina) Claudia Jensen (Spain) Andrés Fernández & (Spain) Marc Sintes	RL9 Padel Team, 2–0 (Argentina) Agustín Tapia & (Spain) Jon Sanz (Spain) Andrea Ustero & (Spain) Ariana Sánchez (Spain) Diego García & (Spain) Daniel Santigosa	Team BELLA Puerto Rico (Spain) Arturo Coello & (Spain) Edu Alonso (Spain) Bea González & (Spain) Beatriz Caldera (Argentina) Juani Rubini & (Spain) Aimar Goñi
Tournament	Men's winners	Men's runners-up	Women's winners	Women's runners-up
FIP Bronze Doha; Doha, Qatar €8,500; 30 Jan.–1 Feb. 2026	Mario del Castillo (ESP); Nacho Vilariño (ESP); 7–5, 6–1	Pablo Reina (ESP); Miguel Morales (ESP)	Alba Pérez (ESP); Aimee Gibson (GBR); 6–2, 1–6, 3–2^{rtd.}	Camila Ramme (MEX); Brittany Dubins (USA)
FIP Bronze San Antonio; San Antonio, Chile €4,500; 30 Jan.–2 Feb. 2026	Franco dal Bianco (ARG); Leonardo Yob (ARG) w/o	Javier Valdés (CHL); Renzo Núñez (ARG)	No women's draw	

=== February ===
Tournament	Men's winners	Men's runners-up	Women's winners	Women's runners-up
FIP Platinum Marseille; Marseille, France €120,000; 4–8 February 2026	Fran Guerrero (ESP); Javier Leal (ESP); 3–6, 6–3, 6–4	Lucas Bergamini (BRA); Javi Garrido (ESP)	Lucía Sainz (ESP); Raquel Eugenio (ESP); 3–2^{rtd.}	Alejandra Alonso (ESP); Alejandra Salazar (ESP)
FIP Bronze Madeira; Funchal, Portugal €10,000; 6–8 February 2026	Pedro Araújo (POR); Pedro Graça (POR); 3–6, 6–4, 6–3	Simone Cremona (ITA); Sten Richters (NED)	Ariadna Cañellas (ESP); Lucía Peralta (ESP); 6–0, 6–4	Carla Fernández (ESP); Nerea Guerra (ESP)
FIP Bronze Bahrain; Manama, Bahrain €8,500; 6–8 February 2026	Agustín Torre (ARG); Aris Patiniotis (ITA); 6–4, 6–2	Jose Luis González (ESP); Pincho Fernández (ESP)	Virginia Riera (ARG); Teresa Navarro (ESP); 6–2, 7–5	Vilena Petrova (AIN); Vlada Kutuzova (AIN)
Premier Padel P1 Riyadh; Riyadh, Saudi Arabia €479,068; 9–14 February 2026	Arturo Coello (ESP); Agustín Tapia (ARG); 6–4, 6–2	Federico Chingotto (ARG); Alejandro Galán (ESP)	Ariana Sánchez (ESP); Andrea Ustero (ESP); 3–6, 6–1, 6–4	Gemma Triay (ESP); Delfina Brea (ARG)
FIP Silver Wadi Padel; Wadi El Natrun, Egypt €9,000; 11–14 February 2026	Marcos González (ESP); Víctor Mena (ESP); 2–6, 6–4, 6–4	Martín Abud (PAR); Dylan Cuello (ARG)	No women's draw	
FIP Bronze Wadi Padel; Wadi El Natrun, Egypt €4,250; 11–14 February 2026	No men's draw		Daiara Valenzuela (ARG); Raquel Piltcher (BRA); 7–6^{4}, 6–4	Carlotta Casali (ITA); Clarissa Aima (ITA)
FIP Silver DAMAC Dubai; Dubai, United Arab Emirates €20,000; 18–22 February 2026	Pol Hernández (ESP); Guillermo Collado (ESP); 6–1, 6–3	Lucas Bergamini (BRA); Javi Garrido (ESP)	Virginia Riera (ARG); Teresa Navarro (ESP); 6–2, 6–3	Giorgia Marchetti (ITA); Léa Godallier (FRA)
FIP Bronze Morocco FRMT 1 Agadir, Morocco €4,250; 20–22 February 2026	Flavio Abbate (ITA); Álvaro Montiel (ITA); 6–3, 2–6, 7–5	Mario Huete (ESP); Marco Cassetta (ITA)	No women's draw	
FIP Silver ESC Padel; Espoo, Finland €18,000; 26–28 February 2026	Pol Hernández (ESP); Guillermo Collado (ESP); 6–3, ^{6}6–7, 6–4	Leonel Aguirre (ARG); Alex Arroyo (ESP)	Noa Cánovas (ESP); Laia Rodríguez (ESP); 6–1, 6–1	Noemí Aguilar (ESP); Sandra Bellver (ESP)
FIP Bronze Agrigento; Agrigento, Italy €8,500; 27 Feb.–1 Mar. 2026	Alonso Rodríguez (ESP); Juani de Pascual (ARG); 6–0, 3–6, 7–5	Flavio Abbate (ITA); Álvaro Montiel (ITA)	Virginia Riera (ARG); Teresa Navarro (ESP); 7–5, 7–5	Emily Stellato (ITA); Giulia Sussarello (ITA)

=== March ===
Tournament	Men's winners	Men's runners-up	Women's winners	Women's runners-up
FIP Bronze WePadel Tournament; Alexandria, Egypt €8,500; 5–7 March 2026	Alex Urzola (ESP); Alberto Gasca (ESP); 6–1, 6–3	Pepe Aliaga (ESP); Luis Oliver (ESP)	Marta Arellano (ESP); María Portillo (ESP); 6–3, 6–4	Rebeca López (ESP); Lucía Micaela (ESP)
Premier Padel P2 Gijón; Gijón, Spain €264,534; 3–8 March 2026	Alejandro Galán (ESP); Federico Chingotto (ARG); 7–5, 7–6^{3}	Agustín Tapia (ARG); Arturo Coello (ESP)	Gemma Triay (ESP); Delfina Brea (ARG); 6–4, ^{4}6–7, 6–3	Ariana Sánchez (ESP); Andrea Ustero (ESP)
FIP Gold Ponta Delgada; Ponta Delgada, Portugal €50,000; 6–8 March 2026	Álex Ruiz (ESP); Juanlu Esbrí (ESP); 6–4, 7–6^{4}	Federico Mouriño (ARG); Marc Quílez (ESP)	Patricia Llaguno (ESP); Martina Fassio (ARG); 6–3, 6–2	Lucía Martínez (ESP); Águeda Pérez (ESP)
FIP Bronze Padel Shop Open; Houten, Netherlands €12,000; 6–8 March 2026	Clément Geens (BEL); Dylan Guichard (FRA); 6–4, 6–0	Guillem Figuerola (ESP); Roberto Belmont (ESP)	Mónica Gómez (ESP); Claudia Escacena (ESP); 7–6^{4}, 7–5	Natividad López (ESP); Victoria Kurz (GER)
FIP Bronze Burriana; Burriana, Spain €8,500; 6–8 March 2026	Alonso Rodríguez (ESP); Juani de Pascual (ARG); 6–3, 6–4	Ramiro Pereyra (ARG); Exequiel Mouriño (ARG)	Daiara Valenzuela (ARG); María Laura Ferreyra (ARG); 5–7, 6–2, 7–6^{6}	Ariadna Cañellas (ESP); Lucía Peralta (ESP)
FIP Bronze Gaúcho; Santa Maria, Brazil €8,500; 6–8 March 2026	Naim Díaz (ARG); Santino Contreras (ARG); 6–1, 6–4	Santiago Rolla (ARG); Fabricio Peirón (ARG)	Camila Ramme (MEX); Catarina Santos (POR); 4–6, 7–5, 6–0	Manuela Schuck (BRA); Cristina Cirne (BRA)
FIP Bronze Singapore; Bukit Merah, Singapore €8,500; 6–8 March 2026	Pablo Sanchez (ESP); Adrián Naranjo (ESP); 6–3, 6–2	Marcos Córdoba (ESP); Borja Trujillo (ESP)	Lucía Pérez (ESP); Catherine Rose (GBR); 6–3, 6–4	Carla Fernández (ESP); Nerea Guerra (ESP)
FIP Silver Manila; Manila, Philippines €9,000; 13–15 March 2026	No men's draw		Lucía Sainz (ESP); Virginia Riera (ARG); 6–2, 6–1	Alba Pérez (ESP); Alba Gallardo (ESP)
FIP Silver Joinville; Joinville, Brazil €9,000; 13–15 March 2026	Luciano Puppo (ARG); Máximo Maldonado (ARG); 6–4, 1–6, 6–3	Martín Abud (PAR); Franco dal Bianco (ARG)	No women's draw	
FIP Bronze Siracusa; Syracuse, Italy €8,500; 13–15 March 2026	José Solano (ESP); Ramiro Pereyra (ARG); 6–3, 6–1	Mario Huete (ESP); Marco Cassetta (ITA)	Letizia Manquillo (ESP); Noemí Aguilar (ESP); 6–3, 6–3	Lara Arruabarrena (ESP); Marina Lobo (ESP)
FIP Bronze Joinville; Joinville, Brazil €4,250; 13–15 March 2026	No men's draw		Ainize Santamaría (ESP); Jimena Díaz (ESP)^{6}6–7, 7–6^{4}, 6–2	Manuela Schuck (BRA); Cristina Cirne (BRA)
Premier Padel P2 Cancún; Isla Mujeres, Mexico €264,534; 17–22 March 2026	Agustín Tapia (ARG); Arturo Coello (ESP)^{5}6–7, 6–3, 7–5	Juan Lebrón (ESP); Leandro Augsburger (ARG)	Gemma Triay (ESP); Delfina Brea (ARG); 7–6^{4}, 6–1	Paula Josemaría (ESP); Bea González (ESP)
FIP Silver Mediolanum Padel Cup; Parma, Italy €20,000; 19–22 March 2026	Mario del Castillo (ESP); Nacho Vilariño (UAE); 6–4, 5–7, 6–3	Ramiro Pereyra (ARG); Pedro Perry (POR)	Lucía Sainz (ESP); Raquel Eugenio (ESP); 7–5, 6–1	Carolina Orsi (ITA); Letizia Manquillo (ESP)
FIP Bronze GO PARK Hong Kong; Ma On Shan, Hong Kong €8,500; 19–22 March 2026	Héctor Vázquez (ESP); Pablo Reina (ESP); 6–4, 6–4	Julien Seurin (FRA); Thomas Vanbauce (FRA)	Patricia Araus (ESP); Cristina Carrascosa (ESP); 6–3, 6–1	Catherine Rose (GBR); Carmen Azcoitia (ESP)
FIP Bronze Sweden I Helsingborg, Sweden €12,000; 20–22 March 2026	Nicolás Zurita (ITA); Samuel Rivas (ESP); 5–7, 7–6^{1}, 6–4	Marcos González (ESP); Víctor Mena (ESP)	Mónica Gómez (ESP); Claudia Escacena (ESP); 6–4, 5–7, 6–3	Lara Arruabarrena (ESP); Marina Lobo (ESP)
FIP Bronze Elite Padel Nairobi; Nairobi, Kenya €12,000; 20–22 March 2026	Pablo Sánchez (ESP); Adrián Naranjo (ESP)^{5}6–7, 6–4, 7–6^{7}	Víctor Tur (ESP); Agustín Reca (GER)	Alexandra Silva (POR); Mafalda Fernandes (POR); 6–2, 5–1^{rtd.}	Camille Sireix (FRA); Melissa Martin (FRA)
FIP Bronze Litas Kaunas; Kaunas, Lithuania €8,500; 20–22 March 2026	Sergio Arias (ESP); Aarón García (ESP); 7–6^{4}, 7–5	Alex Loughlan (GBR); Louie Harris (GBR)	Patricia Martínez (ESP); Marta Arellano (ESP); 6–3, 6–1	Camila Fassio (ESP); Carla Touly (FRA)
Premier Padel P1 Miami; Miami Beach, United States €479,068; 23–29 March 2026	Alejandro Galán (ESP); Federico Chingotto (ARG); 7–5, 3–6, 6–3	Agustín Tapia (ARG); Arturo Coello (ESP)	Paula Josemaría (ESP); Bea González (ESP); 6–3, 4–6, 7–5	Delfina Brea (ARG); Gemma Triay (ESP)
FIP Bronze Viseu; Viseu, Portugal €10,000; 26–29 March 2026	José Solano (ESP); Ramiro Pereyra (ARG); 6–4, 6–1	Pedro Araújo (POR); Pedro Graça (POR)	Mónica Gómez (ESP); Claudia Escacena (ESP); 6–4, 6–3	Natividad López (ESP); Victoria Kurz (GER)
FIP Silver Kalat; Caltanissetta, Italy €18,000; 27–29 March 2026	Marcos González (ESP); Víctor Mena (ESP); 6–2, 5–7, 7–6^{4}	Javi Ruiz (ESP); Gonzalo Rubio (ESP)	Carolina Orsi (ITA); Letizia Manquillo (ESP); 7–5, 6–2	Emily Stellato (ITA); Giulia Sussarello (ITA)
FIP Bronze Hong Kong II; Sai Kung Town, Hong Kong €8,500; 27–29 March 2026	Héctor Vázquez (ESP); Pablo Reina (ESP); 6–4, 6–4	Giulio Graziotti (ITA); Julián Lacamoire (ARG)	Patricia Araus (ESP); Kotomi Ozawa (JPN); 7–6^{5}, 5–7, 7–6^{5}	Vilena Petrova (AIN); Vlada Kutuzova (AIN)

=== April ===
Tournament	Men's winners	Men's runners-up	Women's winners	Women's runners-up
FIP Silver Betclic; Abidjan, Ivory Coast €18,000; 2–4 April 2026	Iñigo Jofre (UAE); David Gala (ESP); 6–1, 6–2	Alberto Gª Jiménez (ESP); Christian Medina (GBR)	Marta Caparrós (ESP); Julieta Bidahorria (ARG); 6–3, 6–4	Letizia Manquillo (ESP); Laura Luján (ESP)
FIP Gold Almaty; Almaty, Kazakhstan €50,000; 2–5 April 2026	Martín di Nenno (ARG); Momo González (ESP); 6–2, 6–3	Javier Leal (ESP); Pablo Lijó (ESP)	Aranzazu Osoro (ARG); Victoria Iglesias (ESP); 6–3, 6–4	Jessica Castelló (ESP); Lorena Rufo (ESP)
FIP Bronze Netherlands; Houten, Netherlands €12,000; 3–5 April 2026	Javi García (ESP); Jose Jiménez (ESP); 6–3, 6–4	Agustín Torre (ARG); Luciano Capra (ARG)	Melani Merino (ESP); Sandra Bellver (ESP); 6–3, 6–4	Lorena Vano (ITA); Xènia Clascà (ESP)
FIP Bronze Mumbai II; Mumbai, India €8,500; 3–5 April 2026	Gonzalo Rubio (ESP); Nacho Vilariño (UAE); 6–3, 6–1	Thijs Roper (NED); Willy Släryd (SWE)	No women's draw	
FIP Silver Aguascalientes; Aguascalientes, Mexico €10,000; 9–11 April 2026	Alex Chozas (ARG); Valentino Libaak (ARG); 6–4, 6–4	Leonel Aguirre (ARG); Matías Almada (ARG)	No women's draw	
FIP Bronze Aguascalientes; Aguascalientes, Mexico €4,250; 9–11 April 2026	No men's draw		Camila Ramme (MEX); Manuela Schuck (BRA); 6–4, ^{4}6–7, 6–3	Ainize Santamaría (ESP); Jimena Díaz (ESP)
FIP Silver Mumbai; Mumbai, India €18,000; 9–12 April 2026	Rodrigo Coello (ESP); Alfonso Sánchez (ESP); 7–6^{3}, 3–6, 7–6^{4}	Curro Cabeza (ESP); Mariano González (PAR)	Marta Barrera (ESP); Jimena Velasco (ESP); 6–1, 6–2	Ariadna Cañellas (ESP); Lucía Peralta (ESP)
FIP Bronze Baku; Baku, Azerbaijan €8,500; 10–12 April 2026	Albert Trillas (ESP); Daniel Luna (ESP); 3–6, 6–3, 6–0	Tonet Sans (ESP); Gustavo Nunes (POR)	Lucía Micaela (ESP); María Portillo (ESP); 6–1, 6–4	Dora Chamli (TUN); Anastasiia Ryzhova (AIN)
FIP Bronze Elche; Elche, Spain €8,500; 10–12 April 2026	Daniel Santigosa (ESP); Marc Sintes (ESP); 6–4, 6–3	Juani Rubini (ARG); Manu Castaño (ESP)	Noemí Aguilar (ESP); Amanda López (ESP); 4–6, 6–3, 6–2	Claudia Escacena (ESP); María Delgado (ESP)
FIP Bronze Rivesaltes; Rivesaltes, France €8,500; 10–12 April 2026	Joel Olivera (ESP); Antonio Varo (ESP); 7–6^{4}, 6–4	Nacho Moragues (ESP); Manuel Aragón (ESP)	Caterina Baldi (ITA); Clarissa Aima (ITA); 3–6, 7–6^{5}, 6–4	Carla Touly (FRA); Marcella Koek (NED)
FIP Bronze S4Sport Open; Eidsvoll, Norway €8,500; 10–12 April 2026	Nuno Deus (POR); Pedro Perry (POR); 6–1, 6–4	Sten Richters (NED); Pau Miñano (ESP)	Laura Luján (ESP); Julia Polo (ESP); 6–1, 6–2	Ana Sánchez (ESP); Natalia Molinilla (ESP)
Premier Padel P2 NewGiza; Giza, Egypt €264,534; 13–18 April 2026	Alejandro Galán (ESP); Federico Chingotto (ARG); 6–4, 6–1	Franco Stupaczuk (ARG); Miguel Yanguas (ESP)	Paula Josemaría (ESP); Bea González (ESP); 6–4, 5–7, 6–4	Delfina Brea (ARG); Gemma Triay (ESP)
FIP Silver Nola; Nola, Italy €18,000; 17–19 April 2026	Alex Chozas (ARG); Valentino Libaak (ARG); 7–6^{10}, 6–4	Sanyo Gutiérrez (ARG); Víctor Ruiz (ESP)	Raquel Eugenio (ESP); Martina Fassio (ARG); 6–1, 6–2	Lucía Sainz (ESP); Araceli Martínez (ESP)
FIP Bronze Kuala Lumpur; Kuala Lumpur, Malaysia €8,500; 17–19 April 2026	Luis Oliver (ESP); Pablo Pastor (ESP); 5–7, 7–6^{5}, 2–1^{rtd.}	Mario del Castillo (ESP); Nacho Vilariño (UAE)	Marcella Koek (NED); Bo Luttikhuis (NED); 7–6^{5}, 6–1	Julia Polo (ESP); Patricia Martínez (ESP)
FIP Bronze Cyprus I Ayia Napa, Cyprus €8,500; 17–19 April 2026	Flavio Abbate (ITA); Álvaro Montiel (ITA); 7–6^{5}, 7–5	Adrián Marqués (ESP); Daniel Luna (ESP)	Melani Merino (ESP); Sandra Bellver (ESP); 6–2, 6–2	Ainize Santamaría (ESP); Blanca Arriola (ESP)
FIP Bronze ICÓNICO Sports; Seville, Spain €8,500; 17–19 April 2026	Diego García (ESP); Santi Pineda (ESP); 7–5, 6–1	Andrés Fernández (ESP); Mario Ortega (ESP)	Laia Rodríguez (ESP); Amanda López (ESP); 3–6, 6–3, 6–3	Alix Collombon (FRA); Jana Montes (ESP)
FIP Bronze Ijuí; Ijuí, Brazil €8,500; 17–19 April 2026	Juani de Pascual (ARG); Franco dal Bianco (ARG); 6–3, 7–6^{3}	Naim Díaz (ARG); Santino Contreras (ARG)	Manuela Schuck (BRA); Cristina Cirne (BRA)^{4}6–7, 7–6^{5}, 6–2	Alessandra de Barros (BRA); Fernanda Abarzúa (BRA)
FIP Bronze Marrakech; Marrakesh, Morocco €4,250; 17–19 April 2026	Curro Cabeza (ESP); Mariano González (PAR)^{0}6–7, 6–4, 6–3	Emilio Chamero (ESP); Alberto Gª Trabanco (ESP)	No women's draw	
FIP Bronze Aquahobby Isla de la Palma; Los Llanos de Aridane, Spain €10,000; 23–25 April 2026	Enrique Goenaga (ESP); Andrés Fernández (ESP); 6–3, 7–5	Emilio Chamero (ESP); Alberto Gª Trabanco (ESP)	Carla Fernández (ESP); Nerea Guerra (ESP); 6–3, 3–6, 6–2	María Delgado (ESP); Susana Martín (ESP)
Premier Padel P2 Brussels; Brussels, Belgium €264,534; 21–26 April 2026	Juan Lebrón (ESP); Leandro Augsburger (ARG); 2–6, 6–3, 6–3	Arturo Coello (ESP); Agustín Tapia (ARG)	Paula Josemaría (ESP); Bea González (ESP); 7–5, 6–2	Delfina Brea (ARG); Gemma Triay (ESP)
FIP Silver Mediolanum Padel Cup; Bari, Italy €20,000; 23–26 April 2026	Jose Luis González (ESP); Marco Cassetta (ITA); 7–6^{4}, 6–3	Nacho Moragues (ESP); Manuel Aragón (ESP)	Alix Collombon (FRA); Jana Montes (ESP); 7–6^{2}, 6–3	Raquel Eugenio (ESP); Martina Fassio (ARG)
FIP Silver Kuala Lumpur; Kuala Lumpur, Malaysia €20,000; 24–26 April 2026	Gonzalo Rubio (ESP); Nacho Piotto (ARG); 7–5, 6–1	Denis Perino (ITA); Pincho Fernández (ESP)	Julia Polo (ESP); Patricia Martínez (ESP); 2–6, 6–4, 7–5	Giorgia Marchetti (ITA); Léa Godallier (FRA)
FIP Bronze Cyprus II; Ayia Napa, Cyprus €8,500; 24–26 April 2026	Flavio Abbate (ITA); Álvaro Montiel (ITA); 7–6^{2}, 6–1	Luis Hernández (ESP); Enzo Jensen (ITA)	Natividad López (ESP); Victoria Kurz (GER); 6–4, ^{3}6–7, 6–0	Mónica Gómez (ESP); Claudia Escacena (ESP)
FIP Bronze Paraguay I Asunción, Paraguay €8,500; 24–26 April 2026	Javier Valdés (CHI); Renzo Núñez (ARG); 7–6^{9}, 6–2	Octavio Álvarez (ARG); Mateo Álvarez (ARG)	Sofía Luini (ARG); Belén Mosca (ARG); 6–2, 6–3	Catalina Arancibia (CHL); Kimberley Ahumada (CHL)
FIP Bronze Chile II; Padre Hurtado, Chile €4,500; 24–26 April 2026	Juani de Pascual (ARG); Facundo López (ARG); 6–4, 6–3	Luciano Puppo (ARG); Máximo Maldonado (ARG)	No women's draw	
FIP Silver Leiria Master Padel; Leiria, Portugal €30,000; 30 Apr.–3 May 2026	Luis Hernández (ESP); Enzo Jensen (ITA); 6–4, 6–3	Jose Gª Diestro (ESP); Maxi Sánchez (ARG)	Patricia Llaguno (ESP); Carolina Orsi (ITA); 6–1, 6–1	Marta Caparrós (ESP); Julieta Bidahorria (ARG)

=== May ===
Tournament	Men's winners	Men's runners-up	Women's winners	Women's runners-up
FIP Silver BMW Marmotor 26º Aniv. Club La Calzada; Las Palmas, Spain €18,000; 1–3 May 2026	Javi García (ESP); Jose Jiménez (ESP); 7–6^{2}, 6–4	Curro Cabeza (ESP); Mariano González (PAR)	Raquel Eugenio (ESP); Martina Fassio (ARG); 4–6, 6–3, 6–2	Lucía Martínez (ESP); Águeda Pérez (ESP)
FIP Silver Cyprus I Ayia Napa, Cyprus €18,000; 1–3 May 2026	Flavio Abbate (ITA); Álvaro Montiel (ITA); 4–6, 6–1, 6–4	Enrique Goenaga (ESP); Andrés Fernández (ESP)	Marta Barrera (ESP); Jimena Velasco (ESP); 6–4, 6–4	Natividad López (ESP); Victoria Kurz (GER)
FIP Silver Mendoza; San Martín, Argentina €10,000; 1–3 May 2026	Alex Chozas (ARG); Valentino Libaak (ARG); 5–7, 7–6^{3}, 7–6^{6}	Maxi Sánchez (ARG); Juani Rubini (ARG)	No women's draw	
FIP Bronze Singapore II; Tanglin, Singapore €8,500; 1–3 May 2026	Maxime Joris (FRA); Manuel Vives (FRA); 6–4, 6–4	Víctor Tur (ESP); Agustín Reca (GER)	Jimena Díaz (ESP); Alba Vázquez (ESP); 6–3, 6–4	Angelina Neizvestnaya (RUS); Elsa Terranova (ITA)
FIP Bronze Montesilvano; Montesilvano, Italy €8,500; 1–3 May 2026	Emilio Chamero (ESP); Alberto Gª Trabanco (ESP); 6–4, 7–5	Marco Cassetta (ITA); Dylan Guichard (FRA)	Caterina Baldi (ITA); Clarissa Aima (ITA); 6–3, 6–2	Carla Touly (FRA); Giulia Sussarello (ITA)
FIP Silver Horama; Teramo, Italy €20,000; 7–9 May 2026	Javi García (ESP); Jose Jiménez (ESP); 6–3, 4–6, 6–2	Adrián Marqués (ESP); Daniel Luna (ESP)	Bárbara Las Heras (ESP); Carla Mesa (ESP); 6–2, 6–4	Carolina Orsi (ITA); Emily Stellato (ITA)
FIP Silver Vila Real de Santo António; Vila Real de Santo António, Portugal €18,000; 7–9 May 2026	Javi Ruiz (ESP); Gonzalo Rubio (ESP)^{6}6–7, 7–6^{7}, 6–1	Mario del Castillo (ESP); Nacho Vilariño (UAE)	Raquel Eugenio (ESP); Martina Fassio (ARG); 6–2, 6–0	Marta Barrera (ESP); Jimena Velasco (ESP)
Premier Padel P2 Asunción; Asunción, Paraguay €264,534; 5–10 May 2026	Alejandro Galán (ESP); Federico Chingotto (ARG); 6–3, 7–5	Agustín Tapia (ARG); Arturo Coello (ESP)	Bea González (ESP); Paula Josemaría (ESP); 4–6, 6–3, 6–3	Gemma Triay (ESP); Delfina Brea (ARG)
FIP Bronze Prishtina; Pristina, Kosovo €12,000; 8–10 May 2026	Julian Prins (NED); Youp de Kroon (NED); 7–6^{5}, 6–4	Pepe Aliaga (ESP); Pau Miñano (ESP)	Natividad López (ESP); Victoria Kurz (GER); 6–3, 6–2	Louise Bahurel (FRA); Ivet Val (ESP)
FIP Bronze Mos Mosh Gallery KIF Padel Masters; Kolding, Denmark €10,000; 8–10 May 2026	Albert Roglán (ESP); Iago Fuertes (ESP); 4–6, 6–3, 6–4	Adam Axelsson (SWE); Rodrigo Coello (ESP)	Maria Rasmussen (DEN); Gitte Haxen (DEN); 6–4, 7–6^{2}	Marcella Koek (NED); Bo Luttikhuis (NED)
FIP Bronze Samui; Ko Samui, Thailand €8,500; 8–10 May 2026	Sergio Icardo (UAE); Jordi Casanova (ESP)^{5}6–7, 7–5, 6–4	Héctor Vázquez (ESP); Asier Martínez (ESP)	Alba Pérez (ESP); Alba Gallardo (ESP); 6–2, 6–2	Camille Sireix (FRA); Carmen Azcoitia (ESP)
FIP Bronze London; London, England €8,500; 8–10 May 2026	Marcos González (ESP); Víctor Mena (ESP); 7–6^{3}, 6–3	Luis Oliver (ESP); Pablo Pastor (ESP)	Ana Domínguez (ESP); Carlotta Casali (ITA); 1–6, 6–3, 6–4	María Portillo (ESP); Carmen Castillón (ESP)
FIP Bronze Bratislava; Bratislava, Slovakia €8,500; 14–16 May 2026	Pablo Sánchez (ESP); Adrián Naranjo (ESP); 4–6, 6–3, 7–6^{6}	Simone Iacovino (ITA); Giulio Graziotti (ITA)	Giulia Sussarello (ITA); Emily Stellato (ITA); 2–6, 6–0, 6–4	Lorena Vano (ITA); Xènia Clascà (ESP)
FIP Bronze Egypt III; Alexandria, Egypt €8,500; 14–16 May 2026	Ferrán Insa (ESP); Daniel Luna (ESP); 5–7, 6–2, 6–3	Miguel Melero (ESP); Pablo Reina (ESP)	Anna Ortiz (ESP); María Laura Ferreyra (ARG); 6–2, 7–5	Carla Fernández (ESP); Nerea Guerra (ESP)
Premier Padel P1 Buenos Aires; Buenos Aires, Argentina €479,068; 12–17 May 2026	Federico Chingotto (ARG); Alejandro Galán (ESP); 6–2, 6–1	Arturo Coello (ESP); Agustín Tapia (ARG)	Bea González (ESP); Paula Josemaría (ESP); 6–3, 7–5	Delfina Brea (ARG); Gemma Triay (ESP)
FIP Bronze Miami; Miami, United States €8,500; 14–17 May 2026	Rodrigo Coello (ESP); Jaume Romera (ESP); 6–4, 6–2	Pablo Padilla (MEX); Juan Pablo Castillo (MEX)	Camila Ramme (MEX); Brittany Dubins (USA); 6–1, 6–1	Julie Razafindranaly (FRA); Nada Majdoubi (FRA)
FIP Silver Timișoara; Timișoara, Romania €20,000; 15–17 May 2026	Marcos González (ESP); Víctor Mena (ESP); 7–6^{6}, 7–6^{6}	Clément Geens (BEL); Andrés Graupera (ARG)	Caterina Baldi (ITA); Clarissa Aima (ITA); 6–0, 6–3	Ainize Santamaría (ESP); Jimena Díaz (ESP)
FIP Bronze Phangan; Ko Pha-ngan, Thailand €8,500; 15–17 May 2026	Antonio Luque (POR); João Caiano (POR); 6–4, 7–5	Héctor Vázquez (ESP); Asier Martínez (ESP)	Alba Pérez (ESP); Alba Gallardo (ESP); 6–1, 3–6, 6–1	Camille Sireix (FRA); Carmen Azcoitia (ESP)
FIP Bronze Lotto; Bydgoszcz, Poland €8,500; 15–17 May 2026	Julian Prins (NED); Youp de Kroon (NED); 6–4, 7–6^{9}	Diogo Jesus (POR); Douglas Rutgersson (SWE)	Camila Fassio (ESP); María Delgado (ESP); 6–3, 4–6, 7–6^{3}	María Portillo (ESP); Carmen Castillón (ESP)
FIP Bronze Marnes; Marnes-la-Coquette, France €8,500; 21–23 May 2026	Jérémy Robert (FRA); Olivier Guy de Chamisso (FRA); 6–3, 6–4	Nicolás Zurita (ITA); Samuel Rivas (ESP)	Léa Godallier (FRA); Lucía Peralta (ESP); 7–6^{2}, 6–3	Daiara Valenzuela (ARG); María Laura Ferreyra (ARG)
FIP Silver Oeiras; Oeiras, Portugal €18,000; 22–24 May 2026	Fran Guerrero (ESP); Javier Leal (ESP); 7–6^{4}, 6–2	Diego García (ESP); Santi Pineda (ESP)	Marta Talaván (ESP); Sofi Saiz (ESP); 6–3, 6–4	Ksenia Sharifova (RUS); Alix Collombon (FRA)
FIP Silver HOP London Padel Open; London, England €18,000; 22–24 May 2026	Alex Arroyo (ESP); Javier Martínez (ESP); 6–4, 6–3	Pol Hernández (ESP); Guillermo Collado (ESP)	Jessica Castelló (ESP); Lorena Rufo (ESP); 6–1, 6–4	Amanda López (ESP); Carla Touly (FRA)
FIP Bronze Yogyakarta; Yogyakarta, Indonesia €8,500; 22–24 May 2026	Miguel Melero (ESP); Pablo Reina (ESP); 7–6^{4}, 6–3	Fran Ramírez (ESP); Alejandro Calvo (ESP)	Sandra Bellver (ESP); Novela Putria (INA); 7–5, 7–5	Patrícia Ribeiro (POR); Carla Serrano (ESP)
FIP Bronze Latina; Latina, Italy €8,500; 22–24 May 2026	Daniel Santigosa (ESP); Marc Sintes (ESP)^{1}6–7, 4–2^{rtd.}	Jose Luis González (ESP); Antonio Varo (ESP)	Noa Cánovas (ESP); Laia Rodríguez (ESP); 6–3, 7–6^{5}	Rebeca López (ESP); Anna Ortiz (ESP)
FIP Platinum Albania; Tirana, Albania €150,000; 26–30 May 2026	Franco Stupaczuk (ARG); Miguel Yanguas (ESP); 6–4, 4–6, 7–5	David Gala (ESP); Enzo Jensen (ITA)	Marina Guinart (ESP); Verónica Virseda (ESP); 7–5, 6–1	Alejandra Salazar (ESP); Alejandra Alonso (ESP)
FIP Bronze DAMAC Abu Dhabi; Abu Dhabi, United Arab Emirates €12,000; 28–31 May 2026	Sergio Icardo (UAE); Fran Jurado (UAE); 6–3, 5–7, 6–4	Pedro Araújo (POR); Pedro Graça (POR)	Bárbara Las Heras (ESP); Daria Kucheriavaia (RUS); 2–6, 6–4, 6–3	Lucía Pérez (ESP); Catherine Rose (GBR)
FIP Bronze Pembroke; Pembroke, Malta €9,000; 28–31 May 2026	Ramiro Pereyra (ARG); José Solano (ESP); 7–6^{7}, 6–1	Marcel Font (ESP); Giuseppe Fino (ITA)	Julia Polo (ESP); Marina Lobo (ESP); 6–4, 6–1	Constança Gorito (POR); Liza Groenveld (NED)
FIP Silver Höganäs; Höganäs, Sweden €18,000; 29–31 May 2026	Daniel Santigosa (ESP); Marc Sintes (ESP); 6–3, 6–1	Xisco Gil (ESP); Manu Castaño (ESP)	Letizia Manquillo (ESP); Noemí Aguilar (ESP); 7–6^{2}, 2–6, 6–2	Ksenia Sharifova (RUS); Alix Collombon (FRA)
FIP Bronze Hello Padel; Rijswijk, Netherlands €12,000; 29–31 May 2026	Josete Rico (ESP); Juan Cruz Forastello (ARG); 6–2, 6–4	Marco Cassetta (ITA); Dylan Guichard (FRA)	Justine Pysson (BEL); Elyne Boeykens (BEL); 6–2, 6–4	Janine Hemmes (NED); Steffie Weterings (NED)
FIP Bronze Castellón-Automoción Cano Kia; Castellón de la Plana, Spain €8,500; 29–31 May 2026	Nacho Moragues (ESP); Daniel Luna (ESP); 7–6^{5}, 7–6^{5}	Aris Patiniotis (ITA); Thomas Leygue (FRA)	Patricia Martínez (ESP); Claudia Escacena (ESP); 6–4, 6–1	Claudia Ordóñez (ESP); Daniela Portilla (ESP)
FIP Bronze Chile III; Viña del Mar, Chile €4,500; 29–31 May 2026	Juan Pablo Dametto (ARG); Felipe Calleja (ARG); 7–6^{7}, 5–7, 6–4	Joaquín de Astoreca (ARG); Mauricio Rivero (ARG)	No women's draw	

=== June ===
Tournament	Men's winners	Men's runners-up	Women's winners	Women's runners-up
Premier Padel Italy Major; Rome, Italy €1,044,849; 2–7 June 2026	Agustín Tapia (ARG); Arturo Coello (ESP); 7–5, 7–6^{4}	Alejandro Galán (ESP); Federico Chingotto (ARG)	Gemma Triay (ESP); Delfina Brea (ARG); 6–1, 7–5	Ariana Sánchez (ESP); Andrea Ustero (ESP)
FIP Silver DAMAC Dubai; Dubai, United Arab Emirates €25,000; 4–7 June 2026	Juan Pablo Dametto (ARG); Felipe Calleja (ARG); 7–5, 4–6, 6–4	Pablo Castillo (ESP); Cristóbal García (ESP)	Lucía Pérez (ESP); Catherine Rose (GBR); 7–5, 6–1	Gimena Sol (ARG); Ángela Caro (ESP)
FIP Bronze Hamburg; Hamburg, Germany €8,500; 4–7 June 2026	Giuseppe Fino (ITA); Matteo Rosingana (ITA); 6–3, ^{5}6–7, 6–4	Javi Rico (ESP); Mohamed Alami (MAR)	Camila Ramme (MEX); Brittany Dubins (USA); 6–4, 0–0^{rtd.}	Bo Luttikhuis (NED); Martina Parmigiani (ITA)
FIP Silver Bandol; Bandol, France €30,000; 5–7 June 2026	Jaume Romera (ESP); Nacho Archieri (ARG)^{4}6–7, 6–4, 6–1	Nacho Moragues (ESP); Daniel Luna (ESP)	Lorena Vano (ITA); Xènia Clascà (ESP); 2–6, 7–6^{7}, 6–1	María Portillo (ESP); Carmen Castillón (ESP)
FIP Bronze Matosinhos; Matosinhos, Portugal €12,000; 5–7 June 2026	Sergio Arias (ESP); Aarón García (ESP); 6–1, 5–7, 6–3	Pedro Araújo (POR); Pedro Graça (POR)	Margarida Fernandes (POR); Marianela Montesi (ITA); 7–5, ^{7}6–7, 6–4	Catarina Santos (POR); Tia Norton (GBR)
FIP Bronze Decathlon; Warsaw, Poland €10,000; 5–7 June 2026	Douglas Rutgersson (SWE); Daniel Appelgren (SWE); 3–6, 6–4, 6–1	Abraham Muñoz (ESP); Iker Zamora (ESP)	Paula Ferrán (ESP); Susana Martín (ESP); 6–2, 6–2	María Arteaga (ESP); Nerea Gómez (ESP)
FIP Bronze QNB Cup; Istanbul, Turkey €8,500; 5–7 June 2026	Miguel Melero (ESP); Nicolás Zurita (ITA); 7–6^{5}, 6–3	Héctor Vázquez (ESP); Thijs Roper (NED)	Claudia Ordóñez (ESP); Daniela Portilla (ESP); 6–2, 7–5	Nika Sluzhiteleva (RUS); Daria Kucheriavaia (RUS)
FIP Bronze Dakar; Dakar, Senegal €8,500; 5–7 June 2026	Johan Bergeron (FRA); Julien Seurin (FRA); 6–3, 3–6, 6–3	Luis Oliver (ESP); Pablo Pastor (ESP)	Ainize Santamaría (ESP); Clarinha Santos (POR); 6–3, 6–2	Melissa Martin (FRA); Charlotte Soubrié (FRA)
Premier Padel P1 Valencia; Valencia, Spain €479,068; 8–14 June 2026	Arturo Coello (ESP); Agustín Tapia (ARG)^{4}6–7, 6–1, 7–6^{6}	Alejandro Galán (ESP); Federico Chingotto (ARG)	Ariana Sánchez (ESP); Andrea Ustero (ESP); 6–4, 3–6, 6–2	Claudia Fernández (ESP); Sofia Araújo (POR)
FIP Silver Mediolanum Padel Cup; Palermo, Italy €20,000; 11–14 June 2026	Clément Geens (BEL); Dylan Guichard (FRA); 6–3, 7–6^{5}	Pincho Fernández (ESP); Adrián Marqués (ESP)	Camila Ramme (MEX); Brittany Dubins (USA); 6–2, 2–6, 6–4	Alba Pérez (ESP); Alba Gallardo (ESP)
FIP Bronze Slovenia; Ljubljana, Slovenia €8,500; 11–14 June 2026	Albin Olsson (SWE); Timéo Fonteny (FRA); 7–5, 6–4	Antonio Luque (POR); Pedro Perry (POR)	Giulia Sussarello (ITA); Emily Stellato (ITA); 6–4, 6–1	Marcella Koek (NED); Ana Sánchez (ESP)
FIP Gold Shanghai; Shanghai, China €50,000; 12–14 June 2026	Facundo López (ARG); Julián Lacamoire (ARG); 6–2, 6–4	Denis Perino (ITA); Arnau Ayats (UAE)	Laia Rodríguez (ESP); Noa Cánovas (ESP); 7–6^{6}, 7–5	Marta Borrero (ESP); Giorgia Marchetti (ITA)
FIP Bronze UNOmás Lanzarote I Puerto Calero, Spain €10,000; 12–14 June 2026	Santino Contreras (ARG); Facundo Dehnike (PAR); 3–6, 6–4, 6–3	Alfonso Sánchez (ESP); Samuel Rivas (ESP)	Martina Vera (ESP); Daniela Portilla (ESP); 6–3, 7–5	Anna Ortiz (ESP); Victoria Kurz (GER)
FIP Platinum Lusitania Portugal Master Padel; Paredes, Portugal €120,000; 17–21 June 2026	Juan Tello (ARG); Maxi Arce (ARG); 6–4, 6–2	Sanyo Gutiérrez (ARG); Maxi Sánchez (ARG)	Marina Guinart (ESP); Verónica Virseda (ESP); 6–3, ^{2}6–7, 6–4	Patricia Llaguno (ESP); Carolina Orsi (ITA)
FIP Bronze High Velocity Osaka; Osaka, Japan €8,500; 18–21 June 2026	Toni Bueno (ESP); Mattia Di Bari (ITA); 6–4, 6–4	Alberto Gª Jiménez (ESP); Christian Medina (GBR)	Louise Bahurel (FRA); Ivet Val (ESP); 6–4, 6–0	Carla Fernández (ESP); Nerea Guerra (ESP)
FIP Silver Narbona; Narbonne, France €18,000; 19–21 June 2026	Marcos González (ESP); Martín Abud (PAR); 6–4, 6–4	Franco dal Bianco (ARG); Máximo Maldonado (ARG)	Léa Godallier (FRA); Daiara Valenzuela (ARG); 6–0, 7–6^{5}	Laia Rodríguez (ESP); Noa Cánovas (ESP)
FIP Bronze Cordenons; Cordenons, Italy €10,000; 19–21 June 2026	Jaume Romera (ESP); Sergio Nieto (ESP); 6–3, 4–6, 2–0^{rtd.}	Pincho Fernández (ESP); Adrián Marqués (ESP)	Marina Lobo (ESP); Julia Polo (ESP); 6–1, 6–1	María Delgado (ESP); Chiara Giaquinta (ITA)
FIP Bronze Morocco Padel Tour FRMT 3 Kenitra, Morocco €4,250; 19–21 June 2026	Jose Luis González (ESP); Álvaro Mélendez (ESP); 6–0, 6–4	Leonel Aguirre (ARG); Mohamed Alami (MAR)	No women's draw	
Premier Padel P2 Valladolid; Valladolid, Spain €264,534; 23–28 June 2026	Arturo Coello (ESP); Agustín Tapia (ARG); 6–4, 6–3	Alejandro Galán (ESP); Federico Chingotto (ARG)	Bea González (ESP); Paula Josemaría (ESP); 6–4, 6–2	Ariana Sánchez (ESP); Andrea Ustero (ESP)
FIP Gold Abidjan; Abidjan, Ivory Coast €50,000; 25–28 June 2026	Lucas Bergamini (BRA); Javi Garrido (ESP); 6–3, 3–6, 7–6^{3}	Juan Tello (ARG); Maxi Arce (ARG)	Araceli Martínez (ESP); Laura Luján (ESP); 6–3, 1–6, 6–4	Laia Rodríguez (ESP); Noa Cánovas (ESP)
FIP Silver Giulianova; Giulianova, Italy €18,000; 25–28 June 2026	Jose Luis González (ESP); Álvaro Mélendez (ESP); 2–6, 6–0, 6–1	Aris Patiniotis (ITA); Miguel Benítez (ESP)	Patricia Martínez (ESP); Claudia Escacena (ESP); 6–0, 4–2^{rtd.}	María Portillo (ESP); Carmen Castillón (ESP)
FIP Bronze High Velocity Selangor; Petaling Jaya, Malaysia €8,500; 25–28 June 2026	Miguel Melero (ESP); Nicolás Zurita (ITA); 7–5, 6–3	Simone Cremona (ITA); Antonio Luque (POR)	Carla Fernández (ESP); Nerea Guerra (ESP); 4–6, 6–1, 6–3	Ainize Santamaría (ESP); Clarinha Santos (POR)
FIP Bronze Astorga; Astorga, Spain €8,500; 26–28 June 2026	Adrián Ronco (ESP); Fran Jurado (UAE); 6–4, 6–4	Thijs Roper (NED); Willy Släryd (SWE)	Lara Arruabarrena (ESP); Ana Catarina Nogueira (POR); 6–3, 6–4	Rebeca López (ESP); Blanca Arriola (ESP)
FIP Bronze Iquique; Iquique, Chile €4,500; 26–28 June 2026	Franco dal Bianco (ARG); Máximo Maldonado (ARG); 6–3, 6–1	Juani Rubini (ARG); Fran Britos (ARG)	No women's draw	
FIP Junior (U18) Euro Cup (Teams); Porto, Portugal n/a 30 June–4 July 2026	Spain; 3–0	France	Spain; 3–0	Italy
Premier Padel P2 Bordeaux; Bordeaux, France €264,534; 30 June–5 July 2026	Agustín Tapia (ARG); Arturo Coello (ESP); 5–7, 7–6^{4}, 6–2	Alejandro Galán (ESP); Federico Chingotto (ARG)	Tamara Icardo (ESP); Claudia Jensen (ARG); 3–6, 6–1, 6–1	Gemma Triay (ESP); Delfina Brea (ARG)

=== July ===
Tournament	Men's winners	Men's runners-up	Women's winners	Women's runners-up
FIP Silver R3 Bullpadel Cup; Moira, Northern Ireland €18,000; 3–5 July 2026	Simon Vasquez (SWE); Daniel Windahl (SWE); 6–4, 6–3	Sten Richters (NED); Albin Olsson (SWE)	Letizia Manquillo (ESP); Noemí Aguilar (ESP); 6–3, 6–2	Marina Lobo (ESP); Claudia Escacena (ESP)
FIP Bronze Chieti; Chieti, Italy €10,000; 3–5 July 2026	Fabricio Parra (ARG); Juan Pablo Andrada (ARG); 7–6^{5}, 6–2	Jose Luis González (ESP); Álvaro Mélendez (ESP)	Lorena Vano (ITA); Xènia Clascà (ESP); 6–3, 6–1	Caterina Baldi (ITA); Ana Varo (ESP)
FIP Bronze Baku II; Baku, Azerbaijan €8,500; 3–5 July 2026	Gonzalo Rubio (ESP); Nacho Vilariño (UAE); 6–4, 6–2	Juan Pablo Dametto (ARG); Felipe Calleja (ESP)	Bárbara Las Heras (ESP); Daria Kucheriavaia (RUS); 2–6, 6–2, 6–3	Constança Gorito (POR); Steffi Merah (FRA)
FIP Bronze La Nucia; La Nucia, Spain €8,500; 3–5 July 2026	Facundo López (ARG); Octavio Álvarez (ARG); 6–1, 6–4	Alejandro Calvo (ESP); Exequiel Mouriño (ARG)	Brittany Dubins (USA); Anna Cortiles (ESP); 6–4, 6–1	Alba Vázquez (ESP); Cristina Rodríguez (ESP)
FISU World University Padel Championship; Málaga, Spain n/a 7–11 July 2026	Michele Brambilla (ITA); Noa Bonnefoy (ITA); 4–6, 6–3, 6–4	Matteo Platania (ITA); Simone Iacovino (ITA)	Águeda Pérez (ESP); Laura Luján (ESP); 6–2, 6–2	Ana Domínguez (ESP); Ana Sánchez (ESP)
FISU World University Padel Championship; Málaga, Spain n/a 7–11 July 2026	Mixed winners		Mixed runners-up	
FISU World University Padel Championship; Málaga, Spain n/a 7–11 July 2026	Marisol Fernández (ESP); Arnau Candelo (ESP); 6–1, 6–4		Louise Bahurel (FRA); Nathan Courrin (FRA)	
FIP Silver Alcalá de Guadaíra; Alcalá de Guadaíra, Spain €18,000; 8–11 July 2026	Flavio Abbate (ITA); Álvaro Montiel (ITA); 7–6^{5}, 3–6, 7–6^{6}	David Gala (ESP); Enzo Jensen (ITA)	Léa Godallier (FRA); Daiara Valenzuela (ARG); 6–2, 6–2	Lara Arruabarrena (ESP); Giorgia Marchetti (ITA)
FIP Silver Pingyuan; Pingyuan County, China €18,000; 9–12 July 2026	Roberto Belmont (ESP); Guillem Figuerola (ESP); 6–3, 2–6, 7–5	Julian Prins (NED); Youp de Kroon (NED)	Victoria Kurz (GER); Marcella Koek (NED); 6–2, 6–1	Camila Ramme (MEX); Kotomi Ozawa (JPN)
FIP Silver Koksijde; Koksijde, Belgium €18,000; 10–12 July 2026	Curro Cabeza (ESP); Mariano González (PAR); 6–1, 7–5	Juanlu Esbrí (ESP); Pablo García (ESP)	Helena Wyckaert (BEL); An-Sophie Mestach (BEL); 6–3, 6–3	Giulia Sussarello (ITA); Emily Stellato (ITA)
FIP Bronze Georgia; Tbilisi, Georgia €8,500; 10–12 July 2026	Pedro Meléndez (ESP); Sten Richters (NED); 7–6, 7–5	Jaume Romera (ESP); Simone Cremona (ITA)	Vilena Petrova (RUS); Vlada Kutuzova (RUS)^{7}6–7, 6–3, 7–6^{4}	Camille Sireix (FRA); Tess De Vocht (NED)
FIP Bronze Hungary; Budapest, Hungary €8,500; 10–12 July 2026	Sergio Arias (ESP); Aarón García (ESP); 6–4, 7–6^{3}	Josete Rico (ESP); Juan Cruz Forastello (ARG)	Ainize Santamaría (ESP); Natalia Molinilla (ESP); 7–5, 7–5	Janine Hemmes (NED); Aimee Gibson (GBR)
FIP Bronze Jakarta; Jakarta, Indonesia €8,500; 10–12 July 2026	Pablo Pastor (ESP); Kevin Kviatkovski (ARG); 7–6^{2}, 6–2	Diego Arredondo (MEX); Cristóbal García (ESP)	Elsa Terranova (ITA); Angelina Neizvestnaya (RUS); 6–1, 3–0^{rtd.}	Fitriani Sabatini (INA); Fitriana Sabrina (INA)
Premier Padel P1 Málaga; Málaga, Spain €479,068; 13–19 July 2026	Arturo Coello (ESP); Agustín Tapia (ARG); 6–2, 6–2	Juan Lebrón (ESP); Leandro Augsburger (ARG)	Gemma Triay (ESP); Delfina Brea (ARG); 7–5, 3–6, 7–6^{3}	Bea González (ESP); Paula Josemaría (ESP)
FIP Silver Hiscox Padel Irish Open; Dublin, Ireland €18,000; 16–19 July 2026	Pincho Fernández (ESP); Pedro Meléndez (ESP); 3–6, 7–6^{3}, 6–4	Adrián Ronco (ESP); Pepe Aliaga (ESP)	Letizia Manquillo (ESP); Noemí Aguilar (ESP); 6–2, 7–5	Catherine Rose (GBR); Aimee Gibson (GBR)
FIP Bronze A Coruña; A Coruña, Spain €10,000; 17–19 July 2026	Ferrán Insa (ESP); Iago Fuertes (ESP); 7–6^{4}, 3–6, 7–6^{7}	Pau Miñano (ESP); Boris Castro (ESP)	Carla Fernández (ESP); Nerea Guerra (ESP); 3–6, 6–4, 6–3	Claudia Ordóñez (ESP); Daniela Portilla (ESP)
FIP Bronze Dronten; Dronten, Netherlands €10,000; 17–19 July 2026	Menno Nolten (NED); Bram Meijer (NED); 4–6, 7–6^{1}, 6–4	Sten Richters (NED); Albin Olsson (SWE)	Lucía Pérez (ESP); Clarinha Santos (POR); 3–6, 6–2, 6–4	Janine Hemmes (NED); Steffie Weterings (NED)
FIP Bronze Banten; Pagedangan, Indonesia €8,500; 17–19 July 2026	Carlos Martí (ESP); Marc Bernils (ESP); 6–4, 6–1	Pablo Pastor (ESP); Kevin Kviatkovski (ARG)	Victoria Kurz (GER); Marcella Koek (NED); 6–3, 6–2	Elsa Terranova (ITA); Angelina Neizvestnaya (RUS)
FIP Silver Mimosa Open Porto; Porto, Portugal €30,000; 24–26 July 2026	Ramiro Pereyra (ARG); Coquito Zamora (ESP); 7–5, 3–6, 7–5	Clément Geens (BEL); Dylan Guichard (FRA)	Léa Godallier (FRA); Daiara Valenzuela (ARG); 7–6^{3}, 7–6^{6}	Ana Catarina Nogueira (POR); Camila Fassio (ESP)
FIP Silver Camboriú; Camboriú, Brazil €9,000; 24–26 July 2026	Facundo López (ARG); Santino Contreras (ARG); 7–5, 6–2	Santiago Rolla (ARG); Fabricio Peirón (ARG)	No women's draw	
FIP Bronze Allesvoorpadel; Lelystad, Netherlands €8,500; 24–26 July 2026	Marco Cassetta (ITA); Peio Oviedo (ARG); 6–2, 6–3	Thijs Roper (NED); João Caiano (POR)	Mónica Gómez (ESP); Lucía Peralta (ESP); 6–2, 6–2	Justine Pysson (BEL); Elyne Boeykens (BEL)
FIP Bronze Hub 4.0 Rovato; Rovato, Italy €8,500; 24–26 July 2026	Adrián Naranjo (ESP); Jaume Romera (ESP); 6–4, 6–4	Pincho Fernández (ESP); Pedro Meléndez (ESP)	Clarissa Aima (ITA); Emily Stellato (ITA); 6–2, 3–6, 6–2	Victoria Kurz (GER); Anna Ortiz (ESP)
FIP Bronze San Juan de Alicante–El Salt; Sant Joan d'Alacant, Spain €8,500; 24–26 July 2026	Alberto Gª Jiménez (ESP); Christian Medina (GBR); 6–4, 6–3	Sergio Arias (ESP); Aarón García (ESP)	Amanda López (ESP); Ariadna Cañellas (ESP); 7–5, 7–6^{10}	Lorena Vano (ITA); Carmen Castillón (ESP)
FIP Bronze Copiapó; Copiapó, Chile €4,500; 24–26 July 2026	Juan Pablo Dametto (ARG); Felipe Calleja (ARG); 6–4, 6–4	Francisco Britos (ARG); Cristóbal Martínez (CHL)	No women's draw	
FIP Bronze Camboriú; Camboriú, Brazil €4,250; 24–26 July 2026	No men's draw		Sofía Luini (ARG); Belén Mosca (ARG); 6–7, 6–2, 6–2	Vicky Vílchez (ARG); Antonella D'Angelo (ARG)
FIP Bronze Playa; Ghazala Bay, Egypt €8,500; 30 Jul.–1 Aug. 2026	Roberto Belmont (ESP); Guillem Figuerola (ESP); 6–0, 6–2	Jorrit Hazebroek (NED); Adrián Baamonde (ESP)	Ana Sánchez (ESP); Marisol Fernández (ESP); 6–2, 6–3	Elsa Terranova (ITA); Angelina Neizvestnaya (RUS)
Premier Padel P1 Pretoria; Pretoria, South Africa €479,068; 27 Jul.–2 Aug. 2026	Alejandro Galán (ESP); Federico Chingotto (ARG); 6–2, 5–7, 7–6^{7}	Fran Guerrero (ESP); Javier Leal (ESP)	Gemma Triay (ESP); Delfina Brea (ARG); 6–2, ^{5}6–7, 7–6^{4}	Claudia Fernández (ESP); Martina Calvo (ESP)
FIP Silver Slam Collbató; Collbató, Spain €18,000; 30 Jul.–2 Aug. 2026	Emilio Chamero (ESP); Arnau Ayats (UAE); 7–6^{3}, 6–1	Fran Jurado (UAE); Alejandro Gª Calahorro (ESP)	Laia Rodríguez (ESP); Noa Cánovas (ESP); 6–1, 6–4	Patricia Llaguno (ESP); Carolina Orsi (ITA)
FIP Silver Rathbones Island Padel; St Clement, Jersey, Great Britain €18,000; 31 Jul.–2 Aug. 2026	Marco Cassetta (ITA); Peio Oviedo (ARG); 6–3, 6–1	Marco Remolina (ESP); Samuel Alós (ESP)	Virginia Riera (ARG); Teresa Navarro (ESP); 6–0, 3–6, 6–3	Mónica Gómez (ESP); Lucía Peralta (ESP)
FIP Bronze Frascati; Frascati, Italy €10,000; 31 Jul.–2 Aug. 2026	Bastien Blanqué (FRA); Maxime Joris (FRA); 6–3, 3–6, 6–3	Giulio Graziotti (ITA); Simone Iacovino (ITA)	Rebeca López (ESP); Blanca Arriola (ESP); 2–6, 5–2^{rtd.}	Giulia Sussarello (ITA); Emily Stellato (ITA)
FIP Bronze Paraguay II; Ciudad del Este, Paraguay €4,250; 31 Jul.–2 Aug. 2026	Facundo López (ARG); Santino Contreras (ARG); 3–6, 7–6^{4}, 6–4	Manuel Gayone (ARG); Facundo Dehnike (PAR)	No women's draw	

=== August ===
Tournament	Men's winners	Men's runners-up	Women's winners	Women's runners-up
Premier Padel P1 London; London, Great Britain €479,068; 4–9 August 2026	Agustín Tapia (ARG); Arturo Coello (ESP); 6–3, 5–7, 7–5	Federico Chingotto (ARG); Alejandro Galán (ESP)	Claudia Fernández (ESP); Martina Calvo (ESP); 7–5, 6–3	Gemma Triay (ESP); Delfina Brea (ARG)
FIP Bronze Portimão; Portimão, Portugal €10,000; 7–9 August 2026	Pedro Araújo (POR); Pedro Graça (POR); 6–3, 6–3	Pepe Aliaga (ESP); Samuel Rivas (ESP)	Paula Ferrán (ESP); Susana Martín (ESP); 6–4, 2–6, 6–4	Brittany Dubins (USA); Clarinha Santos (POR)
FIP Silver Bali Island Sports; Dalung, Indonesia €18,000; 14–16 August 2026	Marcos González (ESP); Martín Abud (PAR); 6–1, 6–4	Miguel Morales (ESP); Borja Trujillo (ESP)	Carla Fernández (ESP); Nerea Guerra (ESP); 6–1, 4–6, 6–0	Jimena Díaz (ESP); Alba Vázquez (ESP)
FIP Bronze Padel Barcelona–El Prat; El Prat de Llobregat, Spain €8,500; 14–16 August 2026	Emilio Chamero (ESP); Arnau Ayats (UAE); 6–4, 6–4	Albert Roglán (ESP); Manuel Aragón (ESP)	Aida Martínez (ESP); Natividad López (ESP); 2–6, 7–6^{2}, 6–4	María Laura Ferreyra (ARG); Carmen Castillón (ESP)
FIP Bronze R3 Bullpadel Cup Mol; Mol, Belgium €4,250; 14–16 August 2026	Thijs Roper (NED); Willy Släryd (SWE); 6–3, 6–2	Douglas Rutgersson (SWE); Sergio Nieto (ESP)	No women's draw	
FIP Gold San Luis; San Luis Potosí, Mexico €60,000; 19–22 August 2026	Alex Chozas (ARG); Juani Rubini (ARG); 6–2, ^{3}6–7, 7–6^{3}	Álex Ruiz (ESP); Franco dal Bianco (ARG)	Lucía Martínez (ESP); Lucía Peralta (ESP); 1–6, 6–0, 6–1	Camila Ramme (MEX); Brittany Dubins (USA)
FIP Silver ESC Padel II; Espoo, Finland €18,000; 20–22 August 2026	Marc Sintes (ESP); Coquito Zamora (ESP); 6–2, 6–3	Matteo Sargolini (ITA); Bentahor Espino (ESP)	Léa Godallier (FRA); Daiara Valenzuela (ARG); 6–2, 6–0	Sandra Bellver (ESP); Alba Gallardo (ESP)
FIP Silver 3F Elettronica Porto Sant'Elpidio; Porto Sant'Elpidio, Italy €18,000; 21–23 August 2026	Gonzalo Alfonso (ARG); Valentino Libaak (ARG); 7–5, 6–0	Álvaro Cepero (ESP); Pepe Aliaga (ESP)	Alba Pérez (ESP); Lorena Vano (ITA); 3–6, 6–3, 6–2	Camila Fassio (ESP); María Laura Ferreyra (ARG)
FIP Bronze Castro; Castro, Chile €4,500; 21–23 August 2026	Santino Contreras (ARG); Fran Maier (ARG); 6–2, 6–3	Juan Manuel Lasgoity (ITA); Relis Ferreyra (ARG)	No women's draw	
Mediterranean Games; Taranto, Italy n/a 22–28 August 2026	Jose Gª Diestro (ESP); David Gala (ESP); 7–6^{6}, 6–4	Flavio Abbate (ITA); Álvaro Montiel (ITA)	Patricia Llaguno (ESP); Lucía Sainz (ESP); 6–3, 6–4	Nuria Rodríguez (ESP); Jimena Velasco (ESP)
Mediterranean Games; Taranto, Italy n/a 22–28 August 2026	Mixed winners		Mixed runners-up	
Mediterranean Games; Taranto, Italy n/a 22–28 August 2026	Pedro Araújo (POR); Sofia Araújo (POR); 6–2, 3–6, 6–3		Marco Cassetta (ITA); Giulia Dal Pozzo (ITA)	
FIP Bronze BamVolea Ciudad de la Raqueta; Madrid, Spain €10,000; 27–29 August 2026	Asier Martínez (ESP); Javier Collantes (ESP); 7–5, 6–4	Jesús Moya (ESP); Thomas Leygue (FRA)	Amanda López (ESP); Camila Fassio (ESP); 6–2, 6–0	Aida Martínez (ESP); Ana Domínguez (ESP)
FIP Gold Belgrade; Belgrade, Serbia €50,000; 26–30 August 2026	Franco Stupaczuk (ARG); Jon Sanz (ESP); 6–4, 7–5	Miguel Yanguas (ESP); Coki Nieto (ESP)	Victoria Iglesias (ESP); Lorena Rufo (ESP); 4–6, 6–1, 6–3	Alejandra Salazar (ESP); Aranzazu Osoro (ARG)
FIP Silver McAllen; McAllen, United States €18,000; 27–30 August 2026	Leonel Aguirre (ARG); Pincho Fernández (ESP); 3–6, 6–3, 6–2	Vinny Di Francesco (USA); Ivo Andenmatten (ARG)	Brittany Dubins (USA); Camila Ramme (MEX); 6–4, 6–3	Carla Fernández (ESP); Nerea Guerra (ESP)
FIP Silver Westerbork; Westerbork, Netherlands €9,000; 28–30 August 2026	No men's draw		Marta Caparrós (ESP); Águeda Pérez (ESP); 6–4, 6–3	Aimee Gibson (GBR); Eugènia Guimet (ESP)
FIP Bronze Westerbork; Westerbork, Netherlands €5,000; 28–30 August 2026	Denis Perino (ITA); Andrés Fernández (ESP); 6–3, 7–6	Sergio Arias (ESP); Javier García (ESP)	No women's draw	

=== September ===
Tournament	Men's winners	Men's runners-up	Women's winners	Women's runners-up
FIP Silver Córdoba; Córdoba, Spain €18,000; 3–5 September 2026	Jaume Romera (ESP); Felipe Calleja (ARG); 7–6^{3}, 4–6, 7–6^{2}	Leonel Aguirre (ARG); Pablo García (ESP)	Marta Caparrós (ESP); Águeda Pérez (ESP); 7–6^{7}, 7–6^{3}	Paula Ferrán (ESP); Martina Vera (ESP)
FIP Bronze Marnes II; Marnes-la-Coquette, France €8,500; 3–5 September 2026	Nacho Moragues (ESP); Timéo Fonteny (FRA); 6–2, 4–6, 6–1	Marcel Font (ESP); Alejandro Gª Calahorro (ESP)	Emily Stellato (ITA); Giulia Sussarello (ITA); 6–3, 6–3	María Portillo (ESP); Martina Parmigiani (ITA)
Premier Padel P1 Comunidad de Madrid; Madrid, Spain €479,068; 1–6 September 2026	Alejandro Galán (ESP); Federico Chingotto (ARG); 6–4, 5–7, 6–4	Miguel Yanguas (ESP); Coki Nieto (ESP)	Gemma Triay (ESP); Delfina Brea (ARG)^{5}6–7, 6–3, 6–3	Bea González (ESP); Paula Josemaría (ESP)
FIP Bronze Phoenix; Mesa, United States €6,000; 3–6 September 2026	Kevin Kviatkovski (ARG); Fabricio Parra (ARG); 6–3, 6–4	Matías Segura (USA); Lautaro Mambrini (ARG)	No women's draw	
FIP Bronze Sassuolo; Sassuolo, Italy €10,000; 4–6 September 2026	Giulio Graziotti (ITA); Simone Iacovino (ITA); 7–6^{12}, 7–5	Thijs Roper (NED); Willy Släryd (SWE)	Cristina Carrascosa (ESP); Marisol Fernández (ESP); 7–6^{3}, 4–6, 6–1	Bo Luttikhuis (NED); Janine Hemmes (NED)
FIP Bronze Paraguay III; Fernando de la Mora, Paraguay €4,250; 4–6 September 2026	Leonardo Yob (ARG); Naim Díaz (ARG); 4–6, 6–1, 6–2	Facundo Dehnike (PAR); Fabricio Peirón (ARG)	No women's draw	
FIP Silver Lisboa Racket Centre; Lisbon, Portugal €25,000; 10–12 September 2026	Pedro Araújo (POR); Pedro Graça (POR); 6–3, ^{3}6–7, 6–2	Marco Cassetta (ITA); Peio Oviedo (ARG)	Cristina Carrascosa (ESP); Marisol Fernández (ESP); 2–6, 6–2, 6–2	Giorgia Rosi (ITA); Paula Ferrán (ESP)
FIP Silver San Luis; San Luis Potosí, Mexico €10,000; 10–12 September 2026	Felipe Calleja (ARG); Mateo Álvarez (ARG); 6–4, ^{7}6–7, 6–3	Fran Maier (ARG); Thiago Pinto (ARG)	No women's draw	
Premier Padel Paris Major; Paris, France €1,044,849; 7–13 September 2026	Agustín Tapia (ARG); Arturo Coello (ESP); 6–3, 4–6, 7–6^{1}	Alejandro Galán (ESP); Federico Chingotto (ARG)	Ariana Sánchez (ESP); Andrea Ustero (ESP); 6–2, 6–0	Claudia Fernández (ESP); Martina Calvo (ESP)
FIP Gold Bucharest; Bucharest, Romania €50,000; 10–13 September 2026	David Gala (ESP); Enzo Jensen (ITA); 7–5, 7–6^{5}	Albert Roglán (ESP); Manuel Aragón (ESP)	Lucía Martínez (ESP); Letizia Manquillo (ESP); 6–2, 7–5	Araceli Martínez (ESP); Laura Luján (ESP)
FIP Silver Padel Copa Utrecht; Utrecht, Netherlands €18,000; 10–13 September 2026	Daniel Santigosa (ESP); Ramiro Valenzuela (ARG); 6–4, 7–5	Thijs Roper (NED); João Caiano (POR)	Justine Pysson (BEL); Elyne Boeykens (BEL); 6–4, 7–5	Steffie Weterings (NED); Liza Groenveld (NED)
FIP Bronze High Velocity Phuket; Choeng Thale, Thailand €8,500; 11–13 September 2026	Héctor Vázquez (ESP); Álvaro López (ESP)^{8}6–7, 6–3, 6–3	Mattia Di Bari (ITA); Andrés Calzada (ESP)	Elsa Terranova (ITA); Angelina Neizvestnaya (RUS); 7–5, 7–5	Jimena Díaz (ESP); Alba Vázquez (ESP)
FIP Bronze Shell Casablanca; Casablanca, Morocco €8,500; 11–13 September 2026	Asier Martínez (ESP); Javier Collantes (ESP); 6–4, 4–6, 7–6^{5}	Luis Oliver (ESP); Pablo Pastor (ESP)	Aimee Gibson (GBR); Eugènia Guimet (ESP); 6–4, 6–2	María Laura Ferreyra (ARG); Matilde Minelli (ITA)
FIP Gold São Paulo; São Paulo, Brazil €50,000; 17–20 September 2026	Maxi Arce (ARG); David Gala (ESP); 6–4, 6–4	Juanlu Esbrí (ESP); Jose Gª Diestro (ESP)	Raquel Eugenio (ESP); Jimena Velasco (ESP); 7–6^{5}, 6–4	Jessica Castelló (ESP); Lorena Rufo (ESP)
FIP Silver Guimarães; Guimarães, Portugal €18,000; 17–20 September 2026	Nacho Vilariño (UAE); Coquito Zamora (ESP); 7–6^{3}, 6–2	Daniel Santigosa (ESP); Ramiro Valenzuela (ARG)	Marta Barrera (ESP); Jana Montes (ESP); 7–6^{0}, 6–3	Aimee Gibson (GBR); Eugènia Guimet (ESP)
FIP Silver Nairobi B-Active; Nairobi, Kenya €18,000; 17–20 September 2026	Adrián Naranjo (ESP); Jaume Romera (ESP); 7–5, 6–2	Marcos González (ESP); Santi Pineda (ESP)	Virginia Riera (ARG); Julieta Bidahorria (ARG); 6–1, 6–4	Raquel Piltcher (BRA); Christina-Styliani Ntanou (GRE)
FIP Silver High Velocity Bangkok; Bang Talat, Thailand €18,000; 18–20 September 2026	Gonzalo Rubio (ESP); Álvaro Montiel (ITA); 6–3, 6–3	Pablo Sánchez (ESP); Nacho Archieri (ARG)	Bo Luttikhuis (NED); Janine Hemmes (NED); 6–4, 6–0	Elsa Terranova (ITA); Angelina Neizvestnaya (RUS)
FIP Silver Budapest Open II; Budapest, Hungary €18,000; 18–20 September 2026	Gonzalo Alfonso (ARG); Valentino Libaak (ARG); 6–2, 6–1	Marc Quílez (ESP); Federico Mouriño (ESP)	Marta Caparrós (ESP); Sofi Saiz (ESP); 6–1, 6–4	Marta Borrero (ESP); Teresa Navarro (ESP)
FIP Bronze SportClub Alicante; Alicante, Spain €8,500; 18–20 September 2026	Luis Oliver (ESP); Samuel Rivas (ESP); 6–4, 7–6^{1}	Mario Huete (ESP); Jaime Muñoz (ESP)	Sandra Bellver (ESP); Ana Domínguez (ESP); 7–6^{6}, 1–6, 6–3	Aida Martínez (ESP); Natividad López (ESP)
FIP Bronze QNB Cup İzmir; Bayraklı, Turkey €8,500; 18–20 September 2026	Emilio Chamero (ESP); Arnau Ayats (UAE); 7–6^{4}, 7–6^{2}	Marco Cassetta (ITA); Peio Oviedo (ARG)	Rebeca López (ESP); Catherine Rose (GBR); 6–4, 6–1	Marcella Koek (NED); Ana Varo (ESP)
South American Games; Rafaela, Argentina n/a 22–25 September 2026	Martín Abud (PAR); Facundo Dehnike (PAR); 6–4, 7–6^{5}	Santino Contreras (ARG); Nacho Piotto (ARG)	Vicky Vílchez (ARG); María Mosca (ARG); 6–2, 6–3	Kimberley Ahumada (CHL); Catalina Arancibia (CHL)
FIP Platinum Lyon; Lyon, France €130,000; 23–27 September 2026	Fran Guerrero (ESP); Javier Leal (ESP); 4–6, 6–4, 6–1	Franco Stupaczuk (ARG); Jon Sanz (ESP)	Beatriz Caldera (ESP); Carmen Goenaga (ESP); 6–1, 6–3	Martina Fassio (ARG); Águeda Pérez (ESP)
FIP Bronze DAMAC Dubai; Dubai, United Arab Emirates €12,000; 24–27 September 2026	Adrián Ronco (ESP); Julián Lacamoire (ARG)^{5}6–7, 7–6^{4}, 6–3	Pablo Sánchez (ESP); Nacho Archieri (ARG)	Angelina Neizvestnaya (RUS); Gimena Sol (ARG); 4–6, 6–2, 6–4	Constança Gorito (POR); Martina Minetti (FIN)
FIP Silver São João da Madeira; São João da Madeira, Portugal €18,000; 25–27 September 2026	Ramiro Pereyra (ARG); José Solano (ESP); 7–5, 7–6^{4}	Luciano Capra (ARG); Maxi Sánchez (ARG)	Amanda López (ESP); Camila Fassio (ESP); 3–6, 6–3, 6–2	Marina Lobo (ESP); Marta Arellano (ESP)
FIP Silver Houten; Houten, Netherlands €9,000; 25–27 September 2026	No men's draw		Virginia Riera (ARG); Julieta Bidahorria (ARG); 7–5, 6–1	Martina Parmigiani (ITA); Helena Wyckaert (BEL)
FIP Bronze Gammarth Tunisia I Gammarth, Tunisia €8,500; 25–27 September 2026	Pincho Fernández (ESP); Facundo Domínguez (ITA); 6–1, 6–1	Roberto Belmont (ESP); Guillem Figuerola (ESP)	Bárbara Las Heras (ESP); Daria Kucheriavaia (RUS); 4–6, 6–3, 6–4	Melania Merino (ESP); Ferdaous Bahri (TUN)
FIP Bronze Viña del Mar; Viña del Mar, Chile €4,500; 25–27 September 2026	Naim Díaz (ARG); Antonio Graupera (ARG); 6–4, 7–6^{10}	Manuel Gayone (ARG); Mauricio Rivero (ARG)	No women's draw	
Asian Games; Nagoya, Japan n/a 28 Sep.–3 Oct. 2026	Mashari Naif (QAT); Rashed Naif (QAT); 6–3, 6–1	Christian Chin (MYS); Aidan Yunus (MYS)	Saki Tsukamoto (JPN); Kae Tokumoto (JPN); 6–3, 6–4	Fadona Kusumawati (INA); Fitriani Sabatini (INA)
Premier Padel P2 Rotterdam; Rotterdam, Netherlands €264,534; 29 Sep.–4 Oct. 2026	Agustín Tapia (ARG); Arturo Coello (ESP); 6–3, 6–2	Franco Stupaczuk (ARG); Jon Sanz (ESP)	Ariana Sánchez (ESP); Andrea Ustero (ESP); 6–4, 6–4	Bea González (ESP); Paula Josemaría (ESP)

=== October ===
Tournament	Men's winners	Men's runners-up	Women's winners	Women's runners-up
FIP Gold Mediolanum Padel Cup Perugia; Ferriera, Italy €50,000; 1–4 October 2026	Juanlu Esbrí (ESP); Iñigo Jofre (UAE); 7–6^{7}, ^{5}6–7, 7–6^{3}	Javier Barahona (ESP); Maxi Sánchez (ARG)	Verónica Virseda (ESP); Martina Fassio (ARG); 6–3, 6–3	Raquel Eugenio (ESP); Jimena Velasco (ESP)
FIP Bronze Almeirim; Almeirim, Portugal €10,000; 2–4 October 2026	Alejandro Gª Calahorro (ESP); Iago Fuertes (ESP); 7–5, 6–2	Pedro Araújo (POR); Pedro Graça (POR)	Ana Catarina Nogueira (POR); Clarinha Santos (POR); 4–1^{rtd.}	Lorena Vano (ITA); Carmen Castillón (ESP)
FIP Bronze Pakistan I Karachi, Pakistan €8,500; 2–4 October 2026	Adrián Ronco (ESP); Julián Lacamoire (ARG); 6–3, 3–6, 6–3	Pablo Pastor (ESP); Agustín Reca (GER)	Ainize Santamaría (ESP); Gimena Sol (ARG); 6–1, 6–2	Anastasiia Ryzhova (RUS); Nika Sluzhiteleva (RUS)
FIP Bronze The Mora Tunisia II; Borj Louzir, Tunisia €8,500; 2–4 October 2026	Nacho Vilariño (UAE); Coquito Zamora (ESP); 7–6, 1–6, 6–3	Marco Cassetta (ITA); Peio Oviedo (ARG)	Marina Lobo (ESP); Carla Fernández (ESP); 6–4, 6–2	Bárbara Las Heras (ESP); Daria Kucheriavaia (RUS)
Premier Padel P2 Germany; Düsseldorf, Germany €264,534; 6–11 October 2026	Agustín Tapia (ARG); Arturo Coello (ESP); 6–2, 7–6^{5}	Franco Stupaczuk (ARG); Jon Sanz (ESP)	Claudia Fernández (ESP); Martina Calvo (ESP); 6–3, 6–0	Ariana Sánchez (ESP); Andrea Ustero (ESP)
FIP Bronze Rovigo HUB 12 Occhiobello; Occhiobello, Italy €8,500; 8–11 October 2026	Marco Cassetta (ITA); Peio Oviedo (ARG); 4–6, 6–1, 7–6^{4}	Alessandro Ferrero (ITA); Alberto Bagarello (ITA)	Anna Ortiz (ESP); María Laura Ferreyra (ARG); 6–3, 6–4	Brittany Dubins (USA); Alba Gallardo (ESP)
FIP Silver Poreč/Parenzo; Tar-Vabriga, Croatia €18,000; 9–11 October 2026	Leonel Aguirre (ARG); Pablo García (ESP); 3–6, 6–3, 6–2	Xisco Gil (ESP); Ramiro Valenzuela (ARG)	Nuria Rodríguez (ESP); Giulia Dal Pozzo (ITA); 6–4, 6–4	Julieta Bidahorria (ARG); Virginia Riera (ARG)
FIP Silver R3 Bullpadel Cup Stratford; Stratford, Great Britain €18,000; 9–11 October 2026	Javier Barahona (ESP); Nacho Piotto (ARG); 7–6^{4}, 6–3	Álvaro Cepero (ESP); Andrés Fernández (ESP)	Verónica Virseda (ESP); Martina Fassio (ARG); 6–2, 6–0	Emily Stellato (ITA); Giulia Sussarello (ITA)
FIP Bronze DBC Coffee Copenhagen; Høje-Taastrup, Denmark €12,000; 9–11 October 2026	Sten Richters (NED); Albin Olsson (SWE); 6–4, ^{5}6–7, 6–3	Asier Martínez (ESP); Javier Collantes (ESP)	Aida Martínez (ESP); Natividad López (ESP); 6–4, 5–7, 6–1	María Portillo (ESP); Xènia Clascà (ESP)
FIP Bronze Paraguay IV; Asunción, Paraguay €8,500; 9–11 October 2026	Leonardo Yob (ARG); Naim Díaz (ARG); 3–6, 7–6^{4}, 7–6^{5}	Juan Pablo Dametto (ARG); Mauricio Rivero (ARG)	Camila Ramme (MEX); Júlia Giusti (BRA); 5–7, 6–2, 6–3	Belén Mosca (ARG); Sofía Luini (ARG)
FIP Bronze Cotonou; Cotonou, Benin €8,500; 15–17 October 2026	Tonet Sans (ESP); Gustavo Nunes (POR); 7–6^{5}, 6–4	Georges Wakim (EGY); Mohamed Alami (MAR)	Mafalda Fernandes (POR); Patrícia Ribeiro (POR); 6–4, 6–4	Dora Chamli (TUN); Nela Brito (ARG)
Premier Padel P1 Milano; Milan, Italy €479,068; 12–18 October 2026	Agustín Tapia (ARG); Arturo Coello (ESP); 4–6, 6–3, 6–2	Juan Lebrón (ESP); Leandro Augsburger (ARG)	Ariana Sánchez (ESP); Andrea Ustero (ESP); 7–6^{3}, 6–3	Beatriz González (ESP); Paula Josemaría (ESP)
FIP Bronze High Velocity Cebu; Mandaue, Philippines €8,500; 15–18 October 2026	Pablo Pastor (ESP); Antonio Varo (ESP); 7–6^{3}, 4–6, 7–6^{6}	Jordi Casanova (ESP); Sergio Icardo (UAE)	Sandra Bellver (ESP); Alba Gallardo (ESP); 6–4, 6–2	Anastasiia Ryzhova (RUS); Kotomi Ozawa (JPN)
FIP Gold Ciudad de Sevilla; Seville, Spain €50,000; 16–18 October 2026	Víctor Ruiz (ESP); Facundo López (ARG); 4–6, 6–4, 6–3	Javier Barahona (ESP); Nacho Piotto (ARG)	Julieta Bidahorria (ARG); Virginia Riera (ARG); 6–2, 6–4	Lucía Sainz (ESP); Letizia Manquillo (ESP)
FIP Bronze InterPadel Open Oslo; Dal, Norway €8,500; 16–18 October 2026	Felipe Calleja (ARG); Santino Contreras (ARG); 6–2, 6–4	Thijs Roper (NED); Willy Släryd (SWE)	Lucía Pérez (ESP); Clarinha Santos (POR); 6–2, 0–6, 7–6^{5}	Brittany Dubins (USA); Ana Varo (ESP)
FIP Bronze Oeiras; Porto Salvo, Portugal €8,500; 16–18 October 2026	Pedro Araújo (POR); Pedro Graça (POR); 6–4, 6–4	Pedro Perry (POR); Pau Miñano (ESP)	Marisol Fernández (ESP); Cristina Carrascosa (ESP); 6–2, 6–0	Ana Catarina Nogueira (POR); Andrea Batlle (POR)
FIP Bronze Racourt; Alkmaar, Netherlands €8,500; 16–18 October 2026	Pedro Meléndez (ESP); Daniel Luna (ESP); 4–6, 6–4, 6–4	Matteo Sargolini (ITA); Matteo Rosingana (ITA)	Justine Pysson (BEL); Elyne Boeykens (BEL); 7–5, 6–2	Elsa Terranova (ITA); Angelina Neizvestnaya (RUS)
FIP Gold Melilla Ciudad del Deporte; Melilla, Spain €56,000; 21–24 October 2026	Lucas Bergamini (BRA); Jairo Bautista (ESP); 6–1, 6–4	Juan Tello (ARG); Maxi Arce (ARG)	Beatriz Caldera (ESP); Raquel Eugenio (ESP); 6–3, 6–4	Verónica Virseda (ESP); Martina Fassio (ARG)
FIP Bronze EWH City Padel Taunton; Taunton, Great Britain €8,500; 23–25 October 2026	Pedro Meléndez (ESP); Daniel Luna (ESP); 6–1, 4–6, 7–5	Henrique Barbosa (POR); Marco Remolina (ESP)	Paula Ferrán (ESP); Susana Martín (ESP); 6–2, 6–2	Catarina Santos (POR); Constança Gorito (POR)
FIP Bronze High Velocity Samui; Bo Phut, Thailand €8,500; 23–25 October 2026	Jordi Casanova (ESP); Sergio Icardo (UAE); 7–6^{4}, 6–1	Kevin Kviatkovski (ARG); Antonio Varo (ESP)	Elsa Terranova (ITA); Angelina Neizvestnaya (RUS); 6–1, 6–1	Chifumi Sato (JPN); Elysia Wan (MYS)
FIP Bronze QNB Cup Antalya; Kızılağaç, Turkey €8,500; 23–25 October 2026	Alberto Gª Trabanco (ESP); Luis Oliver (ESP); 6–4, 4–6, 6–3	Roberto Belmont (ESP); Guillem Figuerola (ESP)	Emily Stellato (ITA); Giulia Sussarello (ITA); 7–5, 6–1	Ana Varo (ESP); Nika Sluzhiteleva (RUS)
FIP Bronze Viña del Mar; Viña del Mar, Chile €4,500; 23–25 October 2026	Manuel Gayone (ARG); Axel Guevara (ARG); 6–1, 7–5	Geremías Caluva (ARG); Martín Zúñiga (ARG)	No women's draw	
Premier Padel Kuwait Major; Zahra, Kuwait €1,044,849; 25–31 October 2026	Arturo Coello (ESP); Agustín Tapia (ARG); 6–1, 6–1	Juan Tello (ARG); Maxi Arce (ARG)	Gemma Triay (ESP); Delfina Brea (ARG); 3–6, 6–1, 6–1	Ariana Sánchez (ESP); Andrea Ustero (ESP)
FIP Silver DAMAC Dubai II; Dubai, United Arab Emirates €20,000; 29–31 October 2026	Xisco Gil (ESP); Ramiro Valenzuela (ARG); 6–4, 6–4	Emilio Chamero (ESP); Arnau Ayats (UAE)	Anna Ortiz (ESP); María Laura Ferreyra (ARG); 6–1, 6–2	Blanca Arriola (ESP); Anastasiia Ryzhova (RUS)
FIP Gold Mediolanum Padel Cup Torino; Grugliasco, Italy €50,000; 29 Oct.–1 Nov. 2026	Javier Barahona (ESP); Nacho Piotto (ARG); 6–3, 6–3	Santi Pineda (ESP); Santino Contreras (ARG)	Amanda López (ESP); Camila Fassio (ESP); 6–4, 7–6^{3}	Julia Polo (ESP); Ana Domínguez (ESP)
FIP Bronze Cyprus III; Ayia Napa, Cyprus €8,500; 29 Oct.–1 Nov. 2026	Iago Fuertes (ESP); Alejandro Gª Calahorro (ESP); 7–5, 6–4	Héctor Vázquez (ESP); Álvaro López (ESP)	Constança Gorito (POR); Maria Garin (POR); 7–5, 6–4	Camille Sireix (FRA); Julie Razafindranaly (FRA)
FIP Bronze High Velocity Phangan; Ko Pha-ngan, Thailand €8,500; 30 Oct.–1 Nov. 2026	Pablo Pastor (ESP); Marc Bernils (ESP); 7–6^{4}, 6–4	Jordi Casanova (ESP); Antonio Varo (ESP)	Sandra Bellver (ESP); Alba Gallardo (ESP); 6–1, 6–1	Elsa Terranova (ITA); Angelina Neizvestnaya (RUS)
FIP Bronze JC Ferrero Academy; Villena, Spain €8,500; 30 Oct.–1 Nov. 2026	Agustín Gutiérrez (ARG); Salva Oria (ESP); 6–2, 6–3	Pablo Reina (ESP); Miguel Morales (ESP)	María Delgado (ESP); Mar Munera (ESP); 6–4, 4–6, 6–4	Paula Ferrán (ESP); Susana Martín (ESP)
FIP Bronze Tashkent; Tashkent, Uzbekistan €8,500; 30 Oct.–1 Nov. 2026	Alberto Gª Jiménez (ESP); Christian Medina (GBR); 6–3, 6–1	Renzo Núñez (ARG); Gustavo Nunes (POR)	Vilena Petrova (RUS); Vlada Kutuzova (RUS); 6–3, 6–4	Ainize Santamaría (ESP); Ana Varo (ESP)

=== November ===
Tournament	Men's winners	Men's runners-up	Women's winners	Women's runners-up
FIP World Cup – Teams; Doha, Qatar n/a 2–7 November 2026	Spain; 2–1	Argentina	Spain; 2–0	Argentina
FIP Bronze ESC Padel; Espoo, Finland €8,500; 5–7 November 2026	Alberto Gª Jiménez (ESP); Christian Medina (GBR); 6–4, 7–5	Eneko Arija (ESP); Daniel Martínez (ESP)	Daiara Valenzuela (ARG); Ana Domínguez (ESP); 6–3, 6–1	Giorgia Rosi (ITA); María Delgado (ESP)
FIP Silver Women's Padel Crossroads Maldives; South Malé Atoll, Maldives €9,000; 4–8 November 2026	No men's draw		Nuria Rodríguez (ESP); Marta Talaván (ESP); 6–2, 6–2	Carla Fernández (ESP); Nerea Guerra (ESP)
FIP Bronze Cyprus IV; Ayia Napa, Cyprus €8,500; 6–8 November 2026	Jose Luis González (ESP); Javi Ruiz (ESP); 6–3, 7–6^{3}	Sergio Arias (ESP); Javi Núñez (ESP)	Paula Ferrán (ESP); Claudia Ordóñez (ESP); 7–6^{5}, 7–5	Daniela Portilla (ESP); Martina Vera (ESP)
FIP Junior Asia Padel Cup; Jakarta, Indonesia n/a 7–14 November 2025	Iran; 2–1	Kuwait	Japan; 2–0	Indonesia
FIP Junior America Padel Cup; Cancún, Mexico n/a 10–14 November 2025	Argentina; 2–1	Paraguay	Argentina; 2–0	Brazil
Premier Padel P1 Emaar Dubai; Dubai, United Arab Emirates €479,068; 10–15 November 2026	Juan Lebrón (ESP); Leandro Augsburger (ARG); 7–6^{5}, 5–7, 6–3	Gonzalo Alfonso (ARG); Valentino Libaak (ARG)	Claudia Fernández (ESP); Martina Calvo (ESP); 7–5, 6–1	Beatriz González (ESP); Paula Josemaría (ESP)
FIP Silver Mediolanum Padel Cup; Como, Italy €20,000; 12–15 November 2026	Iago Fuertes (ESP); Alejandro Gª Calahorro (ESP); 4–6, 7–6^{2}, 6–4	Jose Jiménez (ESP); Víctor Mena (ESP)	Emily Stellato (ITA); Giulia Sussarello (ITA); 6–3, 6–7, 6–3	Lorena Vano (ITA); Carmen Castillón (ESP)
FIP Bronze High Velocity Kochi; Kochi, India €4,250; 12–15 November 2026	Borja Trujillo (ESP); Kevin Kviatkovski (ARG); 6–3, 7–6^{2}	Alberto Gª Jiménez (ESP); Christian Medina (GBR)	No women's draw	
FIP Bronze Qatar II; Doha, Qatar €8,500; 13–15 November 2026	Pedro Meléndez (ESP); Daniel Luna (ESP); 4–6, 6–1, 6–1	Vinny Di Francesco (USA); Matías Segura (USA)	Elsa Terranova (ITA); Angelina Neizvestnaya (RUS); 6–4, 6–4	Lucía Pérez (ESP); Clarinha Santos (POR)
FIP Bronze Levante; Nola, Italy €8,500; 13–15 November 2026	Mario Ortega (ESP); Adam Axelsson (SWE); 6–4, 6–4	Ferrán Insa (ESP); Marcel Font (ESP)	Teresa Moríñigo (ESP); Natalia Molinilla (ESP); 2–6, 6–3, 2–1^{rtd.}	Marcella Koek (NED); Ana Sánchez (ESP)
FIP Platinum Aguascalientes; Pocitos, Mexico €120,000; 17–21 November 2026	Lucas Bergamini (BRA); David Gala (ESP); 6–4, 6–2	Edu Alonso (ESP); Aimar Goñi (ESP)	Claudia Jensen (ARG); Aranzazu Osoro (ARG); 1–6, 7–5, 7–5	Jessica Castelló (ESP); Laia Rodríguez (ESP)
FIP Bronze Skurup; Skurup, Sweden €8,500; 19–21 November 2026	Simon Vasquez (SWE); Daniel Windahl (SWE); 6–2, 6–2	Douglas Rutgersson (SWE); Simon Yitbarek (SWE)	Amanda López (ESP); Camila Fassio (ESP)^{4}6–7, 6–1, 4–0^{rtd.}	Caterina Baldi (ITA); Clarissa Aima (ITA)
FIP Silver GO PARK Hong Kong; Ma On Shan, Hong Kong €18,000; 20–22 November 2026	Sergio Icardo (UAE); Fran Jurado (UAE); 6–3, 7–6^{4}	Alberto Gª Jiménez (ESP); Christian Medina (GBR)	Lucía Pérez (ESP); Clarinha Santos (POR); 1–6, 7–6^{5}, 6–3	Aimee Gibson (GBR); Janine Hemmes (NED)
FIP Silver MCV Padelness; Naples, Italy €20,000; 20–22 November 2026	Pedro Meléndez (ESP); Daniel Luna (ESP); 7–6^{4}, 6–4	Mario Ortega (ESP); Adam Axelsson (SWE)	Emily Stellato (ITA); Giulia Sussarello (ITA); 2–6, 6–1, 6–0	Teresa Moríñigo (ESP); Natalia Molinilla (ESP)
FIP Bronze Padelko; Iurreta, Spain €11,000; 20–22 November 2026	Pau Miñano (ESP); Pedro Perry (POR); 7–5, 3–6, 6–2	Roberto Belmont (ESP); Alejandro Gª Calahorro (ESP)	Daniela Portilla (ESP); Martina Vera (ESP); 6–3, 6–3	Aitana Solán (ESP); Amaia Arteta (ESP)
FIP Bronze S2 Accra; Accra, Ghana €8,500; 20–22 November 2026	Guillem Figuerola (ESP); Adrián Ronco (ESP); 6–4, 6–1	Georges Wakim (EGY); Mohamed Alami (MAR)	Christina-Styliani Ntanou (GRE); Cayetana Sánchez (ESP); 6–3, 6–4	Camille Sireix (FRA); Tess De Vocht (NED)
FIP Bronze PayPak Karachi II; Karachi, Pakistan €8,500; 20–22 November 2026	Antonio Varo (ESP); Kevin Kviatkovski (ARG); 3–6, 6–3, 6–4	Miguel Melero (ESP); Jordi Casanova (ESP)	Dora Chamli (TUN); Nela Brito (ARG); 4–6, 7–5, 6–3	Eugènia Guimet (ESP); Anastasiia Ryzhova (RUS)
FIP Bronze Rochefort; Rochefort, Belgium €4,500; 20–22 November 2026	Nathan Courrin (FRA); Yanis Muesser (FRA); 1–6, 6–3, 7–5	Youp de Kroon (NED); Julian Prins (NED)	No women's draw	
FIP Bronze San Antonio; San Juan de Llolleo, Chile €4,500; 20–22 November 2026	Leonardo Yob (ARG); Naim Díaz (ARG)^{4}6–7, 6–3, 6–2	Mateo Rivero (ARG); Teo Gamondi (ARG)	No women's draw	
Premier Padel Mexico Major; Acapulco, Mexico €1,044,849; 24–29 November 2026	[[ ]] (25x17px) [[ ]] (25x17px)	[[ ]] (25x17px) [[ ]] (25x17px)	[[ ]] (25x17px) [[ ]] (25x17px)	[[ ]] (25x17px) [[ ]] (25x17px)
FIP Silver Roeselare; Rumbeke, Belgium €9,000; 27–29 November 2026	[[ ]] (25x17px) [[ ]] (25x17px)	[[ ]] (25x17px) [[ ]] (25x17px)	No women's draw	
FIP Bronze High Velocity Phuket; Si Sunthon, Thailand €8,500; 27–29 November 2026	[[ ]] (25x17px) [[ ]] (25x17px)	[[ ]] (25x17px) [[ ]] (25x17px)	[[ ]] (25x17px) [[ ]] (25x17px)	[[ ]] (25x17px) [[ ]] (25x17px)
FIP Bronze Roeselare; Rumbeke, Belgium €4,250; 27–29 November 2026	No men's draw		[[ ]] (25x17px) [[ ]] (25x17px)	[[ ]] (25x17px) [[ ]] (25x17px)

== Statistical information ==
=== Titles won by player (men's) ===
Total	Player	Premier Padel	Platinum	Gold	Silver	Bronze
13	Arturo Coello (ESP)	●●●●●●●●●●●●●				
13	Agustín Tapia (ARG)	●●●●●●●●●●●●●				
8	Daniel Luna (ESP)				●	●●●●●●●
7	Federico Chingotto (ARG)	●●●●●●●				
7	Alejandro Galán (ESP)	●●●●●●●				
6	Facundo López (ARG)			●●	●	●●●
6	Marcos González (ESP)				●●●●●	●
6	Felipe Calleja (ARG)				●●●	●●●
6	Álvaro Montiel (ITA)				●●●	●●●
6	Jaume Romera (ESP)				●●●	●●●
6	Pedro Meléndez (ESP)				●●	●●●●
6	Nacho Vilariño (UAE)				●●	●●●●
6	Santino Contreras (ARG)				●	●●●●●
5	Valentino Libaak (ARG)				●●●●●	
5	Gonzalo Rubio (ESP)				●●●	●●
5	Daniel Santigosa (ESP)				●●●	●●
5	Marc Sintes (ESP)				●●●	●●
5	Flavio Abbate (ITA)				●●	●●●
5	Ramiro Pereyra (ARG)				●●	●●●
5	Iago Fuertes (ESP)				●	●●●●
5	Jose Luis González (ESP)				●	●●●●
5	Adrián Naranjo (ESP)				●	●●●●
5	Naim Díaz (ARG)					●●●●●
4	David Gala (ESP)		●	●●	●	
4	Alex Chozas (ARG)			●	●●●	
4	Víctor Mena (ESP)				●●●	●
4	Coquito Zamora (ESP)				●●●	●
4	Pincho Fernández (ESP)				●●	●●
4	Pedro Araújo (POR)				●	●●●
4	Marco Cassetta (ITA)				●	●●●
4	Emilio Chamero (ESP)				●	●●●
4	Pedro Graça (POR)				●	●●●
4	Sergio Icardo (UAE)				●	●●●
4	José Solano (ESP)				●	●●●
4	Juani de Pascual (ARG)					●●●●
4	Kevin Kviatkovski (ARG)					●●●●
4	Pablo Pastor (ESP)					●●●●
4	Adrián Ronco (ESP)					●●●●
4	Leonardo Yob (ARG)					●●●●
3	Fran Guerrero (ESP)		●●		●	
3	Javier Leal (ESP)		●●		●	
3	Lucas Bergamini (BRA)		●	●●		
3	Nacho Piotto (ARG)			●	●●	
3	Julián Lacamoire (ARG)			●		●●
3	Javi García (ESP)				●●	●
3	Jose Jiménez (ESP)				●●	●
3	Arnau Ayats (UAE)				●	●●
3	Jordi Casanova (ESP)				●	●●
3	Juan Pablo Dametto (ARG)				●	●●
3	Guillem Figuerola (ESP)				●	●●
3	Alejandro Gª Calahorro (ESP)				●	●●
3	Fran Jurado (UAE)				●	●●
3	Peio Oviedo (ARG)				●	●●
3	Sergio Arias (ESP)					●●●
3	Franco dal Bianco (ARG)					●●●
3	Aarón García (ESP)					●●●
3	Alberto Gª Jiménez (ESP)					●●●
3	Christian Medina (GBR)					●●●
3	Miguel Melero (ESP)					●●●
3	Luis Oliver (ESP)					●●●
3	Pablo Reina (ESP)					●●●
3	Sten Richters (NED)					●●●
3	Pablo Sánchez (ESP)					●●●
3	Antonio Varo (ESP)					●●●
3	Héctor Vázquez (ESP)					●●●
3	Nicolás Zurita (ITA)					●●●
2	Leandro Augsburger (ARG)	●●				
2	Juan Lebrón (ESP)	●●				
2	Maxi Arce (ARG)		●	●		
2	Franco Stupaczuk (ARG)		●	●		
2	Juanlu Esbrí (ESP)			●●		
2	Javier Barahona (ESP)			●	●	
2	Enzo Jensen (ITA)			●	●	
2	Iñigo Jofre (UAE)			●	●	
2	Martín Abud (PAR)				●●	
2	Leonel Aguirre (ARG)				●●	
2	Gonzalo Alfonso (ARG)				●●	
2	Guillermo Collado (ESP)				●●	
2	Pol Hernández (ESP)				●●	
2	Ramiro Valenzuela (ARG)				●●	
2	Roberto Belmont (ESP)				●	●
2	Curro Cabeza (ESP)				●	●
2	Rodrigo Coello (ESP)				●	●
2	Mario del Castillo (ESP)				●	●
2	Clément Geens (BEL)				●	●
2	Mariano González (PAR)				●	●
2	Dylan Guichard (FRA)				●	●
2	Máximo Maldonado (ARG)				●	●
2	Álvaro Mélendez (ESP)				●	●
2	Javi Ruiz (ESP)				●	●
2	Simon Vasquez (SWE)				●	●
2	Daniel Windahl (SWE)				●	●
2	Marc Bernils (ESP)					●●
2	Javier Collantes (ESP)					●●
2	Youp de Kroon (NED)					●●
2	Andrés Fernández (ESP)					●●
2	Timéo Fonteny (FRA)					●●
2	Alberto Gª Trabanco (ESP)					●●
2	Ferrán Insa (ESP)					●●
2	Maxime Joris (FRA)					●●
2	Asier Martínez (ESP)					●●
2	Nacho Moragues (ESP)					●●
2	Albin Olsson (SWE)					●●
2	Fabricio Parra (ARG)					●●
2	Pedro Perry (POR)					●●
2	Julian Prins (NED)					●●
2	Samuel Rivas (ESP)					●●
2	Alonso Rodríguez (ESP)					●●
2	Borja Trujillo (ESP)					●●
1	Juan Tello (ARG)		●			
1	Miguel Yanguas (ESP)		●			
1	Jairo Bautista (ESP)			●		
1	Martín di Nenno (ARG)			●		
1	Javi Garrido (ESP)			●		
1	Momo González (ESP)			●		
1	Juani Rubini (ARG)			●		
1	Álex Ruiz (ESP)			●		
1	Víctor Ruiz (ESP)			●		
1	Jon Sanz (ESP)			●		
1	Mateo Álvarez (ARG)				●	
1	Nacho Archieri (ARG)				●	
1	Alex Arroyo (ESP)				●	
1	Pablo García (ESP)				●	
1	Xisco Gil (ESP)				●	
1	Luis Hernández (ESP)				●	
1	Javier Martínez (ESP)				●	
1	Miguel Morales (ESP)				●	
1	Luciano Puppo (ARG)				●	
1	Alfonso Sánchez (ESP)				●	
1	Octavio Álvarez (ARG)					●
1	Juan Pablo Andrada (ARG)					●
1	Daniel Appelgren (SWE)					●
1	Adam Axelsson (SWE)					●
1	Johan Bergeron (FRA)					●
1	Bastien Blanqué (FRA)					●
1	Toni Bueno (ESP)					●
1	João Caiano (POR)					●
1	Marcos Córdoba (ESP)					●
1	Nathan Courrin (FRA)					●
1	Simone Cremona (ITA)					●
1	Juan Cruz Forastello (ARG)					●
1	Facundo Dehnike (PAR)					●
1	Nuno Deus (POR)					●
1	Mattia Di Bari (ITA)					●
1	Facundo Domínguez (ITA)					●
1	Giuseppe Fino (ITA)					●
1	Diego García (ESP)					●
1	Alberto Gasca (ESP)					●
1	Manuel Gayone (ARG)					●
1	Enrique Goenaga (ESP)					●
1	Antonio Graupera (ARG)					●
1	Giulio Graziotti (ITA)					●
1	Axel Guevara (ARG)					●
1	Agustín Gutiérrez (ARG)					●
1	Olivier Guy de Chamisso (FRA)					●
1	Simone Iacovino (ITA)					●
1	Álvaro López (ESP)					●
1	Antonio Luque (POR)					●
1	Fran Maier (ARG)					●
1	Adrián Marqués (ESP)					●
1	Carlos Martí (ESP)					●
1	Bram Meijer (NED)					●
1	Pau Miñano (ESP)					●
1	Yanis Muesser (FRA)					●
1	Sergio Nieto (ESP)					●
1	Menno Nolten (NED)					●
1	Gustavo Nunes (POR)					●
1	Renzo Núñez (ARG)					●
1	Joel Olivera (ESP)					●
1	Salva Oria (ESP)					●
1	Mario Ortega (ESP)					●
1	Aris Patiniotis (ITA)					●
1	Denis Perino (ITA)					●
1	Santi Pineda (ESP)					●
1	Josete Rico (ESP)					●
1	Jérémy Robert (FRA)					●
1	Albert Roglán (ESP)					●
1	Thijs Roper (NED)					●
1	Matteo Rosingana (ITA)					●
1	Douglas Rutgersson (SWE)					●
1	Tonet Sans (ESP)					●
1	Julien Seurin (FRA)					●
1	Willy Släryd (SWE)					●
1	Agustín Torre (ARG)					●
1	Albert Trillas (ESP)					●
1	Alex Urzola (ESP)					●
1	Javier Valdés (CHL)					●
1	Manuel Vives (FRA)					●

=== Titles won by nation (men's) ===
Total	Nation	Premier Padel	Platinum	Gold	Silver	Bronze
159	Spain (ESP)	●●●●●●●●●●●●●●●●●●●●●●	●●●●	●●●●●●●●●●	●●●●●●●●●●●●●●●●●●●●●●●●●●●●●●●●●●●●●●●●	●●●●●●●●●●●●●●●●●●●●●●●●●●●●●●●●●●●●●●●●●●●●●●●●●●●●●●●●●●●●●●●●●●●●●●●●●●●●●●●●●●●
87	Argentina (ARG)	●●●●●●●●●●●●●●●●●●●●●●	●●	●●●●●●●●	●●●●●●●●●●●●●●●●●●●●	●●●●●●●●●●●●●●●●●●●●●●●●●●●●●●●●●●●
22	Italy (ITA)			●	●●●●●	●●●●●●●●●●●●●●●●
13	United Arab Emirates (UAE)			●	●●●●	●●●●●●●●
9	France (FRA)				●	●●●●●●●●
8	Portugal (POR)				●	●●●●●●●
7	Sweden (SWE)				●	●●●●●●
7	Netherlands (NED)					●●●●●●●
5	Paraguay (PAR)				●●●	●●
3	Great Britain (GBR)					●●●
2	Belgium (BEL)				●	●
1	Brazil (BRA)			●		
1	Chile (CHL)					●

=== Titles won by player (women's) ===
Total	Player	Premier Padel	Platinum	Gold	Silver	Bronze
8	Virginia Riera (ARG)			●	●●●●●	●●
7	Delfina Brea (ARG)	●●●●●●●				
7	Gemma Triay (ESP)	●●●●●●●				
7	Raquel Eugenio (ESP)		●	●●	●●●●	
7	Daiara Valenzuela (ARG)				●●●●	●●●
7	Carla Fernández (ESP)				●●	●●●●●
7	Camila Ramme (MEX)				●●	●●●●●
6	Bea González (ESP)	●●●●●●				
6	Paula Josemaría (ESP)	●●●●●●				
6	Martina Fassio (ARG)			●●	●●●●	
6	Letizia Manquillo (ESP)			●	●●●●	●
6	Amanda López (ESP)			●	●	●●●●
6	Nerea Guerra (ESP)				●●	●●●●
6	Emily Stellato (ITA)				●●	●●●●
6	Sandra Bellver (ESP)					●●●●●●
5	Ariana Sánchez (ESP)	●●●●●				
5	Andrea Ustero (ESP)	●●●●●				
5	Camila Fassio (ESP)			●	●	●●●
5	Léa Godallier (FRA)				●●●●	●
5	Noemí Aguilar (ESP)				●●●	●●
5	Brittany Dubins (USA)				●●	●●●
5	Lucía Pérez (ESP)				●●	●●●
5	Giulia Sussarello (ITA)				●●	●●●
5	Claudia Escacena (ESP)				●	●●●●
5	Clarinha Santos (POR)				●	●●●●
5	Angelina Neizvestnaya (RUS)					●●●●●
4	Verónica Virseda (ESP)		●●	●	●	
4	Julieta Bidahorria (ARG)			●	●●●	
4	Laia Rodríguez (ESP)			●	●	●●
4	Lucía Peralta (ESP)			●		●●●
4	Patricia Martínez (ESP)				●●	●●
4	Teresa Navarro (ESP)				●●	●●
4	Clarissa Aima (ITA)				●	●●●
4	Cristina Carrascosa (ESP)				●	●●●
4	Marisol Fernández (ESP)				●	●●●
4	María Laura Ferreyra (ARG)				●	●●●
4	Victoria Kurz (GER)				●	●●●
4	Bárbara Las Heras (ESP)				●	●●●
4	Alba Pérez (ESP)				●	●●●
4	Julia Polo (ESP)				●	●●●
4	Paula Ferrán (ESP)					●●●●
4	Alba Gallardo (ESP)					●●●●
4	Mónica Gómez (ESP)					●●●●
4	Natividad López (ESP)					●●●●
4	Ainize Santamaría (ESP)					●●●●
4	Elsa Terranova (ITA)					●●●●
3	Martina Calvo (ESP)	●●●				
3	Claudia Fernández (ESP)	●●●				
3	Lucía Sainz (ESP)		●		●●	
3	Jimena Velasco (ESP)			●	●●	
3	Noa Cánovas (ESP)			●	●	●
3	Marta Barrera (ESP)				●●●	
3	Marta Caparrós (ESP)				●●●	
3	Jana Montes (ESP)				●●●	
3	Sofi Saiz (ESP)				●●	●
3	Lorena Vano (ITA)				●●	●
3	Caterina Baldi (ITA)				●	●●
3	Elyne Boeykens (BEL)				●	●●
3	Marcella Koek (NED)				●	●●
3	Anna Ortiz (ESP)				●	●●
3	Justine Pysson (BEL)				●	●●
3	Catherine Rose (GBR)				●	●●
3	Ana Domínguez (ESP)					●●●
3	Daria Kucheriavaia (RUS)					●●●
3	Marina Lobo (ESP)					●●●
3	Susana Martín (ESP)					●●●
3	Daniela Portilla (ESP)					●●●
2	Claudia Jensen (ARG)	●	●			
2	Marina Guinart (ESP)		●●			
2	Beatriz Caldera (ESP)		●	●		
2	Aranzazu Osoro (ARG)		●	●		
2	Victoria Iglesias (ESP)			●●		
2	Lucía Martínez (ESP)			●●		
2	Patricia Llaguno (ESP)			●	●	
2	Lorena Rufo (ESP)			●	●	
2	Laura Luján (ESP)			●		●
2	Alix Collombon (FRA)				●●	
2	Carolina Orsi (ITA)				●●	
2	Nuria Rodríguez (ESP)				●●	
2	Marta Talaván (ESP)				●●	
2	Xènia Clascà (ESP)				●	●
2	Bo Luttikhuis (NED)				●	●
2	Patricia Araus (ESP)					●●
2	Marta Arellano (ESP)					●●
2	María Delgado (ESP)					●●
2	Jimena Díaz (ESP)					●●
2	Mafalda Fernandes (POR)					●●
2	Aimee Gibson (GBR)					●●
2	Eugènia Guimet (ESP)					●●
2	Vlada Kutuzova (RUS)					●●
2	Rebeca López (ESP)					●●
2	Sofía Luini (ARG)					●●
2	Aida Martínez (ESP)					●●
2	Melani Merino (ESP)					●●
2	Natalia Molinilla (ESP)					●●
2	Belén Mosca (ARG)					●●
2	Ana Catarina Nogueira (POR)					●●
2	Claudia Ordóñez (ESP)					●●
2	Vilena Petrova (RUS)					●●
2	María Portillo (ESP)					●●
2	Manuela Schuck (BRA)					●●
2	Gimena Sol (ARG)					●●
2	Martina Vera (ESP)					●●
1	Tamara Icardo (ESP)	●				
1	Carmen Goenaga (ESP)		●			
1	Araceli Martínez (ESP)			●		
1	Jessica Castelló (ESP)				●	
1	Giulia Dal Pozzo (ITA)				●	
1	Janine Hemmes (NED)				●	
1	Carla Mesa (ESP)				●	
1	An-Sophie Mestach (BEL)				●	
1	Águeda Pérez (ESP)				●	
1	Helena Wyckaert (BEL)				●	
1	Blanca Arriola (ESP)					●
1	Lara Arruabarrena (ESP)					●
1	Louise Bahurel (FRA)					●
1	Marta Borrero (ESP)					●
1	Nela Brito (ARG)					●
1	Ariadna Cañellas (ESP)					●
1	Carlotta Casali (ITA)					●
1	Dora Chamli (TUN)					●
1	Cristina Cirne (BRA)					●
1	Anna Cortiles (ESP)					●
1	Margarida Fernandes (POR)					●
1	Maria Garin (POR)					●
1	Júlia Giusti (BRA)					●
1	Constança Gorito (POR)					●
1	Gitte Haxen (DEN)					●
1	Lucía Micaela (ESP)					●
1	Marianela Montesi (ITA)					●
1	Teresa Moríñigo (ESP)					●
1	Mar Munera (ESP)					●
1	Christina-Styliani Ntanou (GRE)					●
1	Kotomi Ozawa (JPN)					●
1	Raquel Piltcher (BRA)					●
1	Novela Putria (INA)					●
1	Maria Rasmussen (DEN)					●
1	Patrícia Ribeiro (POR)					●
1	Ana Sánchez (ESP)					●
1	Cayetana Sánchez (ESP)					●
1	Alexandra Silva (POR)					●
1	Catarina Santos (POR)					●
1	Ksenia Sharifova (AIN)					●
1	Ivet Val (ESP)					●
1	Alba Vázquez (ESP)					●

=== Titles won by nation (women's) ===
Total	Nation	Premier Padel	Platinum	Gold	Silver	Bronze
154	Spain (ESP)	●●●●●●●●●●●●●●●●●●●●●●	●●●●	●●●●●●●●●●●	●●●●●●●●●●●●●●●●●●●●●●●●●●●●●●●●●●●●●●	●●●●●●●●●●●●●●●●●●●●●●●●●●●●●●●●●●●●●●●●●●●●●●●●●●●●●●●●●●●●●●●●●●●●●●●●●●●●●●●
40	Argentina (ARG)	●●●●●●●●	●	●●●●	●●●●●●●●●●●●●●●	●●●●●●●●●●●●
21	Italy (ITA)				●●●●●●●●	●●●●●●●●●●●●●
11	Portugal (POR)				●	●●●●●●●●●●
10	Russia (RUS)					●●●●●●●●●●
8	France (FRA)				●●●●●●	●●
7	Mexico (MEX)				●●	●●●●●
5	United States (USA)				●●	●●●
5	Great Britain (GBR)				●	●●●●
4	Belgium (BEL)				●●	●●
4	Netherlands (NED)				●●	●●
4	Germany (GER)				●	●●●
4	Brazil (BRA)					●●●●
1	Denmark (DEN)					●
1	Greece (GRE)					●
1	Indonesia (INA)					●
1	Japan (JPN)					●
1	Tunisia (TUN)					●

== See also ==
- International Padel Federation
- Premier Padel
- Premier Padel 2026
