= Novela Rezha =

Indonesian padel player (born 1999)

Novela Putria
Personal information
- Full name: Novela Rezha Millenia Putria Sari
- Born: 9 November 1999 (age 26) Indonesia

Sport
- Country: Indonesia
- Sport: Padel and Tennis
- Rank: 178 (3 August 2026)
- Coached by: Panji Untung Setiawan

Achievements and titles
- Highest world ranking: 165 (2026)
- Updated on 3 August 2026

Novela Rezha Millenia Putria Sari (born 9 November 1999), commonly known as Novela Rezha and registered with the International Padel Federation under the name Novela Putria, is an Indonesian professional padel player who previously competed in tennis.

She is the highest-ranked Indonesian player in the FIP rankings and reached a career-high ranking of world No. 165 in 2026. In May 2026, she won the FIP Bronze Yogyakarta with Spanish player Sandra Bellver, becoming the first Indonesian player to win a title on the CUPRA FIP Tour.

Before competing internationally in padel, Rezha represented Indonesia in tennis at the 2021 SEA Games, where she won a bronze medal in the women's team event. She also won a silver medal in women's doubles and bronze medals in women's singles and the women's team event at 2021 National Sports Week, representing Papua. She later represented Indonesia in padel and was part of the women's national team that won the bronze medal at the 2025 FIP Asia Padel Cup.
