= Sfax =

Port city in Tunisia

Sfax صفاقس
- City
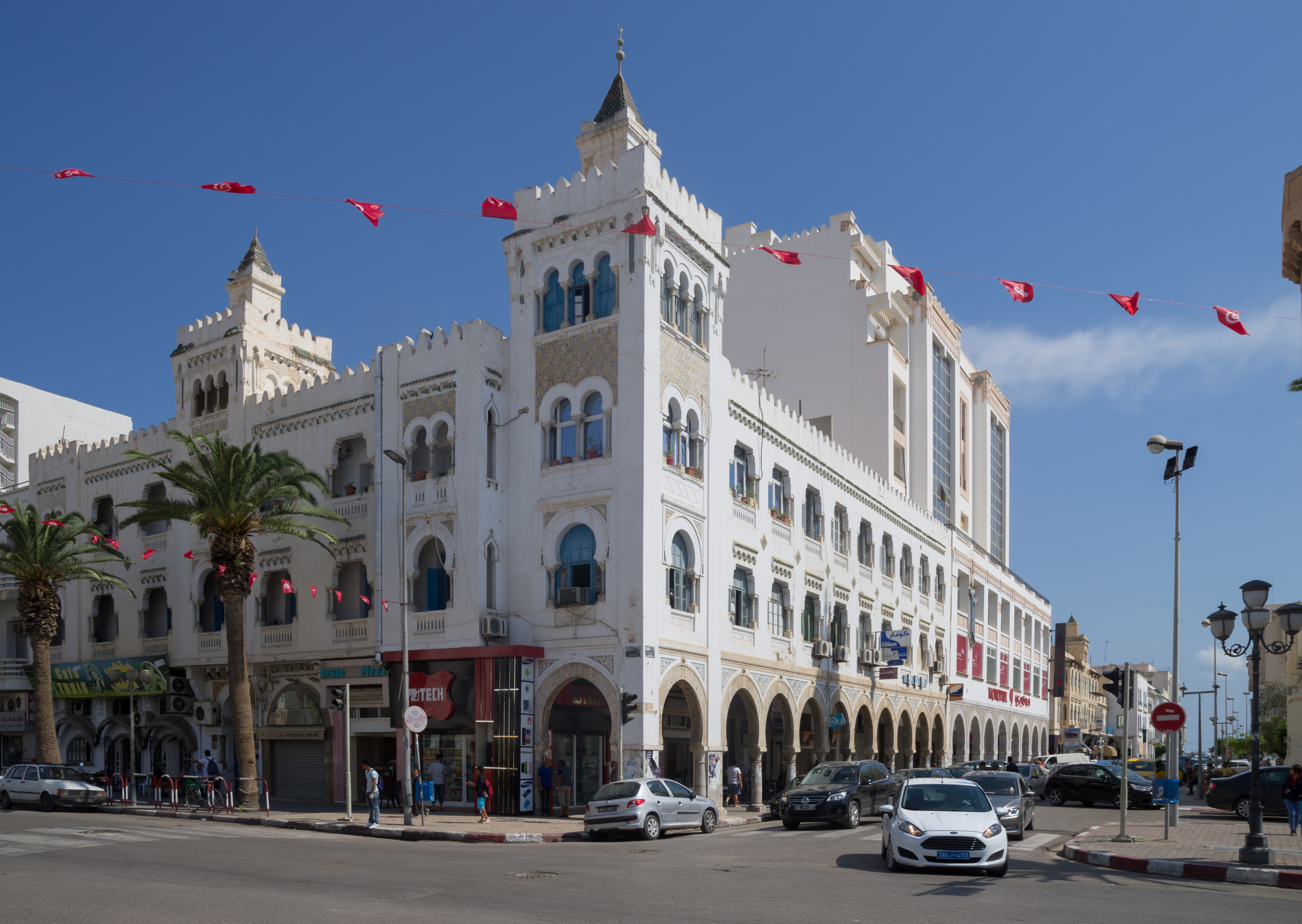
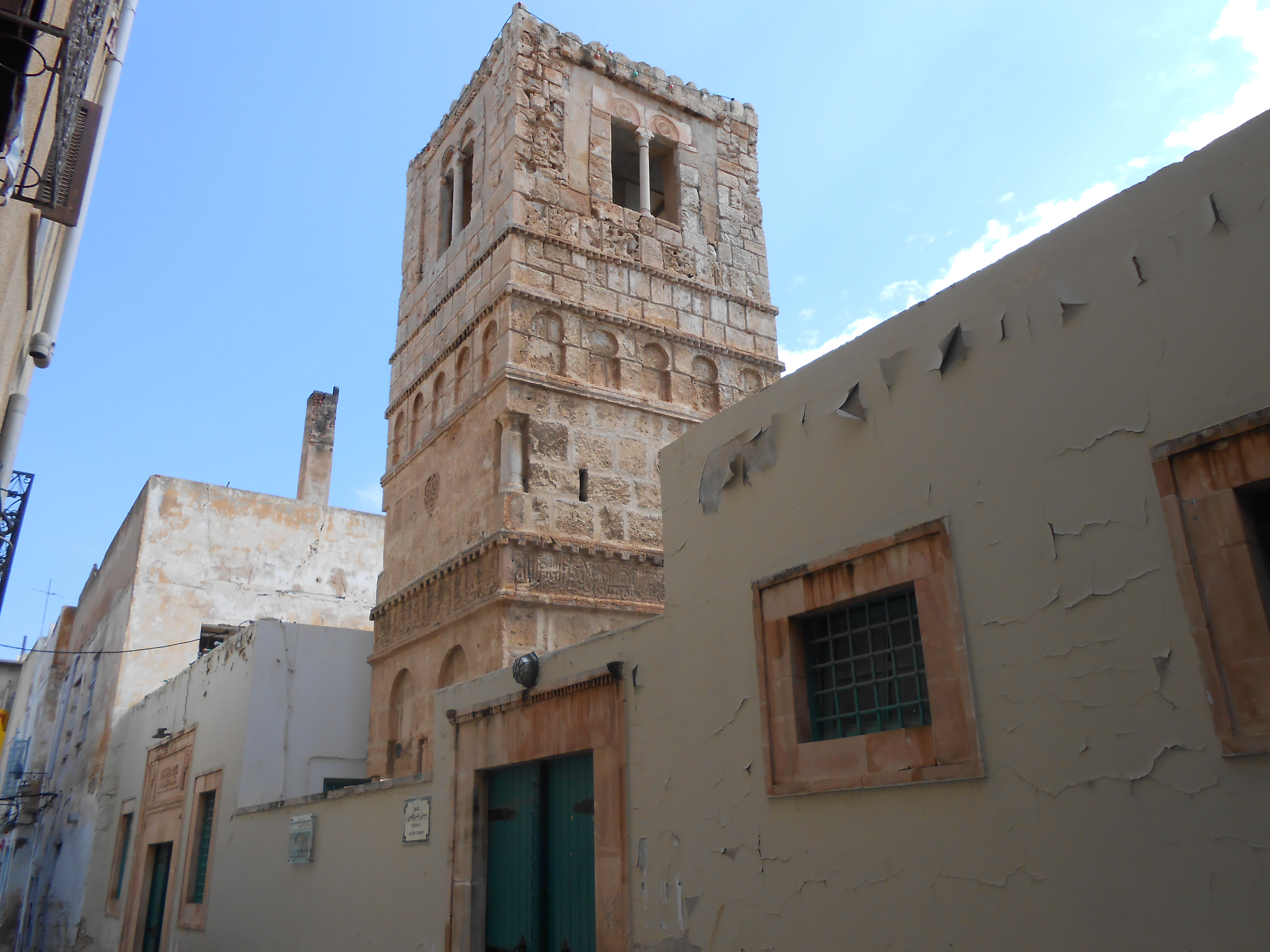
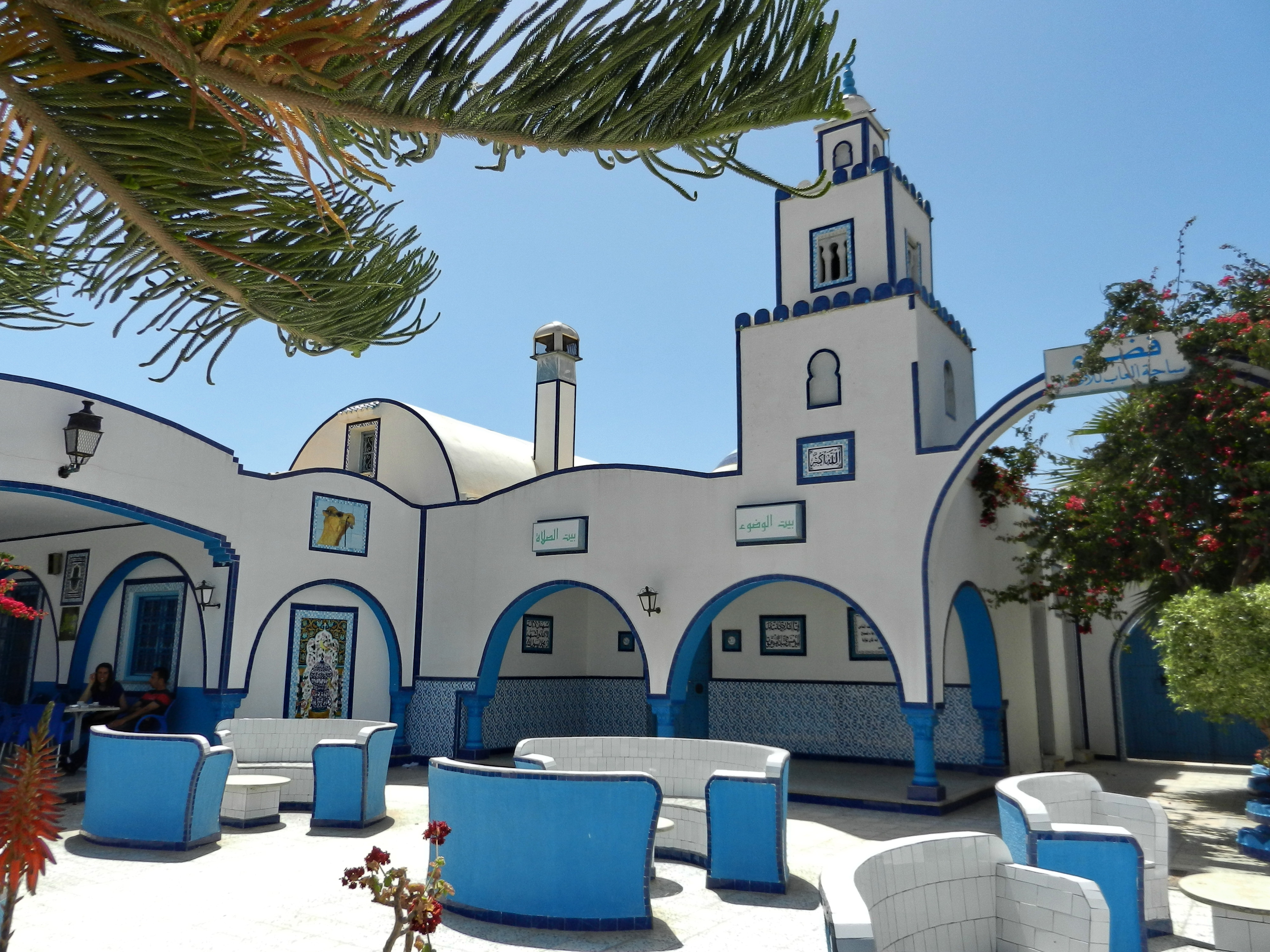
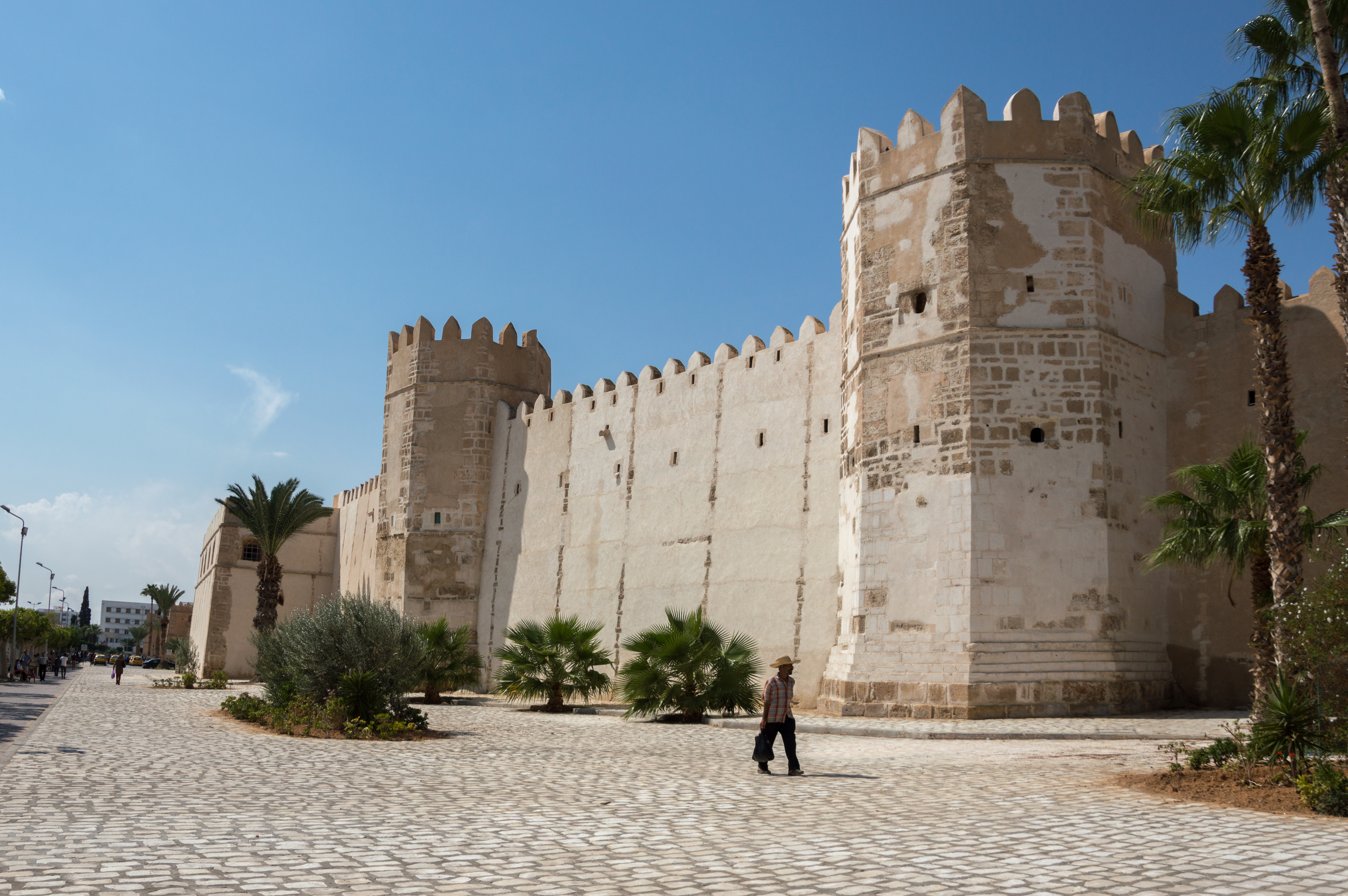
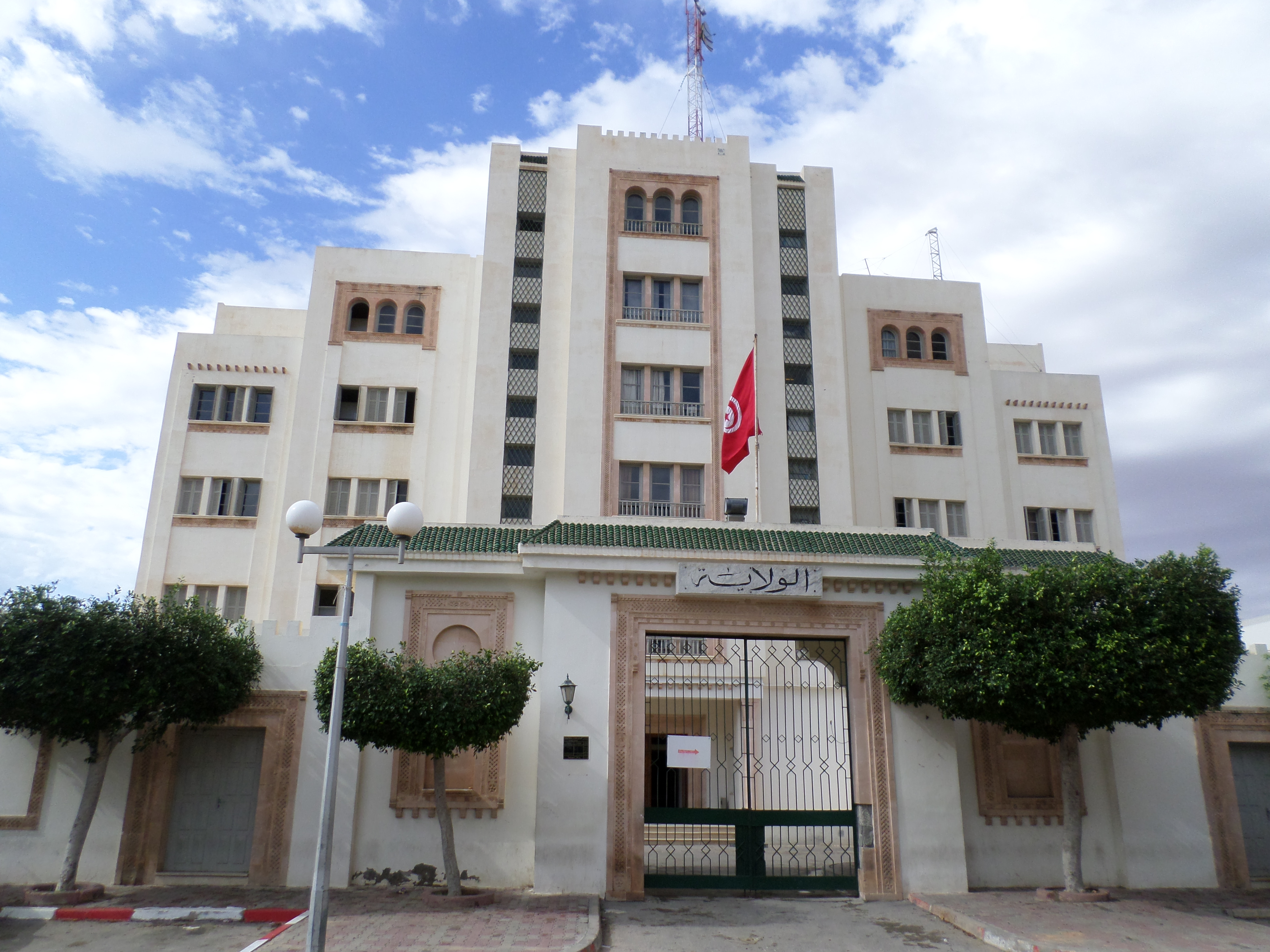
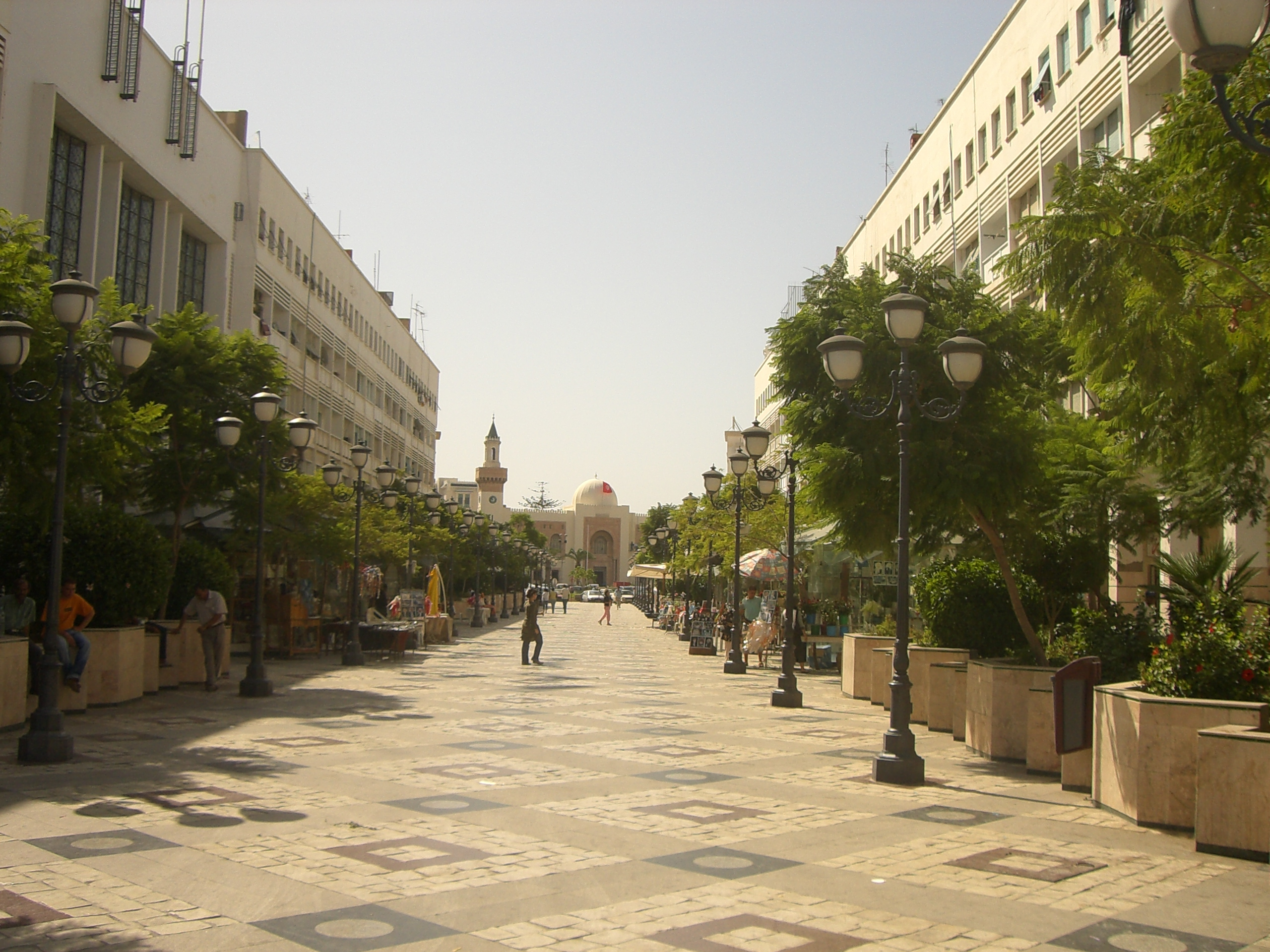
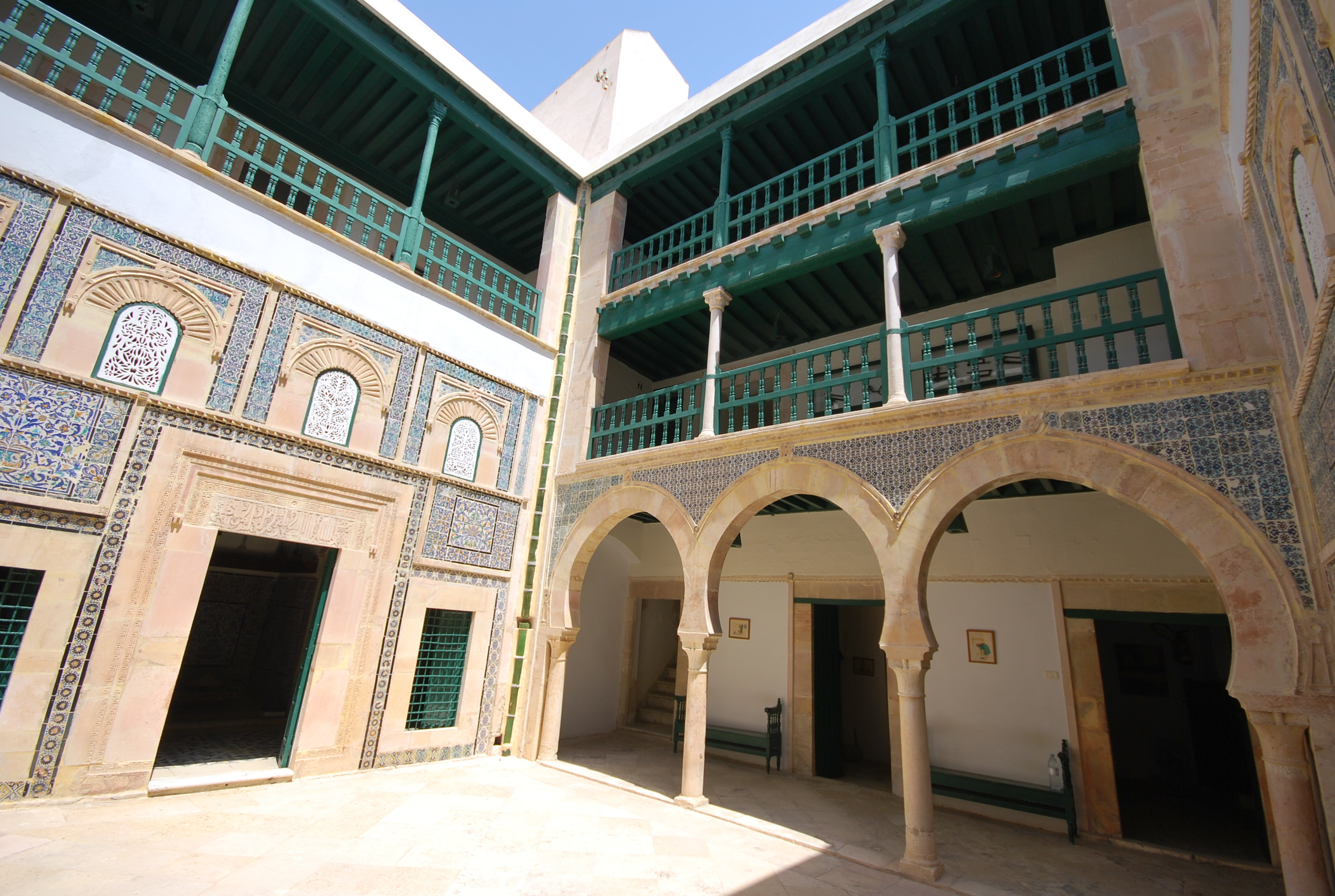
- Clockwise from top: View of Sfax from Ksar Ben Romadhane, Cafe Sidi Boussaid, Sfax Governorate headquarters, Dar Jellouli Museum, Avenue Farhat Hached, City Walls, Sidi Amor Kammoun Mosque

- Location within Tunisia
- Coordinates: 34°44′24″N 10°45′36″E
- Country: Tunisia
- Governorate: Sfax Governorate
- Delegation(s): Sfax West, Sfax South, Sfax Medina
- Established: AD 849
- Elevation: 0 m (0 ft)

Population (2022)
  - City: 341,999
  - Urban: 660,000
  - Metro: 1,018,341

GDP (PPP, constant 2015 values)
  - Year: 2024
  - Total (Urban): $8.6 billion
  - Per capita: $13,100
- Time zone: UTC+1 (CET)
  - Summer (DST): UTC+1
- Postal code: 3000

Sfax (/s(ə)ˈfæks/ s(ə-)FAKS; Arabic: صفاقس, romanized: Ṣafāqis, Tunisian Arabic pronunciation: [ˈsˤfɛːqəs]) is a major port city in Tunisia, located 270 km (170 mi) southeast of Tunis. The city, founded in AD 849 on the ruins of Taparura, is the capital of the Sfax Governorate (about 955,421 inhabitants in 2014), and a Mediterranean port. Sfax has a population of 341,999 (census 2022). Its main industries include phosphate, olive and nut processing, fishing (it is the largest fishing port in Tunisia) and international trade. The city is the second-most populous in the country after the capital, Tunis.

== History ==
=== Carthaginian and Aghlabid eras ===
Present-day Sfax was founded by the Aghlabids in AD 849 on the site of the town of Taparura. The modern city has also grown to cover some other ancient settlements, most notably Thenae in its southern suburb of Thyna.

=== Almohad era ===
By the end of the 10th century, Sfax had become an independent city-state. The city was conquered by Roger II of Sicily in 1148 and occupied until it was liberated in 1156 after a revolt and taken by the Almohads, and was briefly occupied by European forces again, this time by the Spanish, in the 16th century, before falling into Ottoman hands. Sfax became an integral base of the Barbary piracy, prompting an unsuccessful invasion by Venice in 1185.

Al-Idrisi, in the 12th century, described Sfax as:

The city of Sfax is an ancient and thriving city with many markets and extensive buildings. It is surrounded by a stone wall with fortified iron-plated gates. Along its walls, there are well-constructed watchtowers for guarding. Its markets are lively, and its people drink from cisterns. Fine fruits of astonishing variety are brought to it from the city of Gabès in sufficient quantities, making them abundant and inexpensive. A significant amount of fish is caught there, large in size and plentiful in number, mostly captured using enclosures set up in stagnant waters through various clever methods. Its main agricultural products are olives and olive oil, which are of a unique quality not found elsewhere. The city has a harbor in stagnant waters. In summary, it is one of the most distinguished cities, and its inhabitants possess pride and dignity. The great King Roger conquered it in the year 543 AH [1148 CE]. It remains inhabited today, though not as prosperous in architecture, markets, and trade as it was in ancient times.

=== Hafsid era ===
Abou Yahya Abou Bekr finally re-established Hafsid unity and recaptured Kerkennah Islands from the Christians in 1335. The peace returned to the country was only disturbed by rare episodes, the most lasting of which began with the price of Sfax by the dissident brothers, Ahmed and Abdelmalèk ben Makki.

Towards 1370, following the arrival of Caliph Abdul-Abbas, Sfax returned under the Hafsid era.

After more than three centuries, which had seen the preponderance of the Hafsids, the conflict between the Turks and the Spaniards precipitated the fall of their dynasty. In 1534, the privateer Barberousse entered Tunis, proclaimed the decline of the Hafsids and effortlessly reunited the towns of the coast, among them the town of Sfax.

=== Husseinid era ===
The founder of the new dynasty, Hussein, gave the country unquestionable economic prosperity. In Sfax, the mosque is enlarged, which regains its original extent; the new mihrâb is dated 1758, the work was completed in 1783.

The ramparts were restored and two large reservoirs were built to supplement the Nasriah cisterns. In 1776, the southern suburb of the city, the Frankish quarter, was built, reserved for Jews and Christians, a major place of maritime trade, but which was also to serve as a buffer against sea attacks, which were still to be feared. The eventuality was not long in coming, the Venetians bombarding Sfax four times in the space of two years (1785–86). A large fort was built during the siege to flank Borj Ennar; it was demolished after the last war.

Around 1830, the Frankish quarter was surrounded by a wall and in 1860 the city had a post office and telegraph. In 1876, the telegraph clerk made a plan of the city and told us about a signal tower built a century earlier and of which we have lost track.

=== French era ===
When the Bey of Tunis signed the Bardo Treaty, in 1881, making Tunisia a protectorate, an insurrection broke out in Sfax. Six ironclads were dispatched from Toulon (Colbert, Friedland, Marengo, Trident, Revanche, Surveillante) to join the French Navy ships in Tunisian waters. In Sfax, three ironclads from the Division of the Levant were already present (Alma, Reine Blanche, La Galissonnière), together with four cannon boats. Sfax was bombarded, and on 16 July the city was taken by the French after hard fighting, with seven dead and 32 wounded for the French.

=== World War II ===
During World War II, the Axis powers used the city as a major base until British forces took it on 10 April 1943. After World War II, Tunisia was returned to France, but gained independence in 1956.

historical images

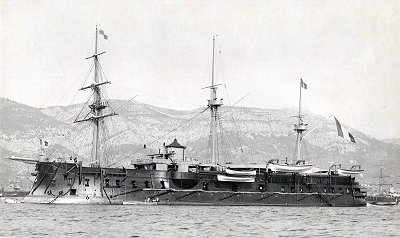
The French ironclad Colbert which bombarded Sfax (1881)

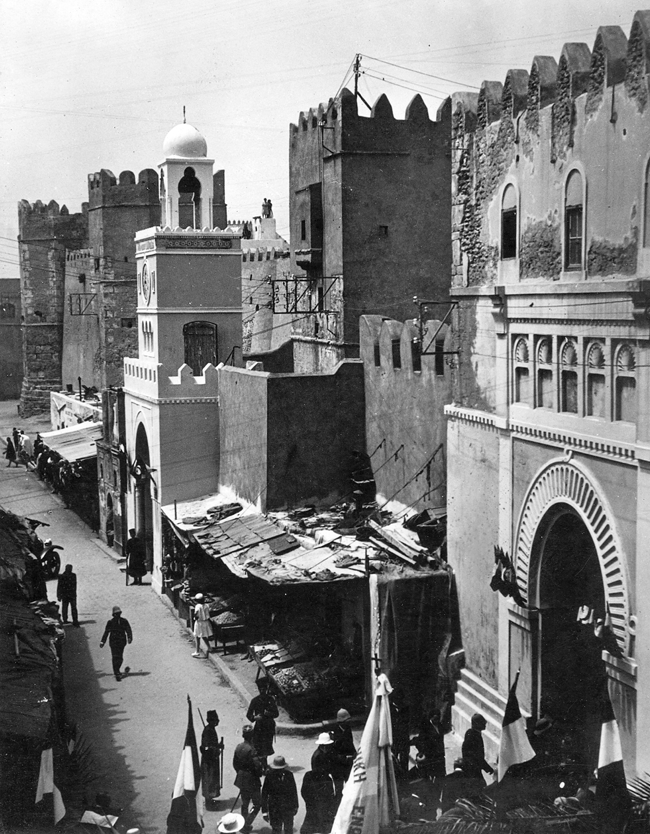
Bab Diwan (1890)

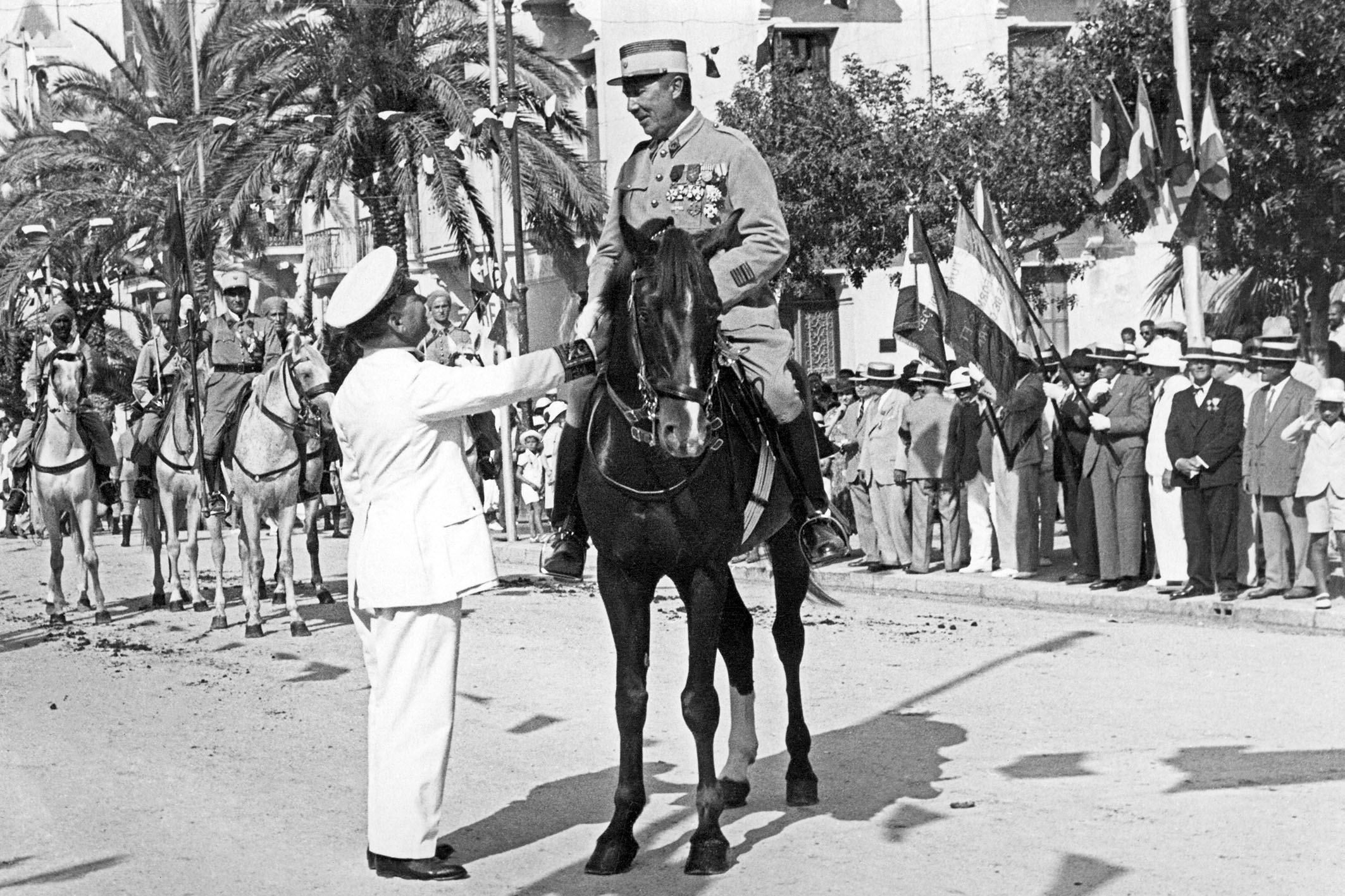
Colonel Bougrain and Léon Beaufils in Sfax (1934)

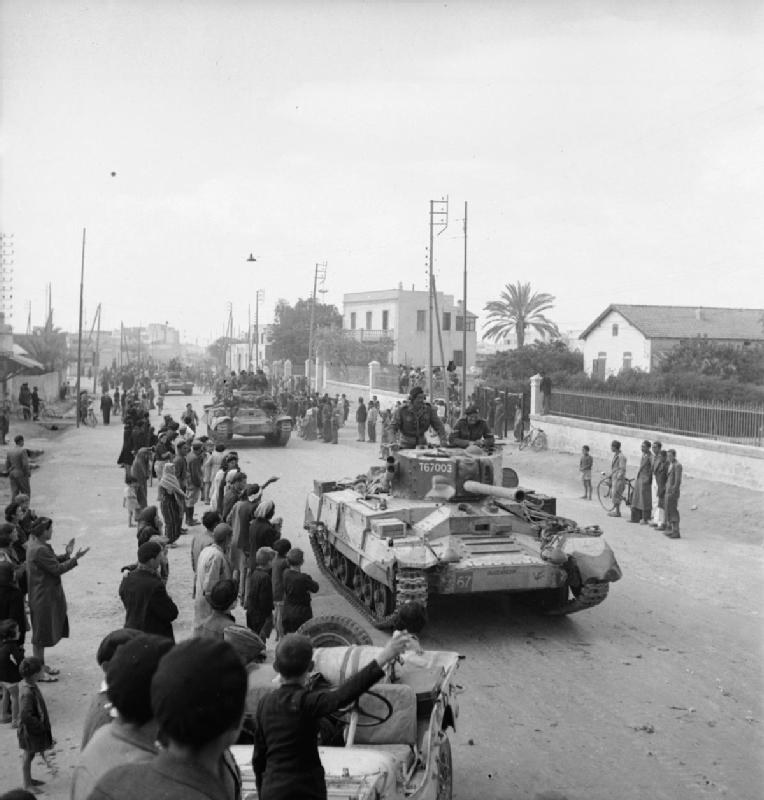
British Army in Tunisia (1943)

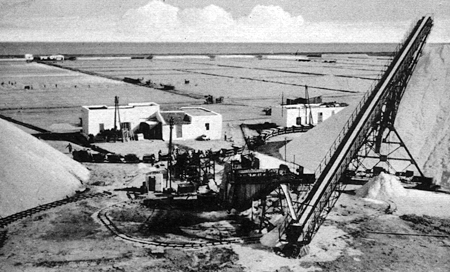
Les Salines of Sfax (1910)

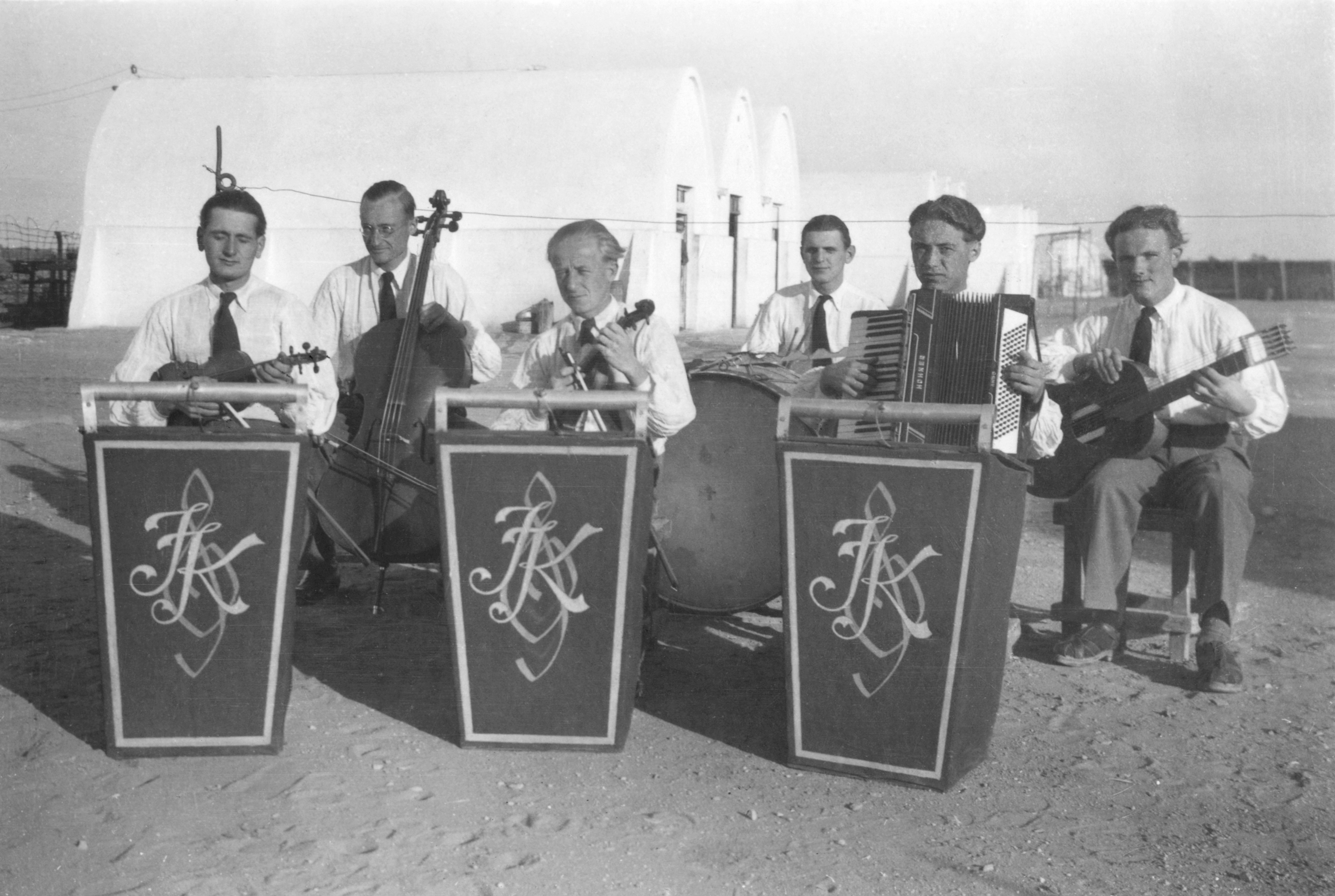
German prisoners (1946)

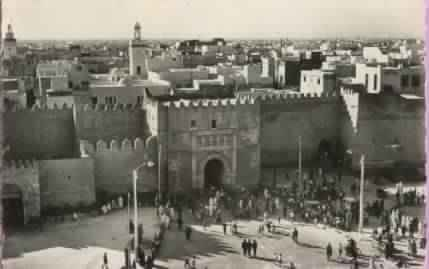
Bab Diwan and Old view of Sfax (1954)

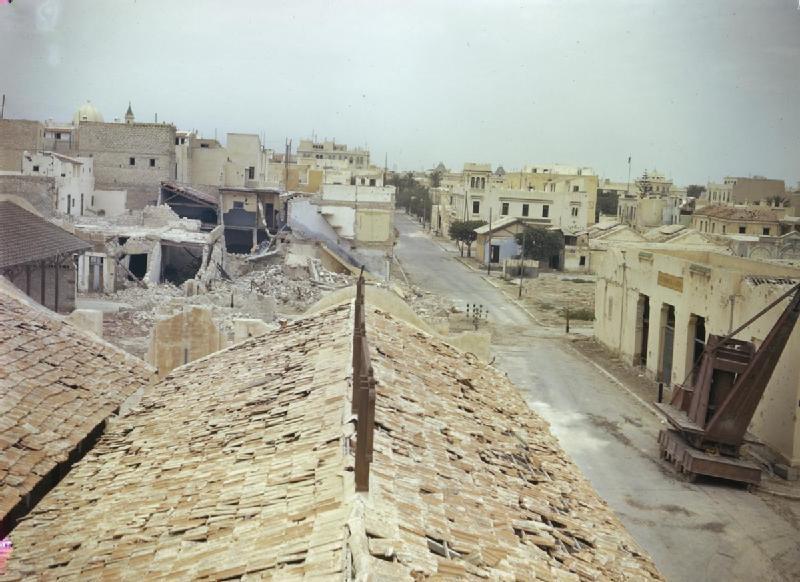
Street in Sfax after an Allied bombing raid in June 1943

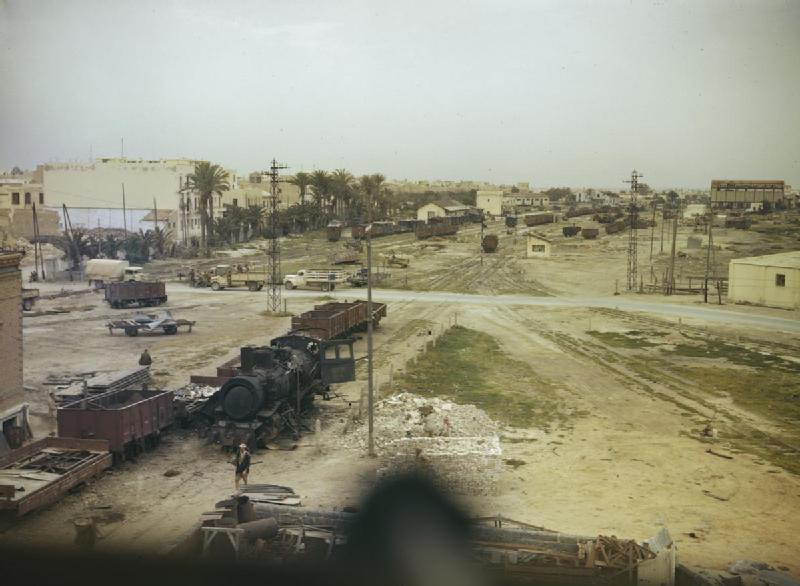
Train yard in Sfax after an Allied bombing raid in June 1943

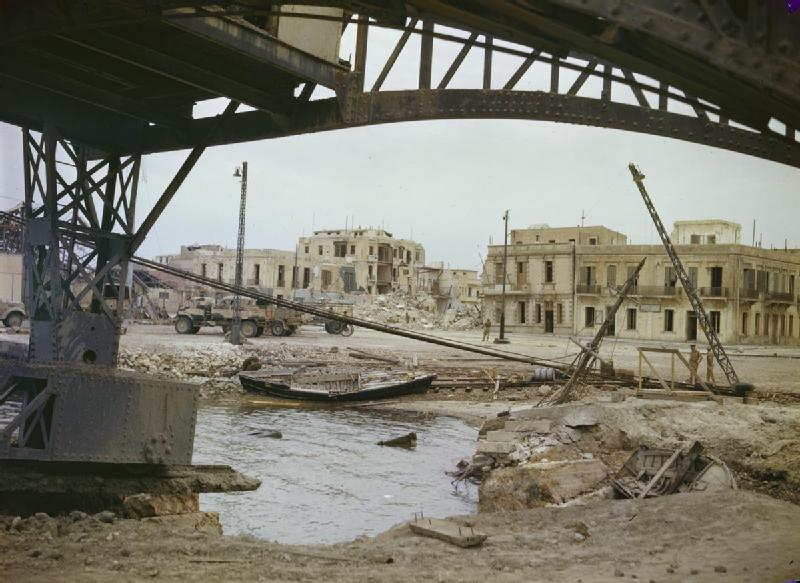
Warehouses near the port of Sfax after an Allied bombing raid in June 1943

== Geography ==
=== Climate ===
Sfax has a hot semi-arid climate (Köppen BSh). Owing to its sheltered location relative to Mediterranean Sea winter storms, Sfax receives half the rainfall of Tunis and less even than the major cities of Libya (Tripoli and Benghazi). Summers, like all of North Africa, are hot and almost rainless, whilst winters are very pleasant with usually only light rain.

Climate data for Sfax (1991–2020, extremes 1950–present)
Month	Jan	Feb	Mar	Apr	May	Jun	Jul	Aug	Sep	Oct	Nov	Dec	Year
Record high °C (°F)	26.8 (80.2)	32.7 (90.9)	36.9 (98.4)	37.2 (99.0)	41.3 (106.3)	47.8 (118.0)	47.2 (117.0)	46.8 (116.2)	43.5 (110.3)	38.6 (101.5)	34.5 (94.1)	28.7 (83.7)	47.8 (118.0)
Mean daily maximum °C (°F)	17.5 (63.5)	18.1 (64.6)	20.4 (68.7)	22.8 (73.0)	26.3 (79.3)	30.2 (86.4)	32.8 (91.0)	33.4 (92.1)	30.5 (86.9)	27.3 (81.1)	22.6 (72.7)	18.7 (65.7)	25.1 (77.2)
Daily mean °C (°F)	12.1 (53.8)	12.7 (54.9)	15.1 (59.2)	17.8 (64.0)	21.3 (70.3)	25.0 (77.0)	27.6 (81.7)	28.4 (83.1)	26.1 (79.0)	22.6 (72.7)	17.4 (63.3)	13.4 (56.1)	20.0 (68.0)
Mean daily minimum °C (°F)	6.8 (44.2)	7.2 (45.0)	9.8 (49.6)	12.7 (54.9)	16.3 (61.3)	19.9 (67.8)	22.4 (72.3)	23.3 (73.9)	21.7 (71.1)	17.9 (64.2)	12.2 (54.0)	8.2 (46.8)	14.9 (58.8)
Record low °C (°F)	−2.3 (27.9)	−1.2 (29.8)	−1.0 (30.2)	2.0 (35.6)	6.1 (43.0)	10.6 (51.1)	13.6 (56.5)	13.2 (55.8)	11.2 (52.2)	5.2 (41.4)	2.0 (35.6)	−1.0 (30.2)	−2.3 (27.9)
Average precipitation mm (inches)	23.9 (0.94)	15.3 (0.60)	27.5 (1.08)	17.3 (0.68)	13.7 (0.54)	6.1 (0.24)	1.0 (0.04)	6.3 (0.25)	33.8 (1.33)	24.8 (0.98)	21.7 (0.85)	26.0 (1.02)	217.4 (8.55)
Average precipitation days (≥ 1.0 mm)	2.8	2.5	3.3	2.6	1.7	0.8	0.1	0.9	3.1	2.9	2.5	2.9	26.3
Average relative humidity (%)	65	63	63	63	62	60	59	63	65	66	65	66	63
Mean monthly sunshine hours	191.8	202.7	231.2	251.6	306.6	338.1	369.8	335.8	254.3	225.4	208.4	193.2	3,108.9
Mean daily sunshine hours	6.4	7.2	7.7	8.6	10.0	11.1	12.2	11.2	9.1	7.8	7.0	6.3	8.7
Percentage possible sunshine	62	62	66	64	69	73	79	80	75	70	65	65	70
Average ultraviolet index	3	4	6	7	9	10	10	10	8	5	3	2	6
Source 1: Institut National de la Météorologie (humidity 1961–1990, sun 1981–2010) (Note: The Station ID for Sfax is 45050111.)
Source 2: NOAA (humidity/daily sun 1961–1990) and Weather Atlas (UV index)

Sfax mean sea temperature
Jan	Feb	Mar	Apr	May	Jun	Jul	Aug	Sep	Oct	Nov	Dec
16 °C (61 °F)	15 °C (59 °F)	15 °C (59 °F)	17 °C (63 °F)	19 °C (66 °F)	22 °C (72 °F)	26 °C (79 °F)	28 °C (82 °F)	27 °C (81 °F)	25 °C (77 °F)	22 °C (72 °F)	18 °C (64 °F)

=== Topography ===
The topography of the governorate of Sfax tilts regularly from the west to the coast and local presents small hills and mountain ranges in the form of elongated draâs.

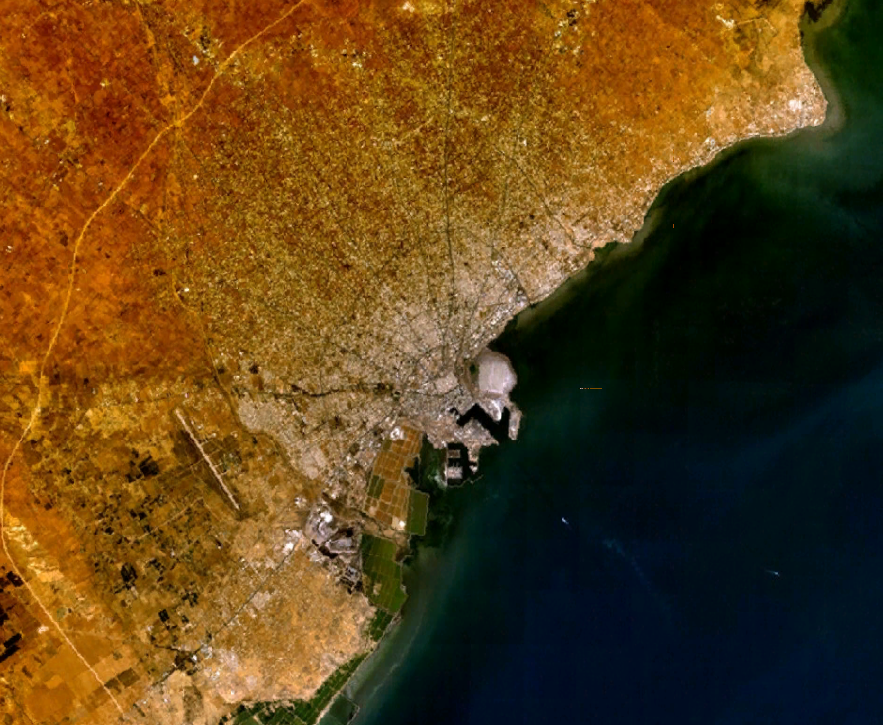
View of Sfax

==== Relief ====
Sfax is characterized by a monotonous, low and slightly uneven relief. The altitude rarely exceed 250 m, especially in the center-west of the governorate (Draâ Lahirech, 269 m; Djebel Chebka, 255 m). Most of the study site extends over wide plains not exceeding the 150 m above sea level, including a low coastal strip about 15 km wide and having an average altitude of 20 m.

==== Hydrography ====
The monotonous character, low and not very rugged of the topography largely determined the characteristics hydrographic in the governorate of Sfax. Indeed, the rivers are numerous, shallow and rarely reach the sea. The hills and small mountain ranges of the center-west present a hydrographic hairline dense and relatively deep compared to the coastal strip. Like a few exoreic rivers (wadi Agareb, wadi Laâchech, wadi El Maleh), most of the Wadis are endorheic, leading to closed depressions of the sebkhas and garâas type. Depending on their morpho-structural conditions, these closed depressions take the form of basins synclinal (Menzel Chaker and Hancha regions) or the form of sebkhas and garâas (Noual, Bou Jmal, Mchiguigue, Karafita... etc.).

== Neighborhoods ==
Whether in the city center or between the radial roads, there are large, popular neighborhoods in Sfax, most of which are:

- Hay El Rabdh
- Hay El Habib
- Hay El Bahri
- Hay Bourguiba
- Hay El Badrani
- Hay Ennasr
- Hay El Maez
- Hay Thyna

== Politics and administration ==
=== Mayor and municipality ===
Mayors since 1956
Mayor	Party	Start of mandate	End of mandate
Abdelatif Chaker		1956	1957
Mohamed Makni		1957	1960
Abdelmajid Chaker		1960	1966
Sadok Guermazi		1966	1975
Tijani Makni		1975	1980
Ahmed Bellassoued		1980	1985
Ahmed Zeghal		1985	1990
Mohamed Chaker		1990	1995
Mohamed El Hadj Tayeb		2000	2010
Moncef Abdelhedi		2010	2011
Mohamed Najib Abdelmoula		2011	2012
Mabrouk Kessentini		2012	2017
Imed Sebri		2017	2018
Hamza Dhahri		2018	2018
Mounir Elloumi	Ennahdha	2018	present

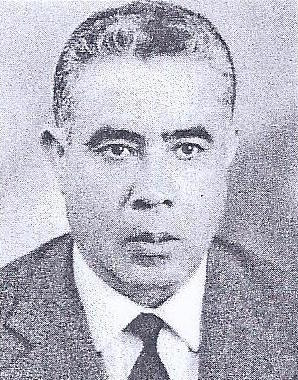
Sadok Ghermazi

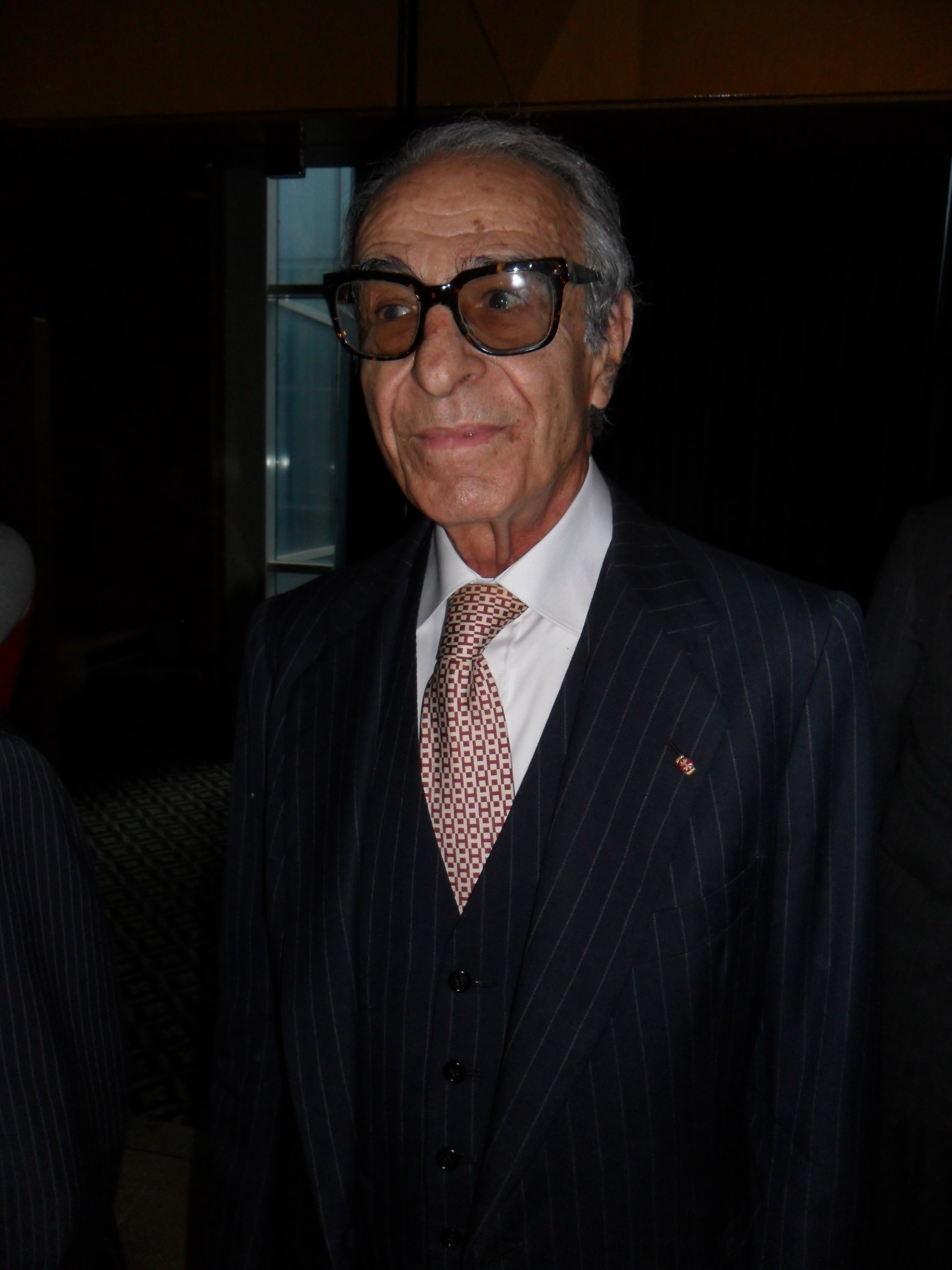
Abdelmajid Chaker

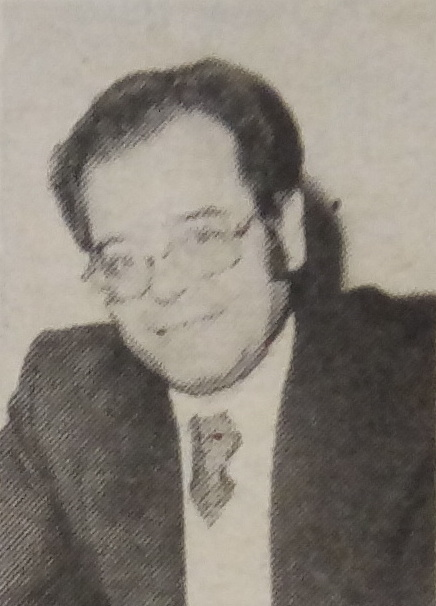
Mohamed Chaker

Ennahdha: 14 seats Nidaa Tounes: 7 seats Democratic Current: 8 seats Front populaire: 2 seats Other movement: 9 seats Independent movement: 2 seats

The current mayor of the city is Mounir Elloumi (belonging to Ennahdha), elected in the 2018 Tunisian local elections

Party	Seats
Ennahdha	14
Nidaa Tounes	7
Democratic Current	8
Front populaire	2
Other movement	9
Independent movement	2
Total	42

=== Administrative division ===
Sfax Governorate

The Sfax Governorate has 16 municipalities:

3411	Sfax	273,506
3412	Sakiet Ezzit	66,634
3413	Chihia	30,014
3414	Sakiet Eddaïer	52,901
3415	Gremda	49,140
3416	El Aïn	44,258
3417	Thyna	53,349
3418	Agareb	46,652
3419	Jebiniana	36,407
3420	El Hencha	37,041
3421	Menzel Chaker	22,004
3422	Ghraïba	16,678
3423	Bir Ali Ben Khalifa	32,383
3424	Skhira	40,035
3425	Mahares	35,698
3426	Kerkennah	15,382
	El Achech	20,542
	El Amra	35,808
	El Nasr	18,393
	Hadjeb	26,412
	Hazeg - Ellouza	21,957
	Nadhour - Sidi Ali Ben Abed	22,956
	Ouabed - Khazanet	49,318
	Sfax (suburbs/other aggregations if separate)	N/A

== Demographics ==
Historical population
Year	Pop.	±%
1993	714,900	—
2006	881,000	+23.2%
2007	893,000	+1.4%
2008	905,000	+1.3%
2009	906,129	+0.1%
2010	916,190	+1.1%
2011	926,363	+1.1%
2012	936,647	+1.1%
2013	947,046	+1.1%
2014	958,100	+1.2%
2015	971,300	+1.4%
2016	983,300	+1.2%
2017	995,300	+1.2%
2019	1,013,021	+1.8%

In 2019, the population of Sfax has reached 1,013,021 inhabitants. The urban population represents 63.7% of the population. In 2014 the Males represent 50.2% of the population structure with a population of 140,752. As to the Females, they represent 49.1% with a population of 139,814.

== Architecture and urbanism ==
=== Medina ===
The Medina represents one of the most important quarters of Sfax. it plays a touristic and historical role of the city. It was built by Aghlabid prince Abu Abbass Muhammad between 849 and 851. The medina is home to about 113,000 residents and is dominated by the Great Mosque of Sfax.

==== Walls and gates ====
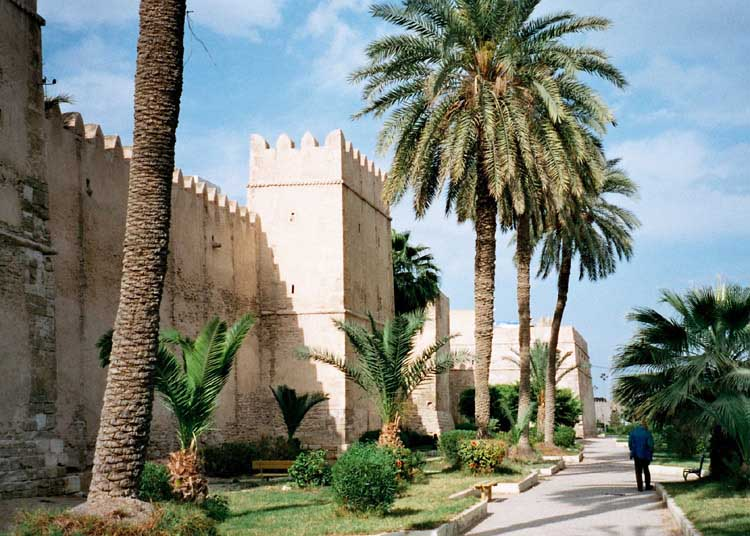
Walls of the medina

Apart from Borj Ennar and three other towers that disappeared, the walls of the medina kept the same original architecture since 1306. These are 2,750 meters long and have 34 dungeons. Their height varies between seven and eleven meters.

Originally, the medina had only two doors: Bab Jebli, also known as Bab Dhahraoui (northern door), and Bab Diwan or Bab Bahr (the sea door). Yet, in the 20th century and because of the economic development and the huge increase of the population, new doors had to be created to reduce the flow from these two main doors such as Bab El Ksar and Bab Jebli Jedid.

==== Kasbah ====
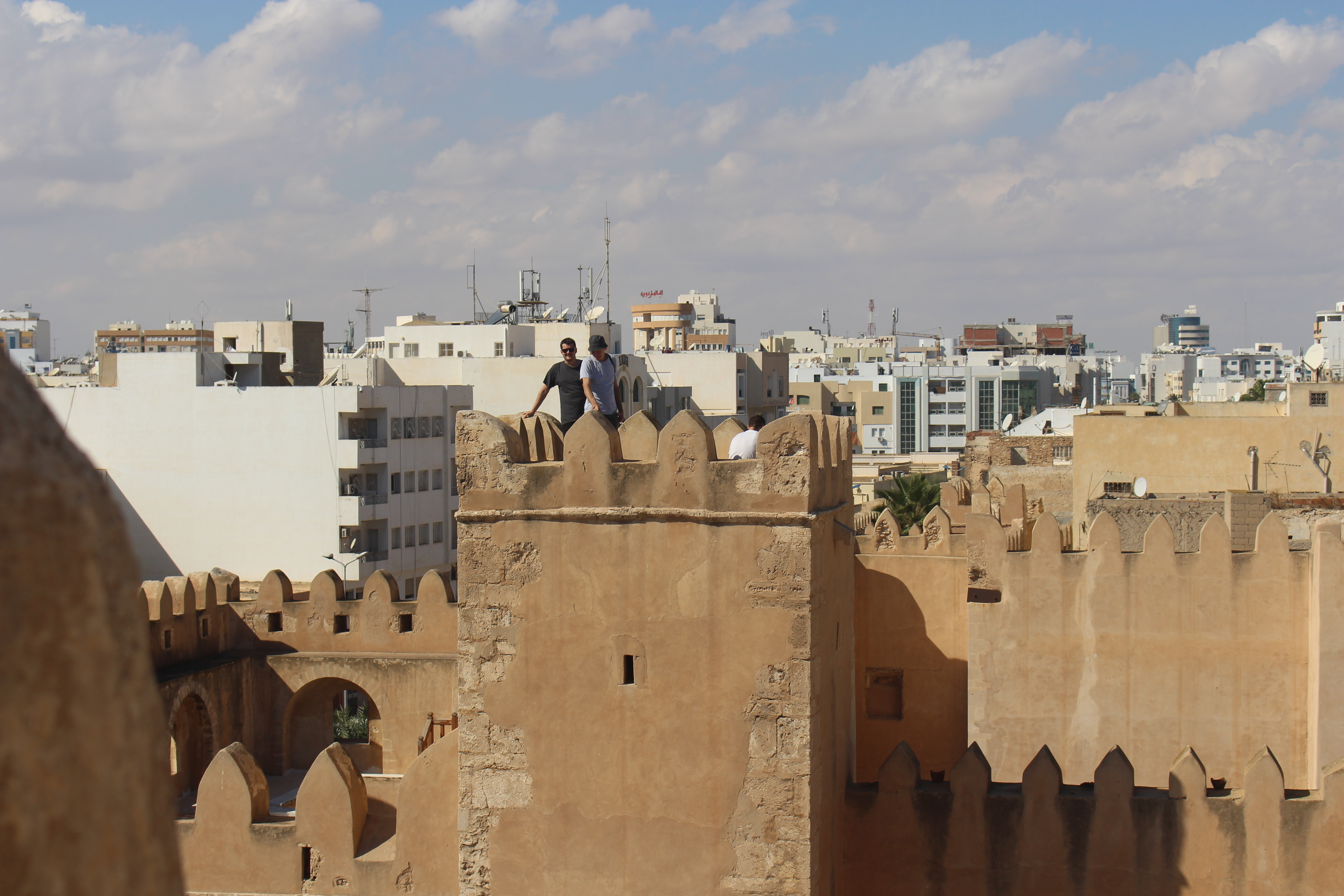
A tour in the Kasbah of Sfax

Like most of the other medinas of Tunisia, Sfax has its own kasbah. It is a fortress, located in the southwestern corner of the medina. It was used for different purposes throughout history, first, a control tower built by the Aghlabids on the coast, then the seat of the municipal government, and then the main army barracks. Its construction was preceded by the deployment of the wall and the medina quarter. Today it is served as a museum of traditional architecture.

==== Mausoleums and mosques ====
Also here are the Sidi Amar Kammoun Mausoleum, Sidi Ali Ennouri Mausoleum, Sidi Belhassen Karray Mausoleum, El Ajouzine Mosque, Bouchouaicha Mosque, Driba Mosque and Sidi Elyes Mosque.

=== City hall ===
The city hall of Sfax is in the center of the modern city and opens on Habib Bourguiba Street in parallel with the main entrance of the historic city. The Municipal Palace draws attention to the magnificence and beauty of its exterior architecture and its interior decorations and masterpieces. This unique landmark was designed by French architect Rafael Guy, who blended the Arab-Moriscan character with the European character The project of the construction of the Palace of the scourge began at the beginning of the twentieth century, where the municipality issued a tender for this purpose in the newspaper Adebash Svaxian on 30 June 1904 and began construction works in late 1905 and ended in 1906 In 1912, he began to expand gradually until around 1943 After the Second World War, the town hall was completed in 1955.

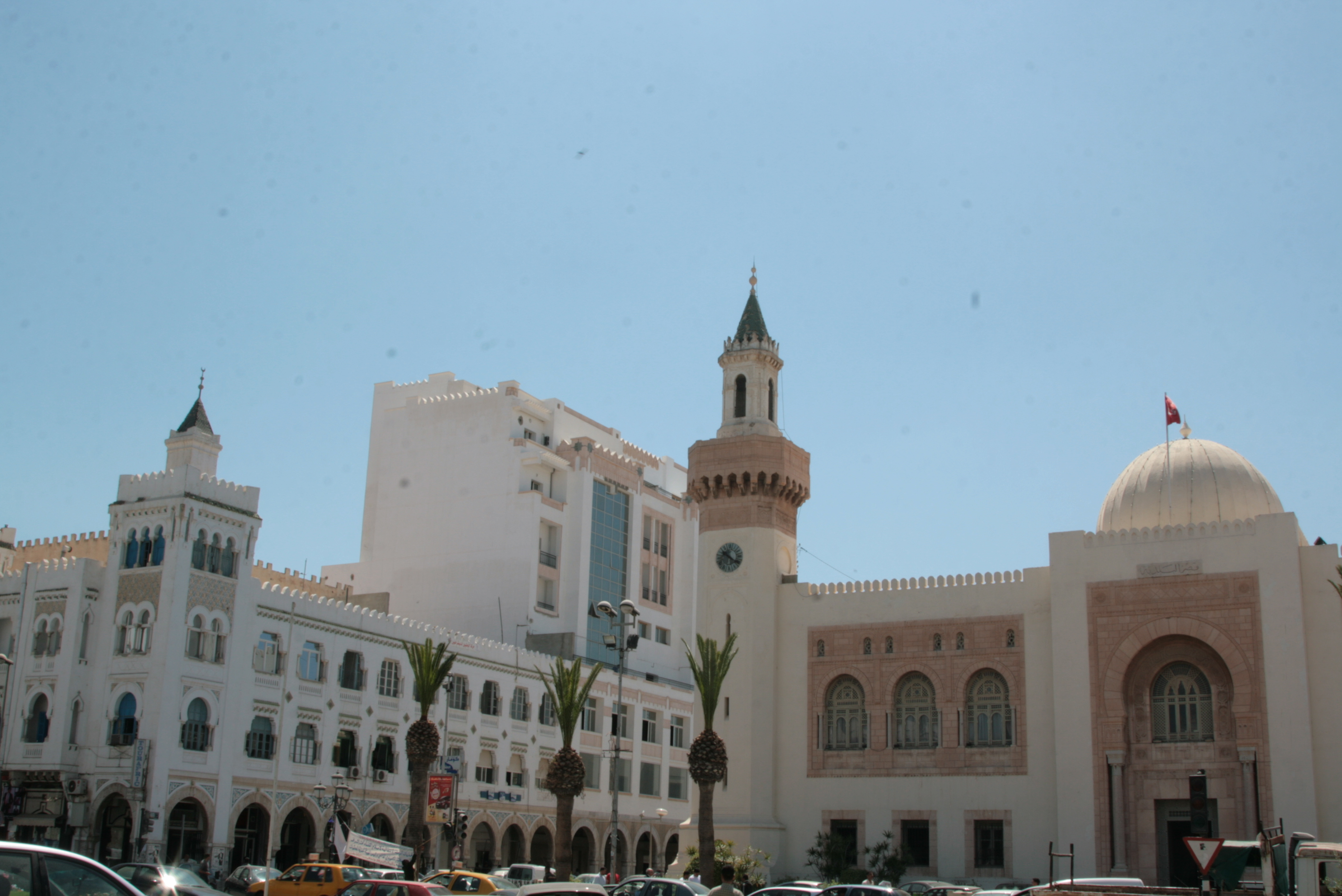

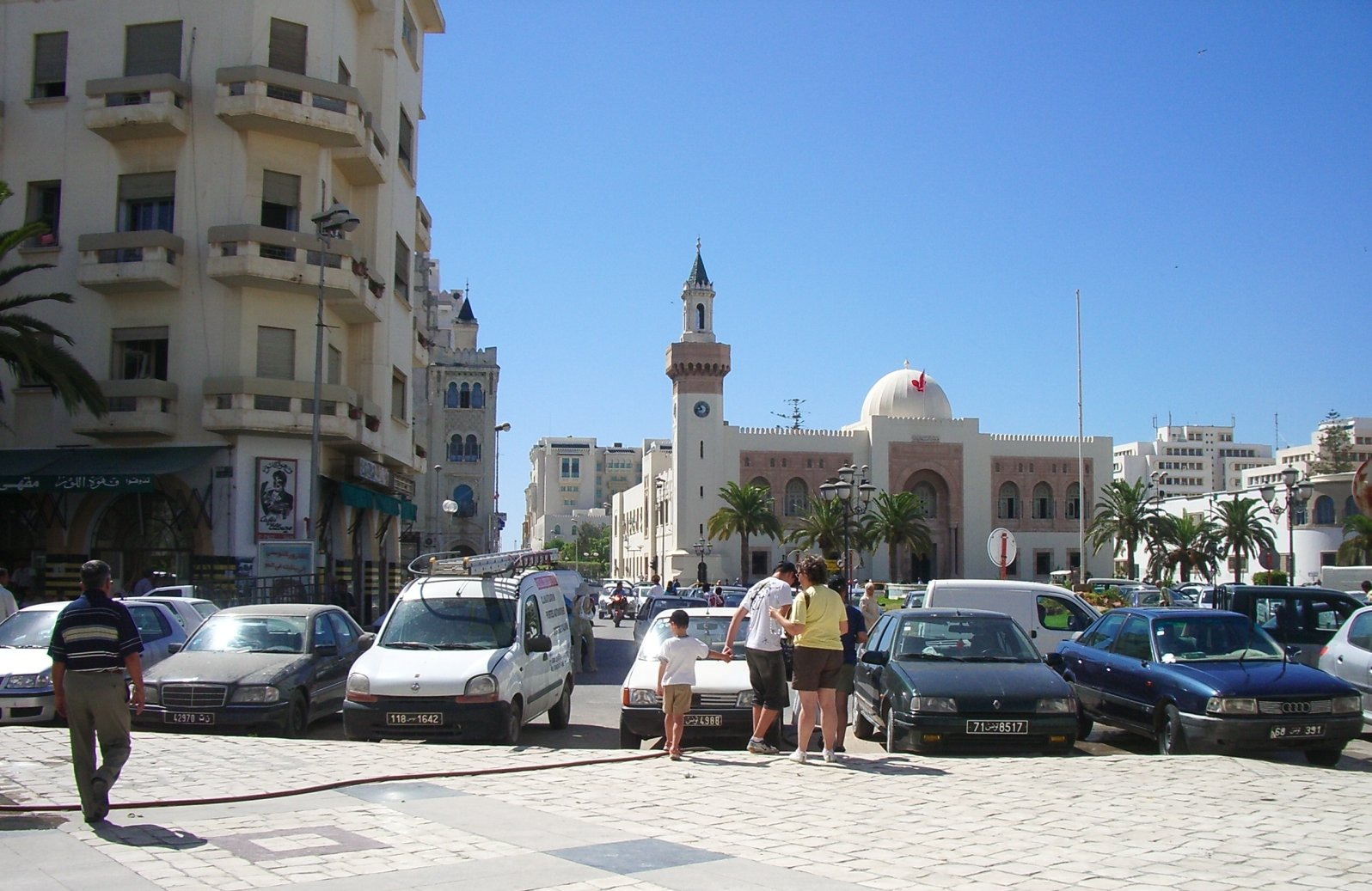

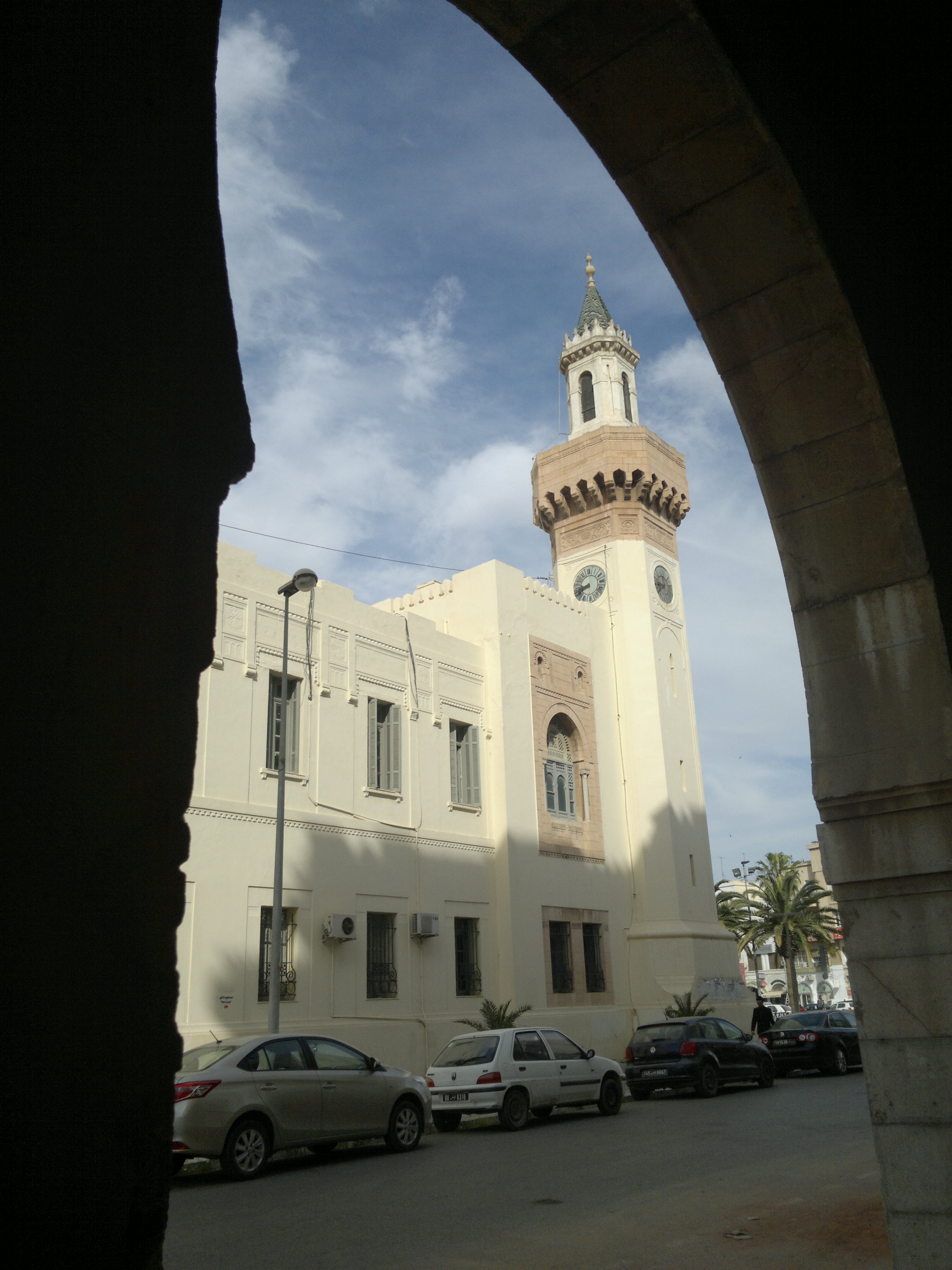

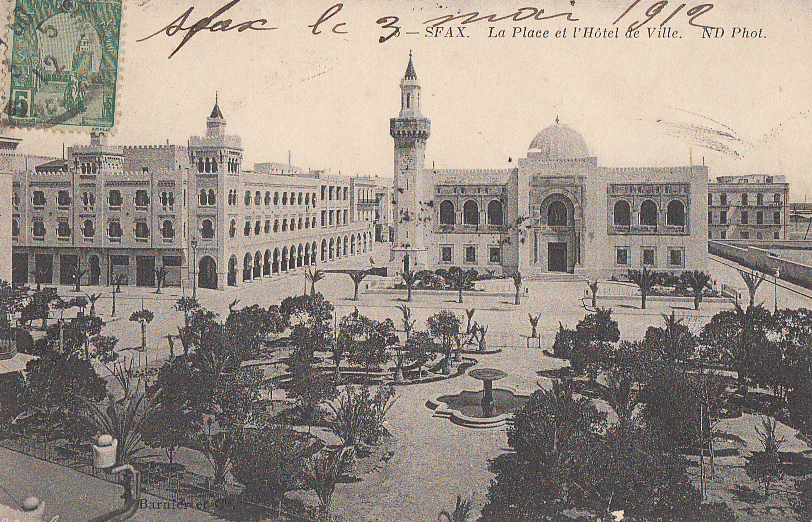

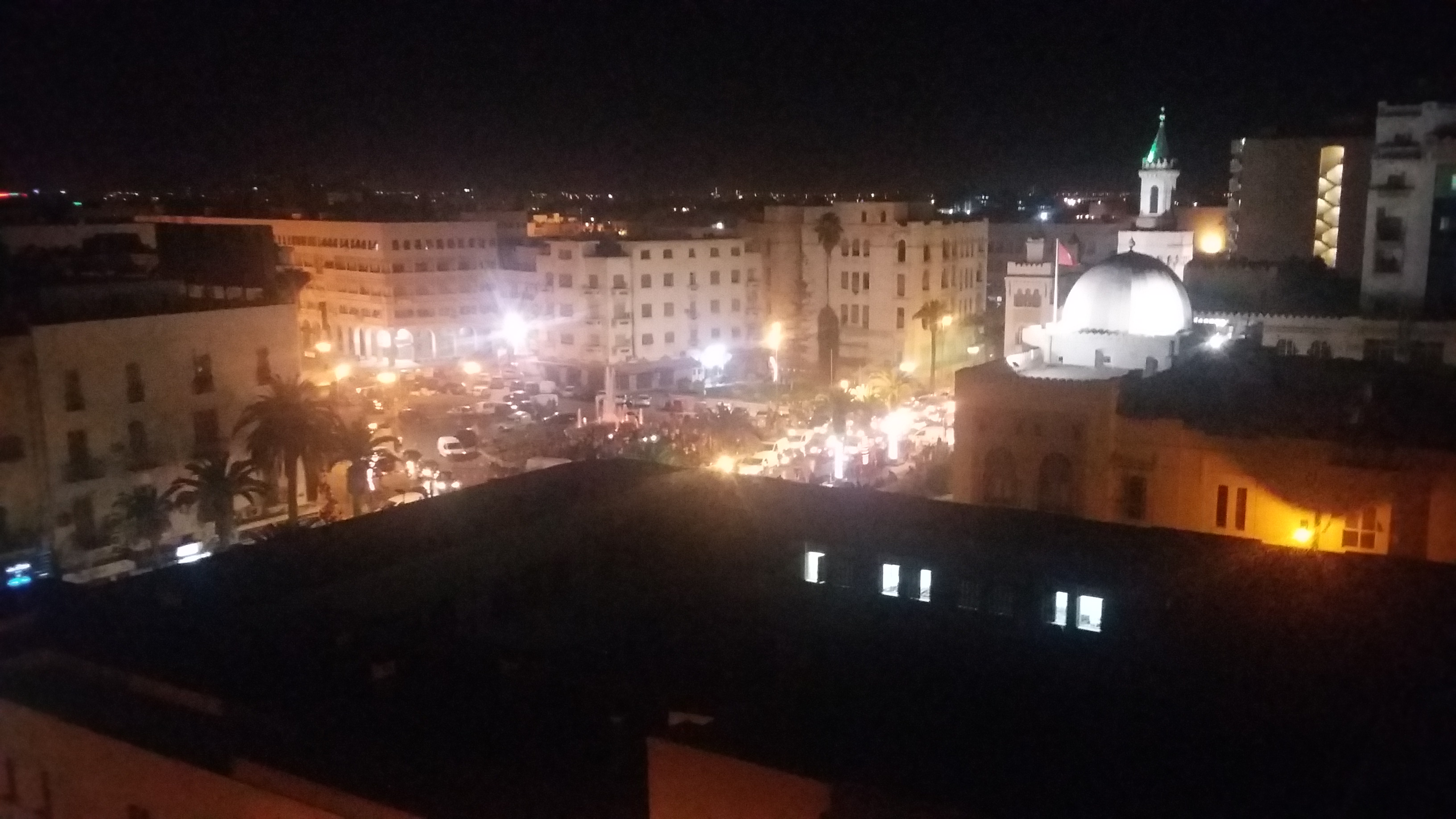

=== Cityscape ===
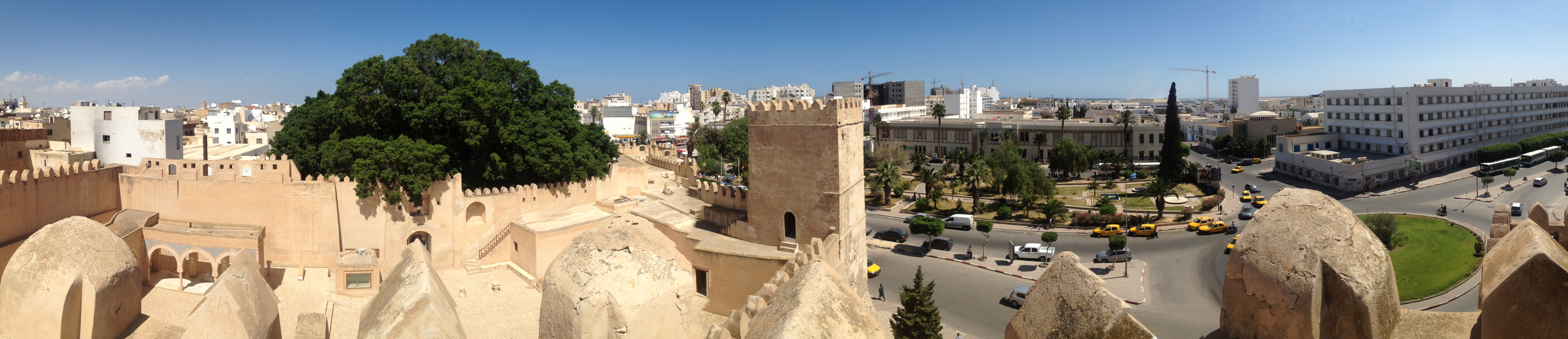
View of Sfax from the Kasbah

== Culture ==
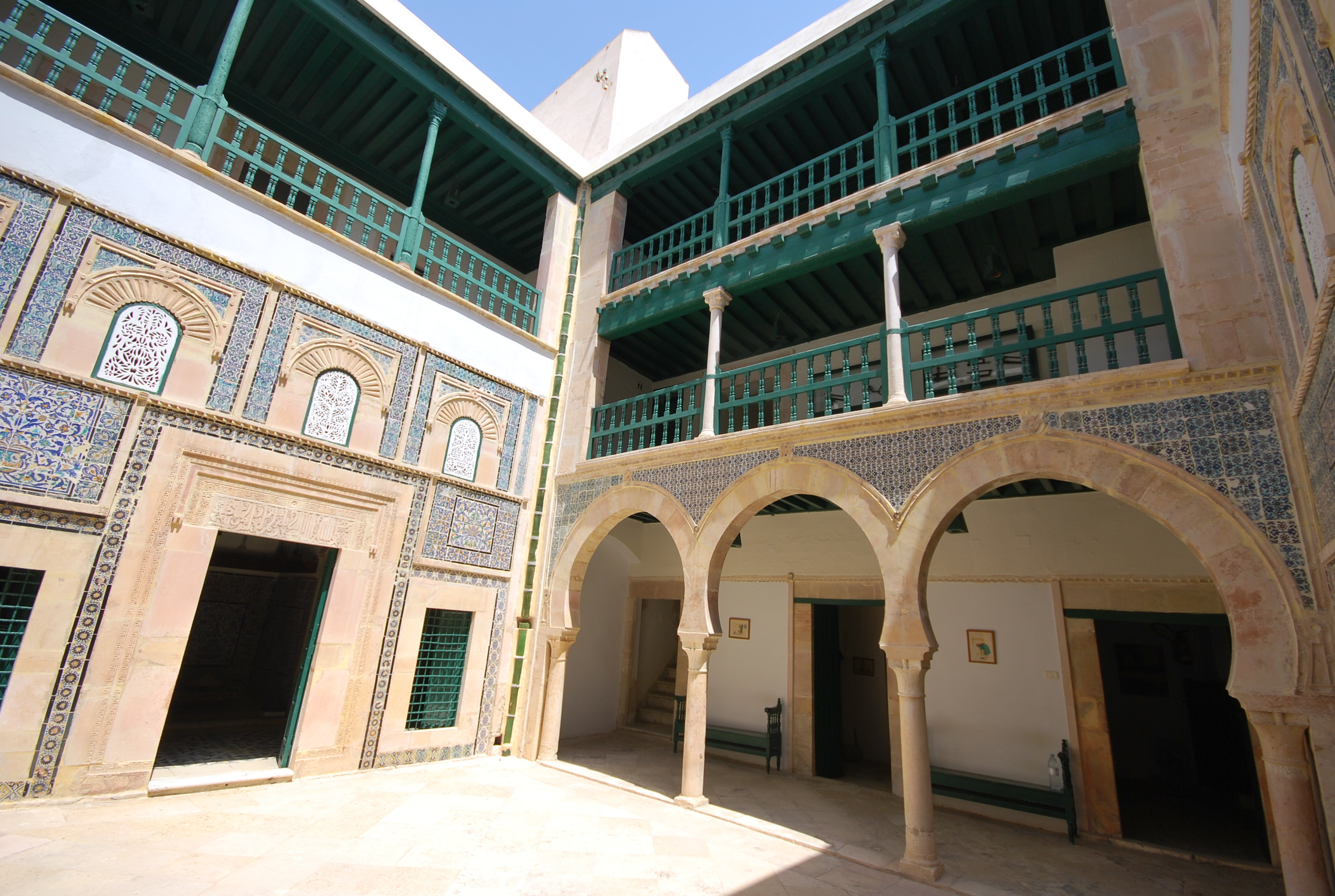
Dar Jellouli

The city of Sfax includes an archaeological museum, located in the municipal building and is open during the hours of municipal services, which includes a collection of ancient archaeological discoveries in the city and in the close sites, including the ancient city Thanae (Thyna); its collections include pieces dating from prehistoric, Roman and Islamic. Sfax also contains a museum of arts and traditions located in the medina called Dar Jallouli.

=== Education ===
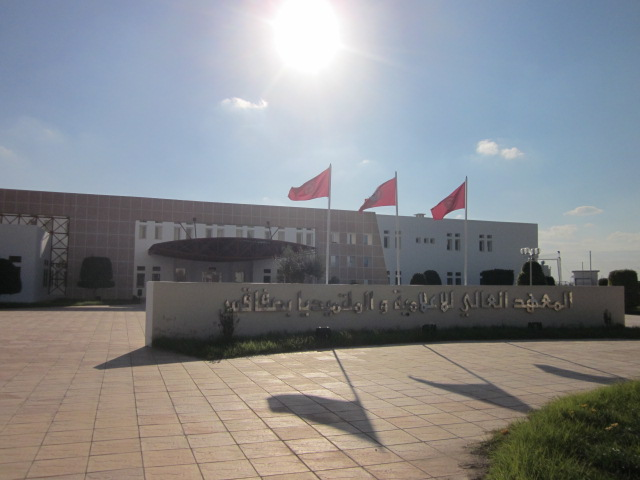
University of Informatique and Multimedia of Sfax

Sfax concentrates the main educational institutions of the south of the Sahel:

The University of Sfax includes:

- ENIS (École Nationale d'Ingénieurs de Sfax) issued a number of well-known scientists and industrialists.
- ESCS (École Supérieure de Commerce de Sfax) issued a number of managers, Economy and Management researchers and young entrepreneurs.
- FLSHS (Faculté des Lettres et des Sciences Humaines de Sfax) issued a number of renowned poets and prose writers.
- Sfax Faculty of Medicine (Faculté de Médecine de Sfax).
- ISAAS (Institut Supérieur d'Administration des Affaires de Sfax)
- FSEGS (Faculté des Sciences Économiques et de Gestion de Sfax).
- FSS (Faculty of Science Sfax) .
- ISIMS (Institut Supérieur d'Informatique et de Multimédia de Sfax).
- FDS (Faculté de Droit de Sfax)
- ISAMS (Institut Supérieur des Arts et Métiers de Sfax)
- IHEC (Institut des Hautes Etudes Commerciales de Sfax)

The North American Private University was founded in 2012 and brings together three institutes:

- The International Institute of Technology (IIT)
- The International School of Architecture (ISA, a department of IIT)
- The International School of Business (ISB)

=== Theater ===
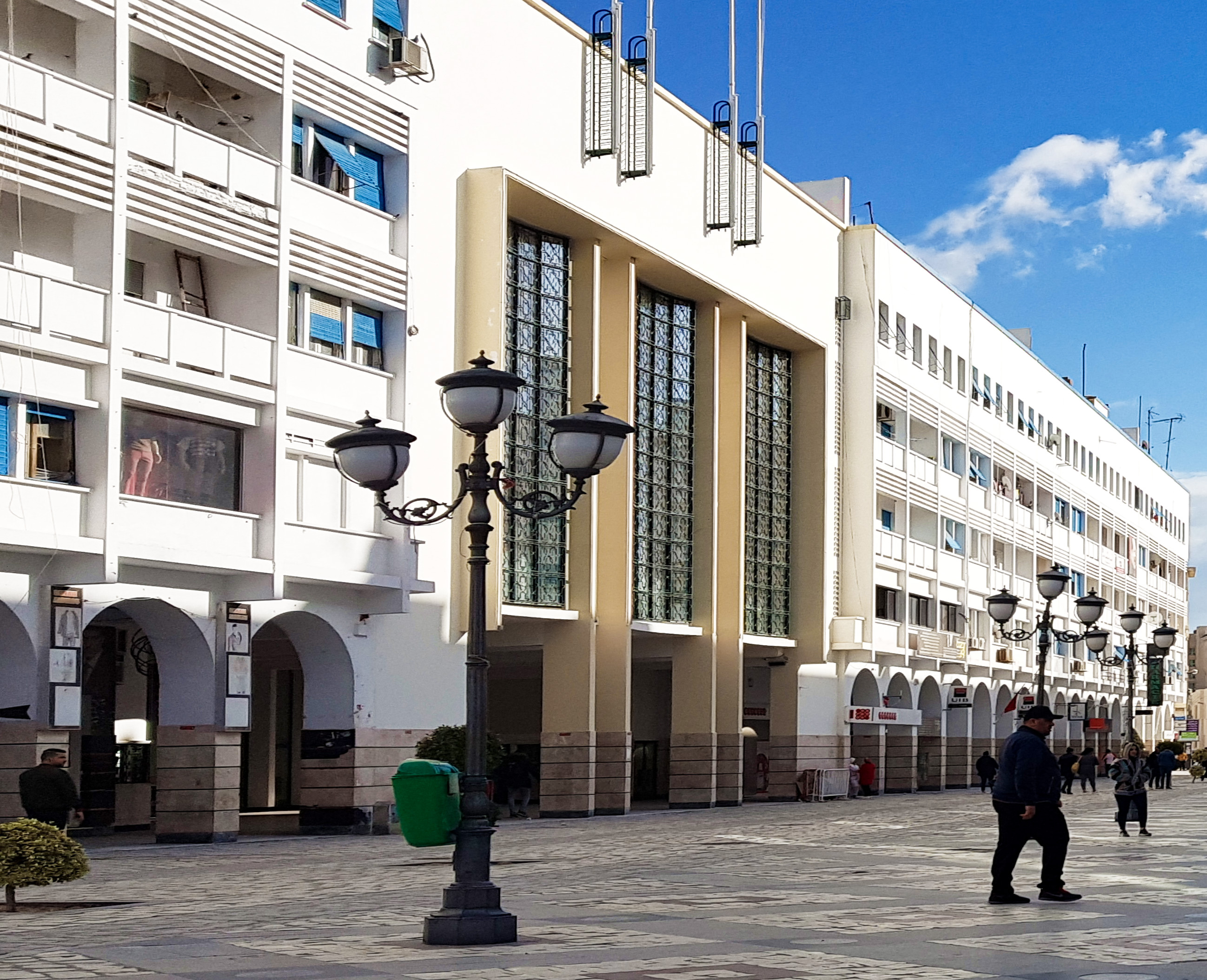
Municipal Theater of Sfax

The city had a municipal theater between 1903 and 1942 built by the architect Raphaël Guy according to a neo-Moorish architecture, in line with the seat of the municipality and the Ramdanetru palace. It was bombarded during campaign of Tunisia which nevertheless targeted the commercial port much further south of the city and during which the Frankish quarter was completely razed.

=== Festival ===
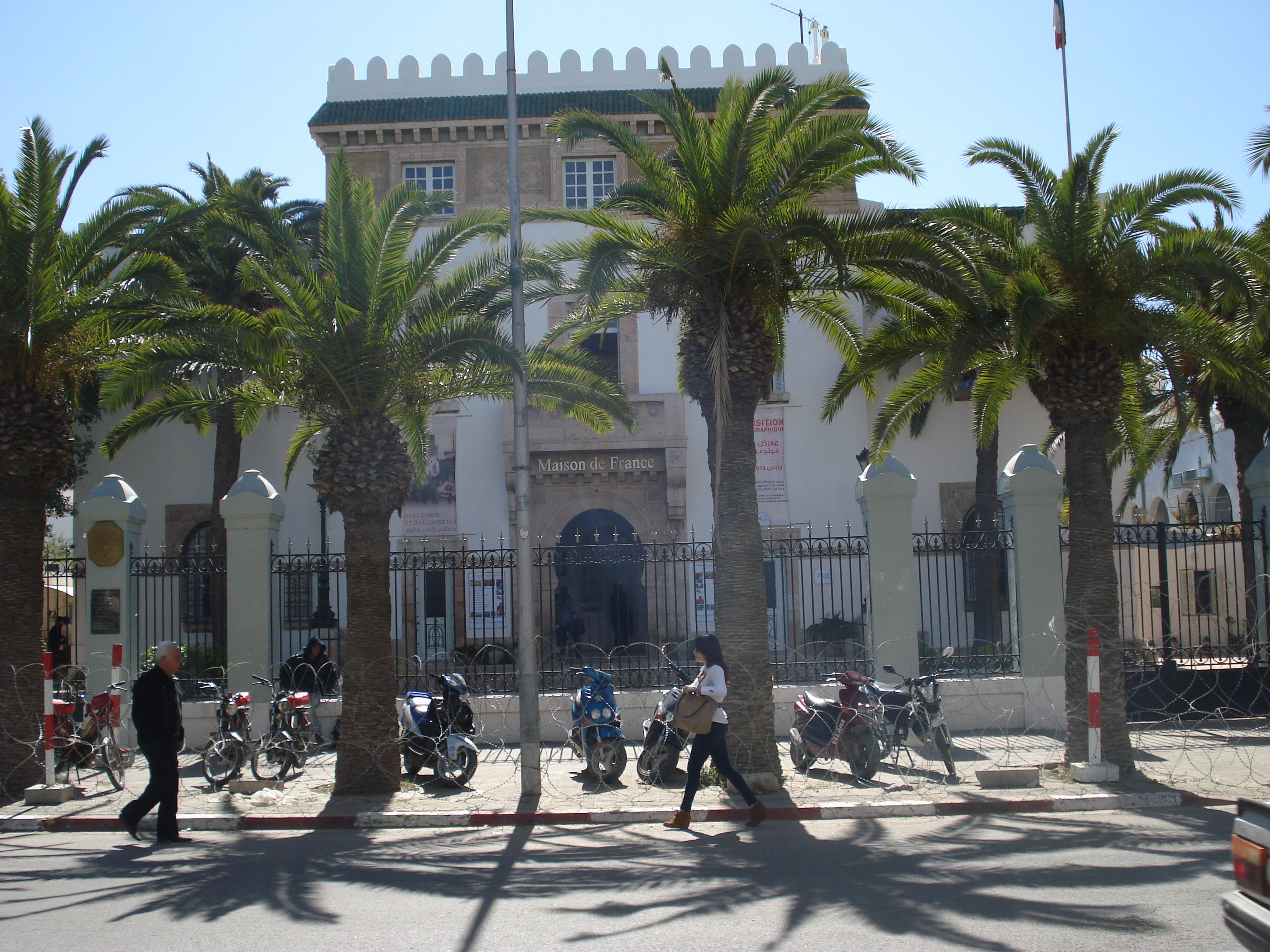
Maison de France of Sfax

The city of Sfax organizes the International Festival of Sfax, a summer event which welcomes artists from various countries.

=== Maison de France ===
The French Institute of Sfax, commonly Maison de France (French House), is a space of meeting, reflection, and creation open to all and also of expression, whose goal is to support and supervise the activities of the civil city and its artists. It was opened the 16 June 2006.

It has more than 40,000 visitors per year, and more than 50 cultural events. There is also a library that makes more than 20,000 documents available to the public.

== Economy ==
Economy of Sfax by sector
1. Agriculture (25.3%)
2. Industry (24.4%)
3. Services and others (50.3%)

Sfax is the second-most important industrial city in Tunisia. Sfax's most important industries are leather, wool, olive and almond cultivation, and fishing. Sfax is known for many traditional crafts industries such as construction, traditional handicrafts, carpentry, blacksmithing, as well as handcrafting of gold and silver.

=== Sectors ===
Agriculture, especially olive cultivation, despite all these changes occupies an important place in the regional economy. Agricultural land occupies almost the entire area of the region (90%). The city produces on average 40% of the olive oil and 30% of the almonds of Tunisia, which makes it the first national producer. Another component of the Sfaxian economy is the exploitation of petroleum: the Miskar natural gas field covers a total area of 352 km2 and has a capacity of 22.7 billion m³. On there exploit 1.18 million tons per year.

=== Statistics ===
The working population is divided between three sectors: agriculture and fishing (25.3%), services (25.6%), and manufacturing industries (24.4%).

Statistics of the Sfaxian economy by sectors and field:

==== Agriculture ====
- Cultivable land (S.A.U): 639,000 ha
- Irrigated Areas: 12,300 ha
- Forests and pastures: 118,000 ha

==== Fishing ====
- Coastal fishing: 6,500 tonnes
- Trawl fishing: 13,000 tonnes
- Tuna fishing: 2,700 tonnes
- Fire fishing: 1,140 tonnes
- Sponge and mussel peach: 417 tonnes

==== Energy ====
- Oil: 1,2 millions m3
- Gas: 1,7 milliards m3

== Transport ==
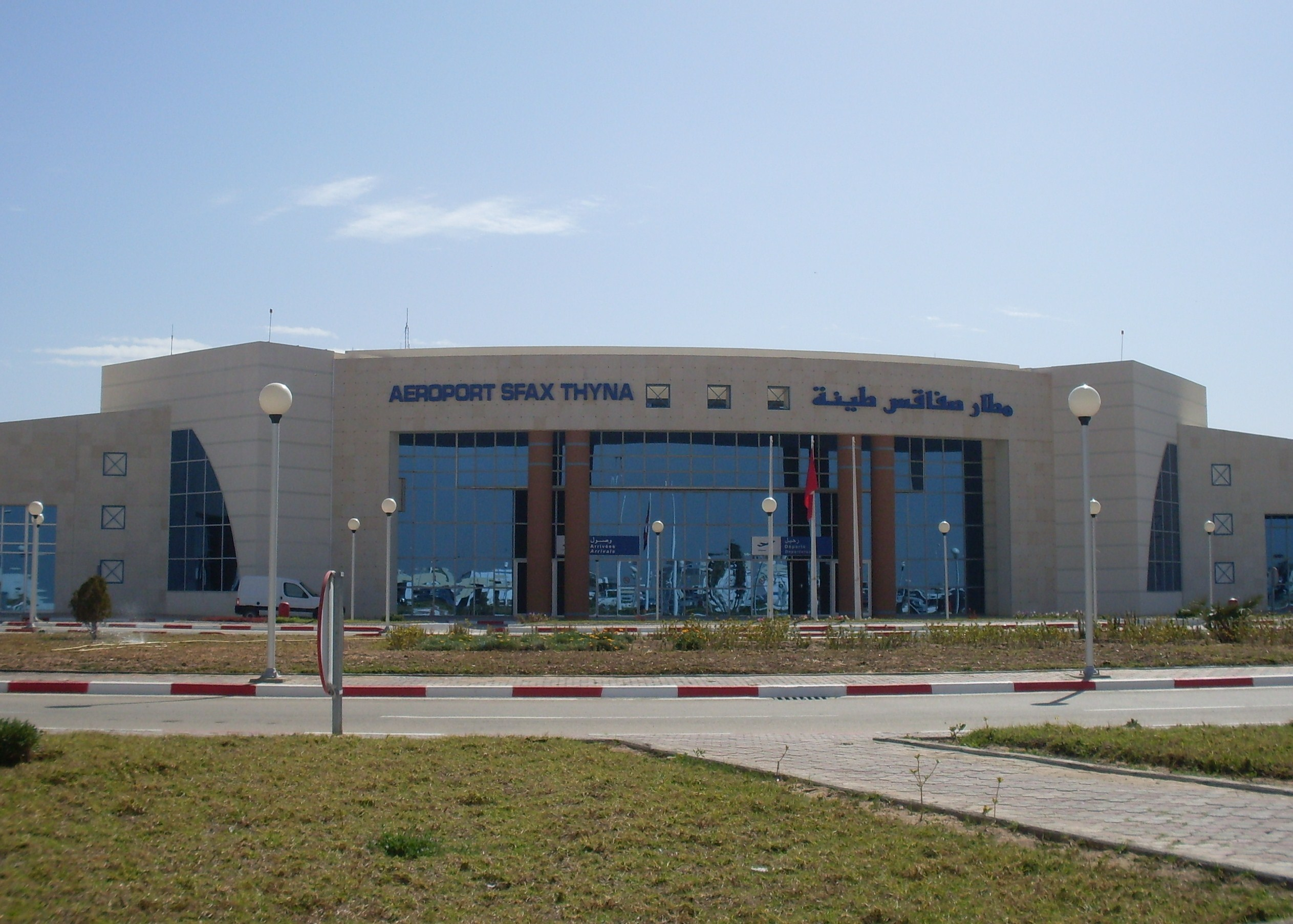
Sfax – Thyna International Airport

=== Motorways ===
The A1 motorway connects Sfax with Tunis and also with Gabès that was inaugurated in 2017.

- Motorways:
  - A1: (Tunis, Gabès, Bou Hajla, M'saken)
- Projects:
  - National roads: (Kerkennah, Sidi Bouzid, Tataouine)

=== Railways ===
A narrow-gauge railway system of SNCFT offers passenger services to Tunis and delivers phosphates and iron ore for export.

=== Airports ===
Sfax is served by Sfax–Thyna International Airport and Syphax Airlines has regularly scheduled flights to Paris-Charles de Gaulle Airport, Montréal–Pierre Elliott Trudeau International Airport, Sabiha Gökçen International Airport, Tripoli International Airport, and charter flights to Jeddah Airport for the pilgrimage to Mecca.

== Media ==
Founded in 1961, Radio Sfax broadcasts 20 hours a day on MW 720 kHz/105.21 MHz.

There is also:

- Al Qalam TV
- Diwan FM
- Chams El-Janoub, hebdomadaire arabophone
- La Gazette du Sud, mensuel francophone

== Sport ==
Sfax has four sports clubs, for football, volleyball and basketball: CS Sfaxien, Sfax Railway Sport, Stade Sportif Sfaxien, Progrès Sportive de Sakiet eddaïer:

Club	Stadium	Foundation	Football championships	Volleyball championships	Basketball championships
Club Sportif Sfaxien	Taieb Mhiri Stadium	1928	8	11	19 (women's)
Sfax Railways Sports	Stade Ameur-El Gargouri	1920	3	2	1
Stade Sportif Sfaxien	Stade 2-Mars	1960	0	–	–

== Notable people ==
- Ahmed Abbes, mathematician
- Ali Abdi, professional footballer
- Max Azria, fashion designer
- Mamdouh Bahri, artist, composer, jazz guitarist, and teacher
- Majida Boulila, militant
- Hédi Bouraoui, poet and writer
- Nouri Bouzid, film director
- Hamdi Braa, basketball player
- Mohamed Charfi, academic, politician, jurist, and scholar
- Eoin Colfer, Irish author; worked in Sfax in the 1990s and set several of his books there
- Aymen Dahmen, professional footballer
- Moncef Dhouib, director and screenwriter
- Luciano Di Napoli (Sfax born), Italian pianist and conductor
- Tom Dixon, British industrial designer
- Serge Dumont, business executive
- Mohamed Fourati, surgeon
- Mohamed Gouaida, footballer
- Farhat Hached, trade union leader assassinated by the French government
- Mohamed Jamoussi, artist, poet, composer, and singer
- Fakhreddine Karray, Expert AI scientist, inventor
- Claude Kayat, Franco-Swedish writer and dramatist
- Mounir Laroussi, scientist, inventor
- Christian Lauba, composer
- Mounir Lazzez, UFC fghter
- Ali Maâloul, professional footballer
- Abdessalem Mseddi, former Minister of Higher Education, linguist, and writer
- Fattouma Namla, activist
- Georges Perec, writer
- Saber Rebai, Tunisian pan-Arab singer and composer
- Hatem Trabelsi, former football player

== International relations ==
=== Twin towns – sister cities ===
Sfax is twinned with:

- Grenoble, France
- Makhachkala, Russia
- Marburg, Germany
- Dakar, Senegal
- Oran, Algeria
- Safi, Morocco

== Gallery ==
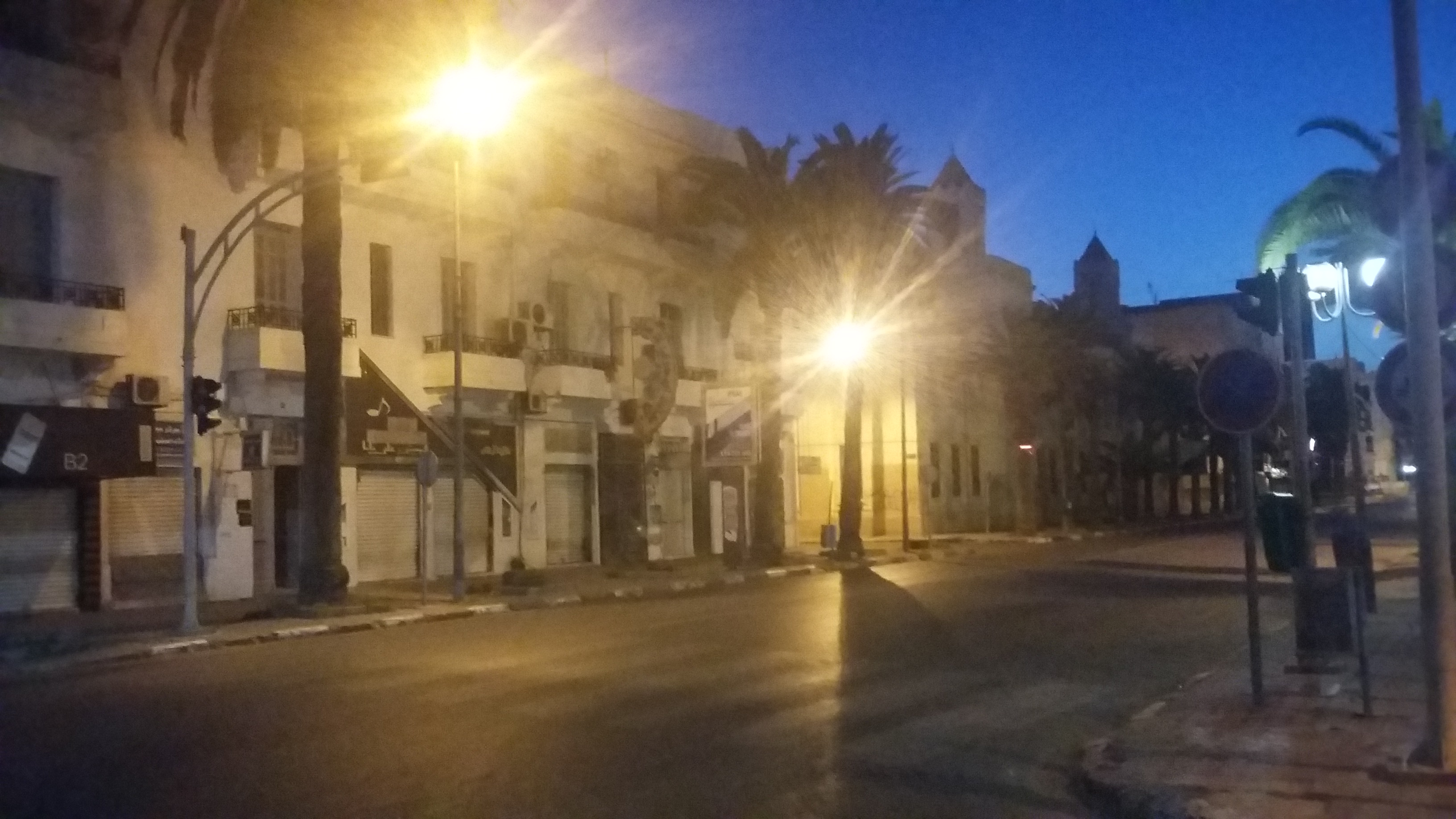

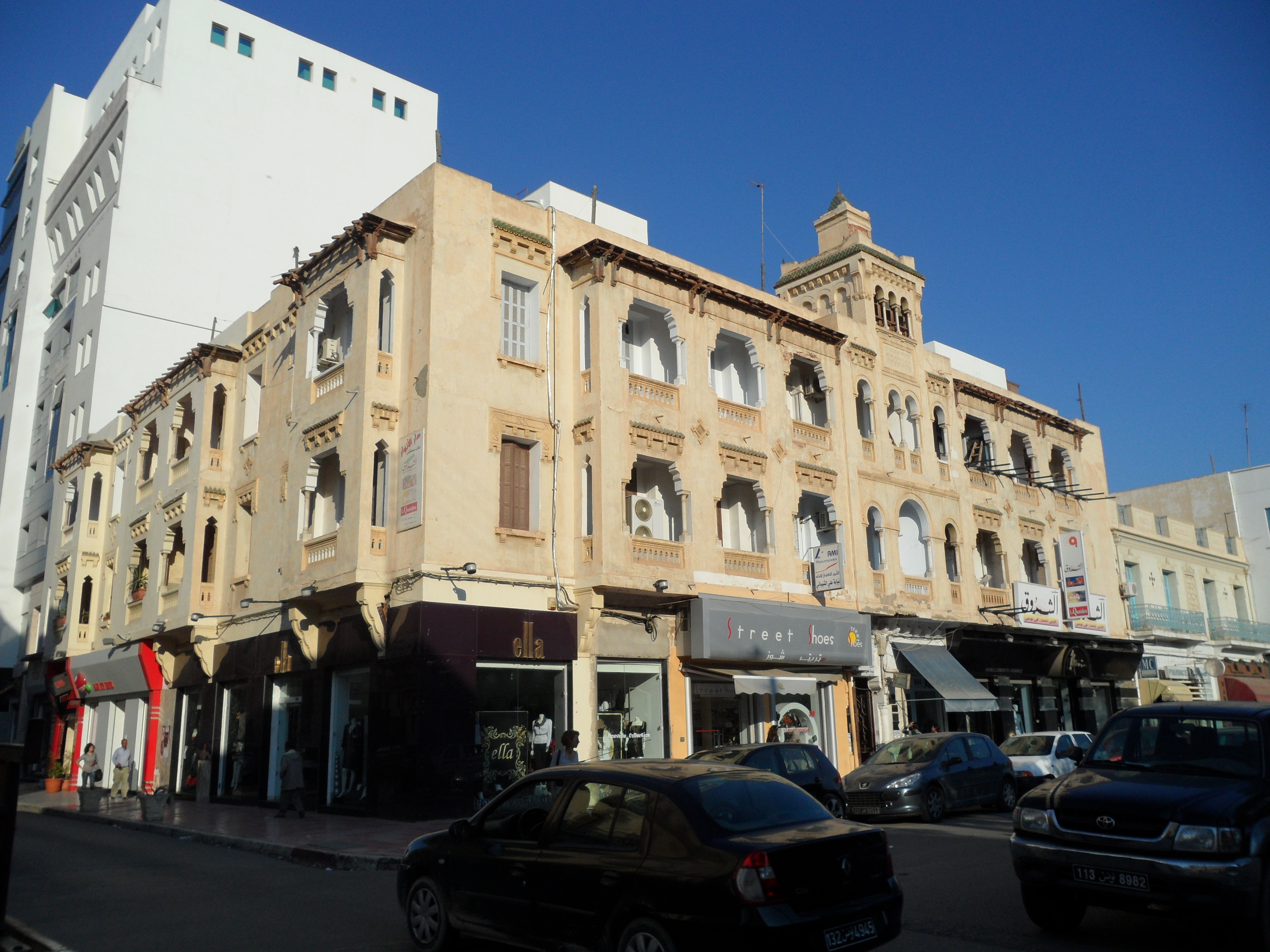

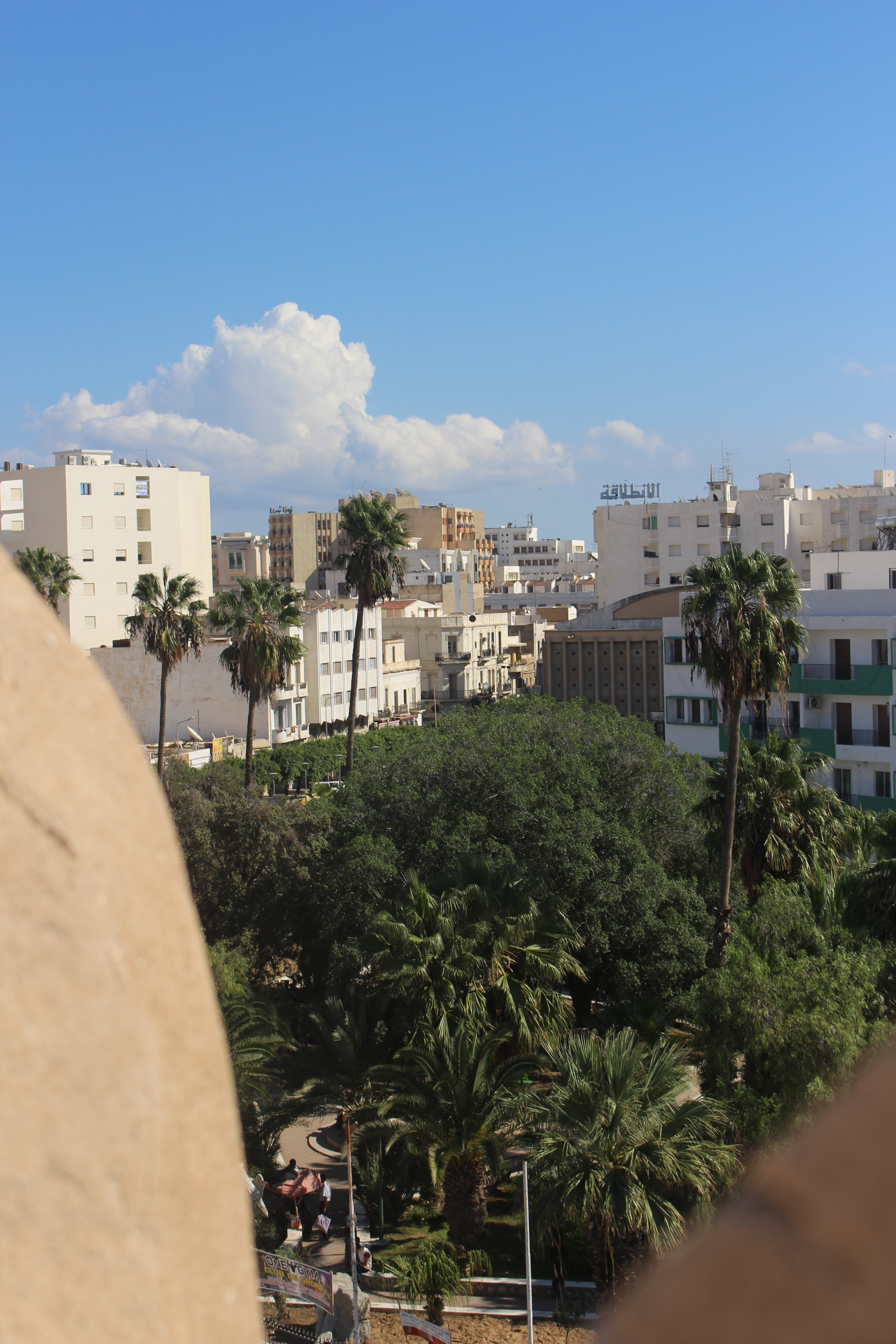

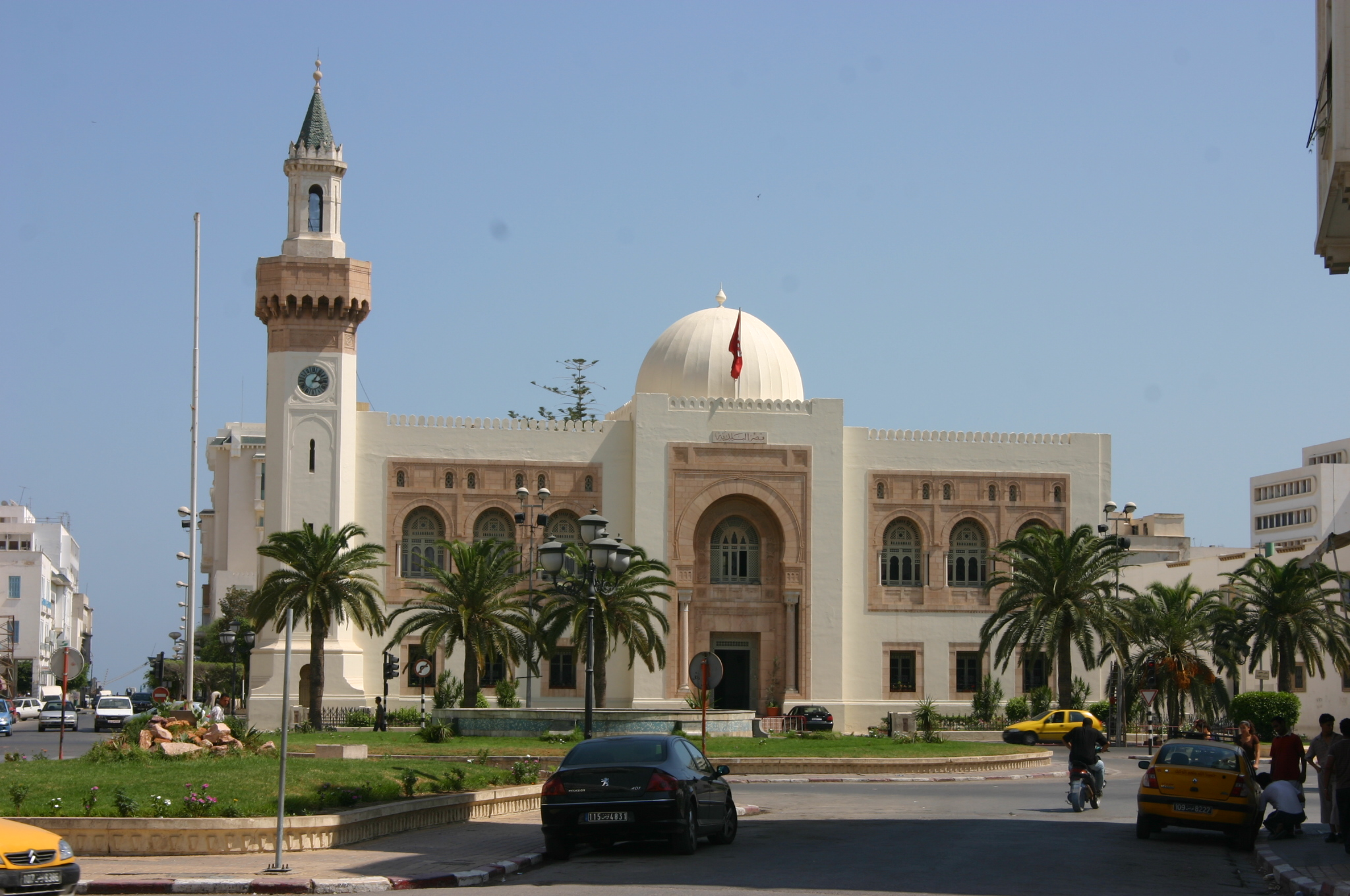

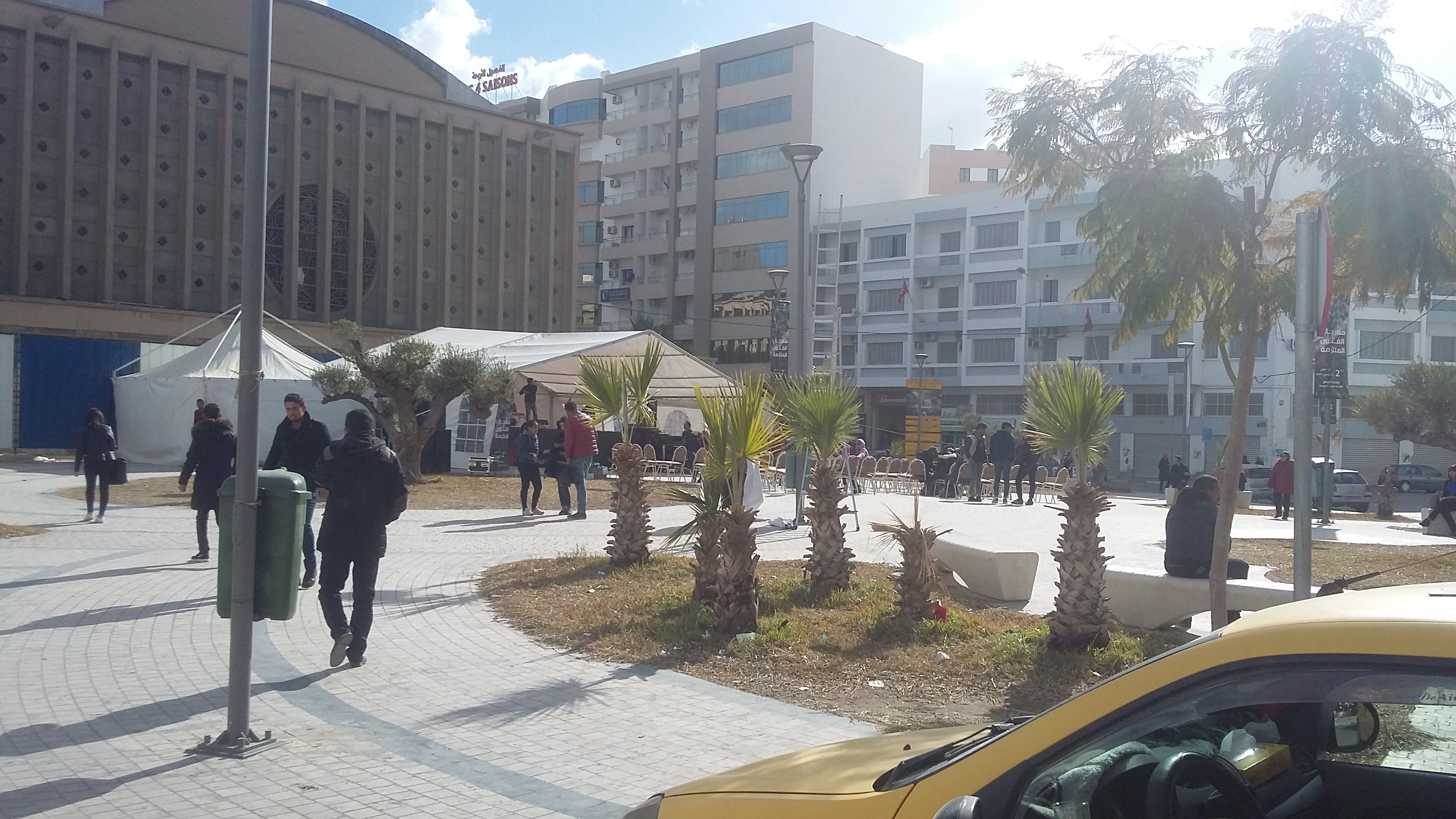

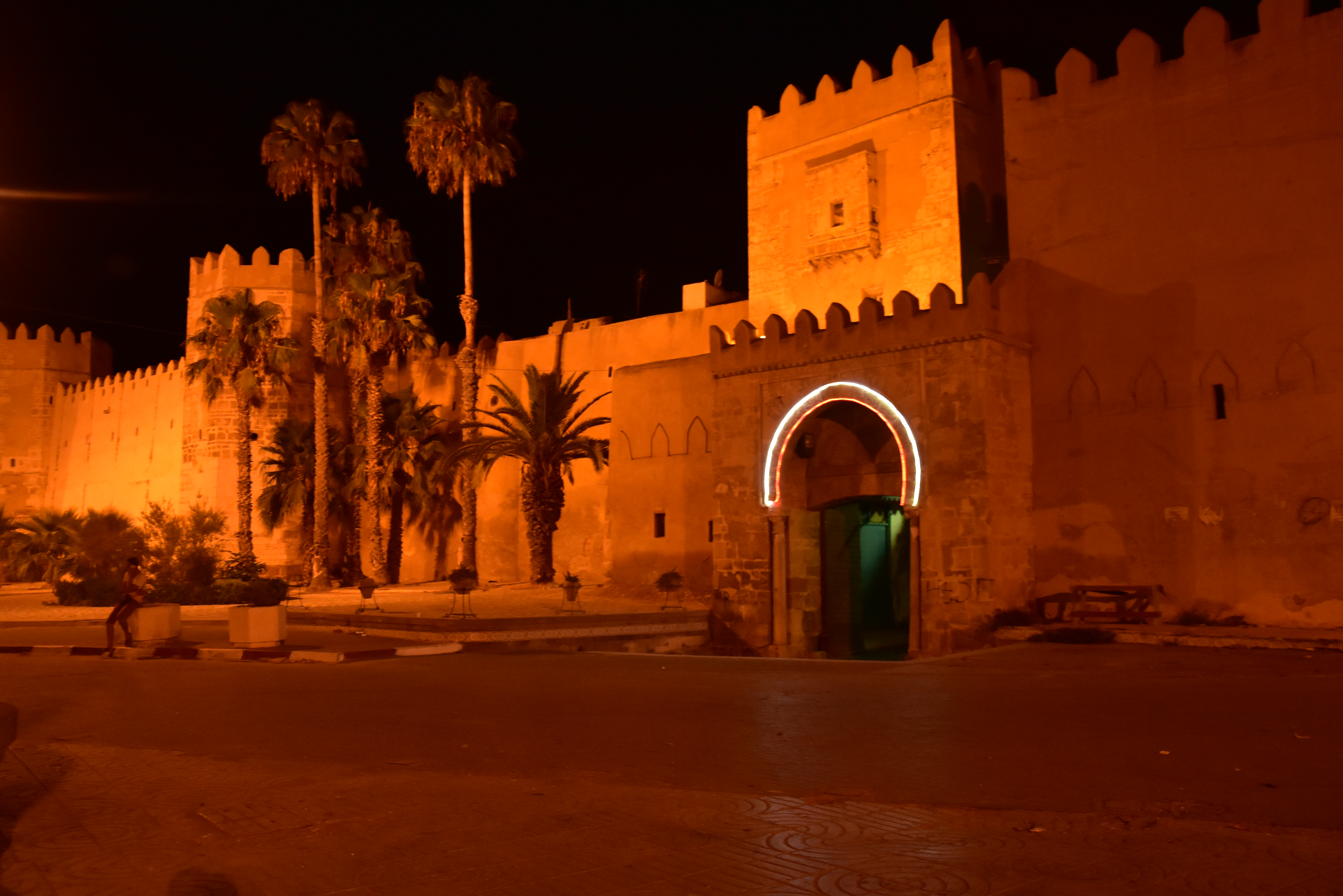

== See also ==
- Fossa regia
- Sfax War Cemetery
- Sufax, a possible etymon of Sfax
- Transport in Tunisia
