= Ghraïba, Tunisia =

Coordinates: 34°30′N 10°13′E

Graïba الغريبة
- Commune and town
- Interactive map of Graïba
- Country: Tunisia
- Governorate: Sfax Governorate

Population (2014)
  - Total: 3,251
- Time zone: UTC+1 (CET)

Graïba is a town and commune in the Sfax Governorate, Tunisia. As of 2004 it had a population of 2,570.

== See also ==
- List of cities in Tunisia
