= Ras Boutria =

Ras Boutria or Ras Bou Tria is a head land of the eastern coast of Tunisia that marks the northern tip of the governorate of Sfax. On the shore there is the archaeological site of ancient Acholla, a Roman city of Africa Proconsularis with ruins of houses Roman amphitheater and baths, and the cities of Louâtre Louzes nearby. it is located at 35°4'33" N and 11°1'40" E.
