= Menzel Chaker =

Menzel Chaker منزل شاكر
- Location within Tunisia
- Coordinates: 34°55′N 10°21′E
- Country: Tunisia
- Governorate: Sfax Governorate

Population (2014 census)
  - Total: 2,309

Menzel Chaker (formerly known as Triaga) is a town in the countryside of Sfax, Tunisia. It is noticed for its production of olives and other fruits, vegetables and produces as Olive Oil.

It is in Sfax delegation, which is in the Sfax Governorate, and nowadays, it contains nearly 2,214 people.

The town served a real function in the Tunisian French war (1881–1956) and during the construction of the state (1956–1964).

== Population ==
2014 Census (Municipal)
Homes	Families	Males	Females	Total
672	565	1122	1156	2278
