= Agareb =

- Commune and town
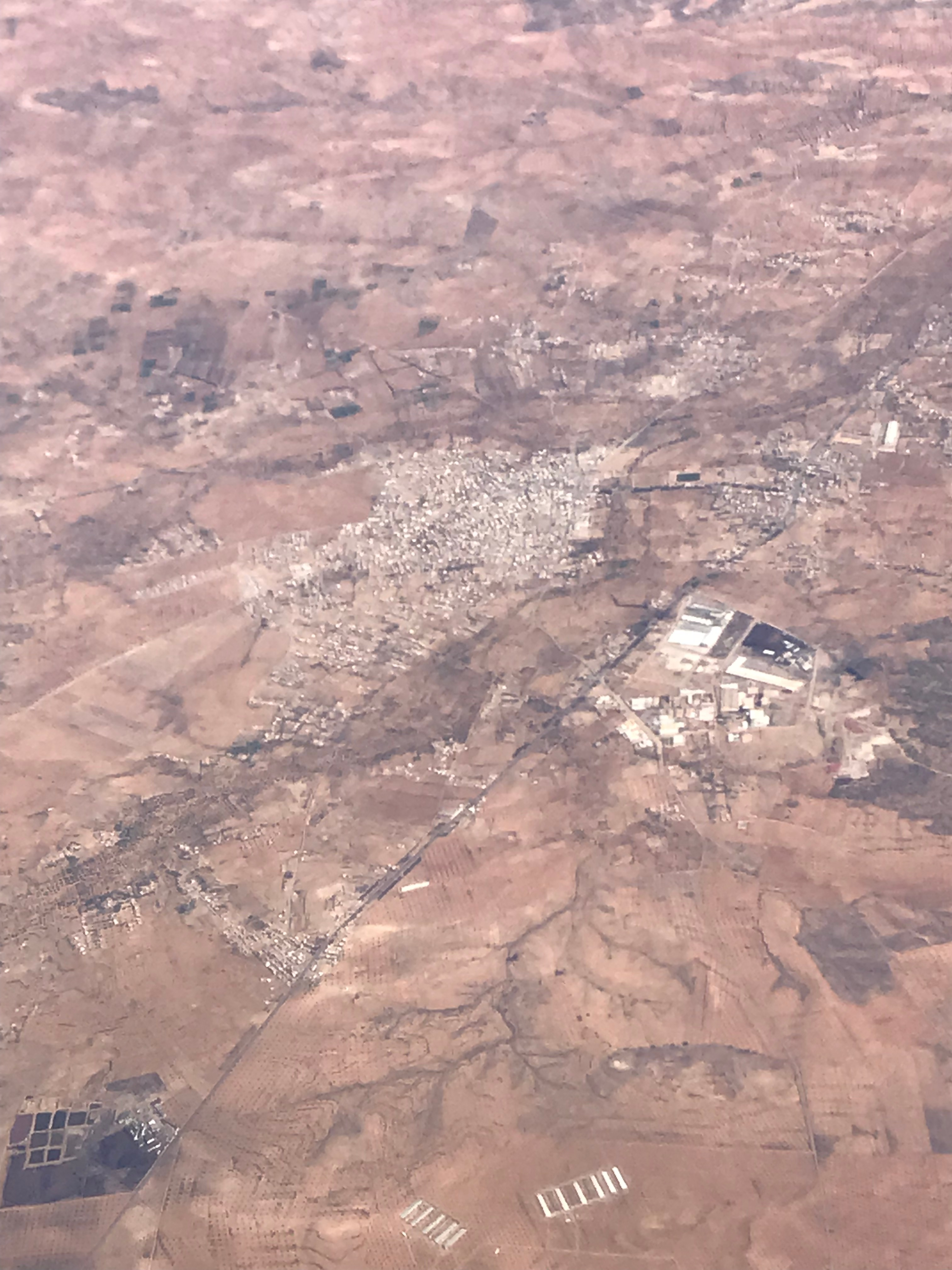
- Aerial view of Agareb

- Location in Tunisia
- Coordinates: 34°26′N 10°19′E
- Country: Tunisia
- Governorate: Sfax Governorate

Population (2014)
  - Total: 11,513
- Time zone: UTC1 (CET)

Agareb (Tunisian Arabic: عقارب) is a coastal town and commune in eastern Tunisia in the Sfax Governorate. It lies 20 km from Sfax. As of 2014 it had a population of 40,943 in both the urban and rural areas.

It was founded by a Marabout of the fourteenth century, named Brahim ben Yaakoub Sid Agareb صيد (أسد) عقارب.

Agareb has a large industrial area which includes one of largest tile plants in Tunisia. Pastoral and olive production are important.

A civil society campaign called Manish Msab ("I am not a landfill") drew national attention to Agareb as "home of the country's most toxic landfill."

== See also ==
- List of cities in Tunisia
