= Bir Ali Ben Khélifa =

- Commune and town
- Location in Tunisia
- Coordinates: 34°44′02″N 10°06′00″E
- Country: Tunisia
- Governorate: Sfax Governorate

Population (2020)
  - Total: 54,143
- Time zone: UTC1 (CET)

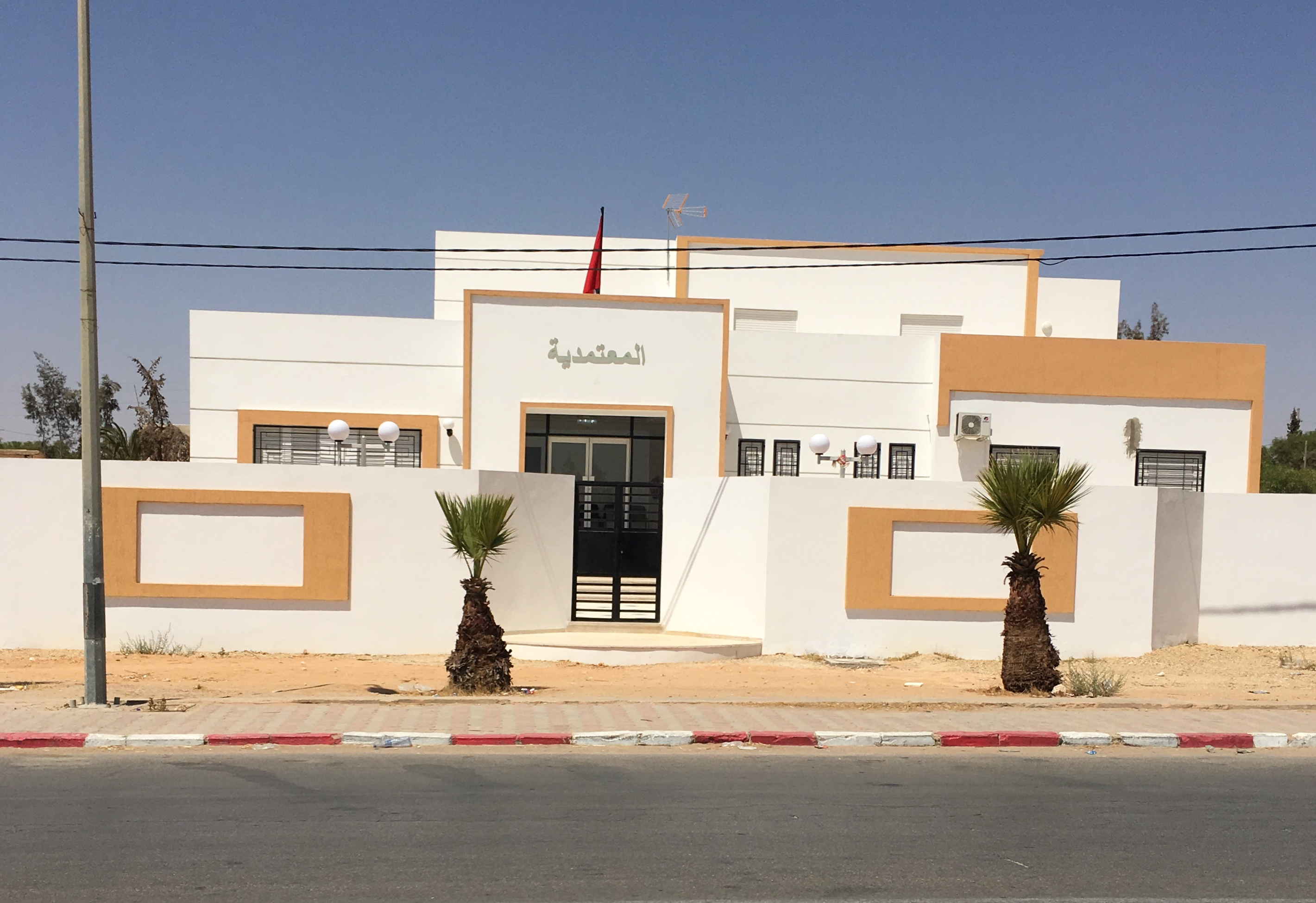
Bir Ali Ben Khalifa headquarters

Bir Ali Ben Khélifa is a town and commune in eastern Tunisia in the Sfax Governorate. It lies 61 kilometres from Sfax. As of 2023 the town had a population of 106,265.
