= El Ain, Tunisia =

Tunisian town

Coordinates: 34°48′N 10°47′E

El Aïn (Tunisian Arabic: العين) is a town and commune located in the Sfax Governorate, 7 kilometers north of Sfax, Tunisia. Its population in 2004 was 38,250.
