= Gremda =

Coordinates: 34°45′N 10°47′E

Gremda قرمدة
- Commune and town
- Interactive map of Gremda
- Country: Tunisia
- Governorate: Sfax Governorate
- Time zone: UTC+1 (CET)

Gremda is a town in the Sfax Governorate, Tunisia. In 2004 Its population is estimated at 36,405.

It is known for hosting the country's largest olive market, which is very active in December, when the harvest is in full swing. The Sfax region is the first olive growing region in the country because more than a third of the country's thousand oil factories are located there.

== See also ==
- List of cities in Tunisia
