= Chihia =

Coordinates: 34°47′42″N 10°44′34″E

Chihia الشيحية
- Commune and town
- Interactive map of Chihia
- Country: Tunisia
- Governorate: Sfax Governorate
- Time zone: UTC+1 (CET)

Chihia is a town and commune in the Sfax Governorate, Tunisia. As of 2004 it had a population of 23,625.

== See also ==
- List of cities in Tunisia
