= El Hencha =

Coordinates: 35.1229°N 10.7415°E

El Hencha الحنشة
- Commune and town
- Interactive map of El Hencha
- Country: Tunisia
- Governorate: Sfax Governorate

Population (2014)
  - Total: 7,594
- Time zone: UTC+1 (CET)

El Hencha is a town and commune in the Sfax Governorate, Tunisia. As of 2004 it had a population of 6,277.

== Population ==
2014 Census (Municipal)
Homes	Families	Males	Females	Total
2291	1892	3677	3898	7575

== See also ==
- List of cities in Tunisia
