= Skhira =

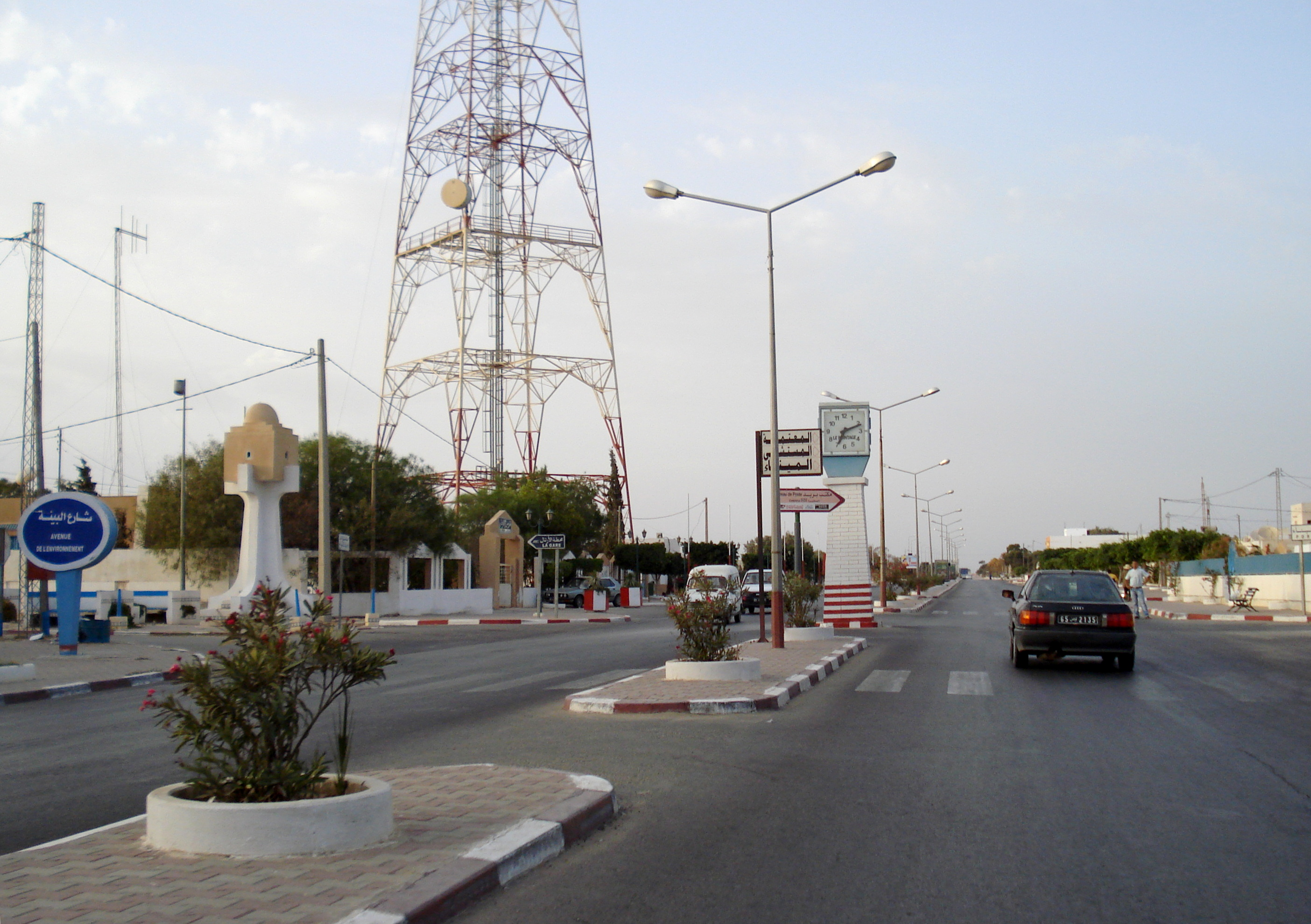

- Location in Tunisia
- Coordinates: 34°18′2″N 10°4′15″E
- Country: Tunisia
- Governorate: Sfax Governorate

Population (2014)
  - Total: 11,912
- Time zone: UTC1 (CET)

Skhira (Arabic: الصخيرة) is a coastal town in Sfax Governorate, central-eastern Tunisia. It is located at around 34°18′2″N 10°4′15″E. It lies on the coast of the Gulf of Gabes. It has a large oil terminal for pipelines coming from the Tunisian and Algerian oilfields. The old village grew in the late nineteenth century as the centre of the export trade in esparto grass, used in the manufacture of paper.
