= Sfax Governorate =

Governorate of Tunisia

Sfax Governorate ولاية صفاقس
- Governorate
- Map of Tunisia with Sfax highlighted

- Subdivisions of Sfax Governorate
- Coordinates: 34°44′N 10°46′E
- Country: Tunisia
- Created: 1956
- Capital: Sfax

Government
  - Governor: Mohamed Hajri (since 2024)

Area
  - Total: 7,545 km^{2} (2,913 sq mi)
  - Rank: Ranked 6th of 24

Population (2024)
  - Total: 1,047,468
  - Rank: Ranked 2nd of 24
  - Density: 138.8/km^{2} (359.6/sq mi)
- Time zone: UTC+01 (CET)
- Postal prefix: 30xx
- Calling code: 74
- ISO 3166 code: TN-61

Sfax (Arabic: ولاية صفاقس, romanized: Wilāyat Ṣafāqis; French: Gouvernorat de Sfax) is one of the governorates of Tunisia. The governorate has a population of 1,047,468 (2024) and an area of 7,545 km^{2}. Its capital is Sfax. It is along the east coast of Tunisia, and includes the Kerkennah Islands.

== Administrative divisions ==
The following sixteen municipalities are located in Sfax Governorate:

3411	Sfax	273,506
3412	Sakiet Ezzit	66,634
3413	Chihia	30,014
3414	Sakiet Eddaïer	52,901
3415	Gremda	49,140
3416	El Aïn	44,258
3417	Thyna	53,349
3418	Agareb	46,652
3419	Jebiniana	36,407
3420	El Hencha	37,041
3421	Menzel Chaker	22,004
3422	Ghraïba	16,678
3423	Bir Ali Ben Khalifa	32,383
3424	Skhira	40,035
3425	Mahares	35,698
3426	Kerkennah	15,382
	El Achech	20,542
	El Amra	35,808
	El Nasr	18,393
	Hadjeb	26,412
	Hazeg - Ellouza	21,957
	Nadhour - Sidi Ali Ben Abed	22,956
	Ouabed - Khazanet	49,318
	Sfax (suburbs/other aggregations if separate)	N/A

The largest airport in the region is the Sfax–Thyna International Airport.

The area code for telephoning to the Sfax governorate is 30.
