= Subdivisions of Tunisia =

Governorates of Tunisia

Tunisia is divided into 24 Wilayah (province) governorates.

The governorates are divided into 264 Mutamadiyat (delegations), and further subdivided into 350 Baladiyah (municipalities) and 2073 Imadats (sectors).

== Districts ==
As decided in Decree 589 of 21 September 2023, 5 administrative districts have been instituted:

- District 1: Bizerte, Beja, Jendouba and Kef Governorates.
- District 2: Tunis, Ariana, Ben Arous, Zaghouan, Manouba and Nabeul Governorates.
- District 3: Siliana, Sousse, Kasserine, Kairouan, Monastir and Mahdia Governorates.
- District 4: Tozeur, Sidi Bouzid, Sfax and Gafsa Governorates.
- District 5: Tataouine, Gabès, Kébili and Médenine Governorates.

== Governorates ==
Key	Governorate	Population of Governorate (2023)	Area of Governorate (km^{2})	Density of Governorate
1	Ariana: 1. Ariana Medina; 2. Ettadhamen; 3. Kalaat El Andalous; 4. Mnihla; 5. Raoued; 6. Sidi Thabet; 7. Soukra	674,025	482	1,195.20
2	Béja: 1. Amdoun; 2. Beja North; 3. Beja South; 4. Goubellat; 5. Mejez El Bab; 6. Nefza; 7. Teboursouk; 8. Testour; 9. Thibar	308,710	3,740	81.02
3	Ben Arous: 1. Ben Arous; 2. Boumhel; 3. El Mourouj; 4. Ezzahra; 5. Fouchana; 6. Hammam Chott; 7. Hammam-Lif; 8. M'Hamdia; 9. Medina Jedida; 10. Mégrine; 11. Mornag; 12. Rades	721,956	761	830.28
4	Bizerte: 1. Bizerte North; 2. Bizerte South; 3. Djoumime; 4. El Alia; 5. Ghar El Melh; 6. Ghezala; 7. Mateur; 8. Menzel Bourguiba; 9. Menzel Jemil; 10. Ras Jebel; 11. Sejenane; 12. Tinja; 13. Utica; 14. Zarzouna	600,012	3,750	151.53
5	Gabès: 1. Gabes Medina; 2. Gabes West; 3. Gabes South; 4. Ghannouch; 5. Hamma; 6. Mareth; 7. Matmata; 8. New Matmata; 9. Menzel Habib; 10. Metouia	407,078	7,166	52.23
6	Gafsa: 1. Belkhir; 2. Gafsa North; 3. Gafsa South; 4. Guetar; 5. Ksar; 6. Mdhilla; 7. Metlaoui; 8. Oum Larais; 9. Redeyef; 10. Sened; 11. Sidi Aich	355,341	7,807	43.21
7	Jendouba: 1. Aïn Draham; 2. Balta; 3. Bousalem; 4. Fernana; 5. Ghardimaou; 6. Jendouba; 7. Jendouba Nord; 8. Oued Mliz; 9. Tabarka	405,167	3,102	129.43
8	Kairouan: 1. Alaa; 2. Bouhajla; 3. Chebika; 4. Chrarda; 5. Haffouz; 6. Hajeb El Ayoun; 7. Kairouan North; 8. Kairouan South; 9. Nasrallah; 10. Oueslatia; 11. Sbikha	601,915	6,712	85.01
9	Kasserine: 1. Ayoun; 2. Ezzouhour; 3. Feriana; 4. Foussana; 5. Hassi El Ferid; 6. Hidra; 7. Jedeliane; 8. Kasserine North; 9. Kasserine South; 10. Majel Belabbes; 11. Sbeitla; 12. Sbiba; 13. Thala	465,832	8,260	53.18
10	Kebili: 1. Douz North; 2. Douz South; 3. Faouar; 4. Kebili North; 5. Kebili South; 6. Souk El Ahed	171,478	22,454	6.99
11	Kef: 1. Dahmani; 2. Es Sers; 3. Jerissa; 4. Kalaa Khasbat; 5. Kalaat Senane; 6. Kef East; 7. Kef West; 8. Ksour; 9. Nebeur; 10. Sakiet Sidi Youssef; 11. Tajerouine	247,741	4,965	48.97
12	Mahdia: 1. Boumerdes; 2. Chebba; 3. Chorbane; 4. El Djem; 5. Hbira; 6. Ksour Essef; 7. Mahdia; 8. Melloulech; 9. Ouled Chamekh; 10. Sidi Alouane; 11. Souassi	448,273	2,966	138.51
13	Manouba: 1. Borj El Amri; 2. Douar Hicher; 3. El Battan; 4. Jedaida; 5. Manouba; 6. Mornaguia; 7. Oued Ellil; 8. Tebourba	426,525	1,137	333.79
14	Medenine: 1. Ben Guerdane; 2. Beni Khedache; 3. Djerba Ajim; 4. Djerba Midoun; 5. Djerba Houmt Souk; 6. Medenine North; 7. Medenine South; 8. Sidi Makhlouf; 9. Zarzis	522,294	9,167	52.31
15	Monastir: 1. Bekalta; 2. Bembla; 3. Beni Hassen; 4. Jammel; 5. Ksar Hellal; 6. Ksibet El Mediouni; 7. Moknine; 8. Monastir; 9. Ouerdanine; 10. Sahline; 11. Sayada-Lamta-Bou Hjar; 12. Teboulba; 13. Zeramdine	611,118	1,019	538.59
16	Nabeul: 1. Beni Khalled; 2. Beni Khiar; 3. Bou Argoub; 4. Dar Chaabane El Fehri; 5. El Mida; 6. Grombalia; 7. Hammam Ghezaz; 8. Hammamet; 9. Haouaria; 10. Kelibia; 11. Korba; 12. Menzel Bouzelfa; 13. Menzel Temime; 14. Nabeul; 15. Soliman; 16. Takelsa	873,824	2,788	282.61
17	Sfax: 1. Agareb; 2. Bir Ali Ben Khelifa; 3. El Amra; 4. El Ghraiba; 5. Hencha; 6. Jebeniana; 7. Kerkennah; 8. Mahres; 9. Menzel Chaker; 10. Sakiet Eddaier; 11. Sakiet Ezzit; 12. Sfax Medina; 13. Sfax West; 14. Sfax South; 15. Skhira; 16. Thyna	1,028,364	7,545	126.63
18	Sidi Bouzid: 1. Bir El Hfay; 2. Jelma; 3. Mazzouna; 4. Meknassi; 5. Menzel Bouzaiene; 6. Ouled Haffouz; 7. Regueb; 8. Sabalat Ouled Asker; 9. Sidi Ali Ben Aoun; 10. Sidi Bouzid East; 11. Sidi Bouzid West; 12. Souk Jedid	459,891	7,405	58.06
19	Siliana: 1. Bargou; 2. Bouarada; 3. El Aroussa; 4. El Krib; 5. Gaafour; 6. Kesra; 7. Makthar; 8. Rouhia; 9. Sidi Bourouis; 10. Siliana North; 11. Siliana South	229,153	4,642	48.06
20	Sousse: 1. Akouda; 2. Bouficha; 3. Enfidha; 4. Hammam Sousse; 5. Hergla; 6. Kalaa Kebira; 7. Kalaa Sghira; 8. Kondar; 9. M'Saken; 10. Sidi Bou Ali; 11. Sidi El Heni; 12. Sousse Jaouhara; 13. Sousse Medina; 14. Sousse Riadh; 15. Sousse Sidi Abdelhamid; 16. Zaouia Ksiba Thrayat	753,670	2,669	252.89
21	Tataouine: 1. Bir Lahmar; 2. Dhiba; 3. Ghomrassen; 4. Remada; 5. Samar; 6. Tataouine North; 7. Tataouine South	152,069	38,889	3.84
22	Tozeur: 1. Degueche; 2. Hazoua; 3. Nefta; 4. Tamaghza; 5. Tozeur	116,316	5,593	22.87
23	Tunis: 1. Bab Bhar; 2. Bab Souika; 3. Bardo; 4. Bouhaira; 5. Carthage; 6. El Khadra; 7. El Menzah; 8. El Ouardia; 9. El Tahrir; 10. Ezzouhour; 11. Hrairia; 12. Jebel Jelloud; 13. Kabaria; 14. La Goulette; 15. La Marsa; 16. Le Kram; 17. Medina; 18. Omrane; 19. Omrane Superieur; 20. Sidi El Bechir; 21. Sidi Hassine; 22. Sijoumi	1,078,412	288	3,052.74
24	Zaghouan: 1. Bir Mchergua; 2. Fahs; 3. Nadhour; 4. Saouaf; 5. Zaghouan; 6. Zriba	191,066	2,820	63.93
