= North East Tunisia =

Geographic and economic region of Tunisia

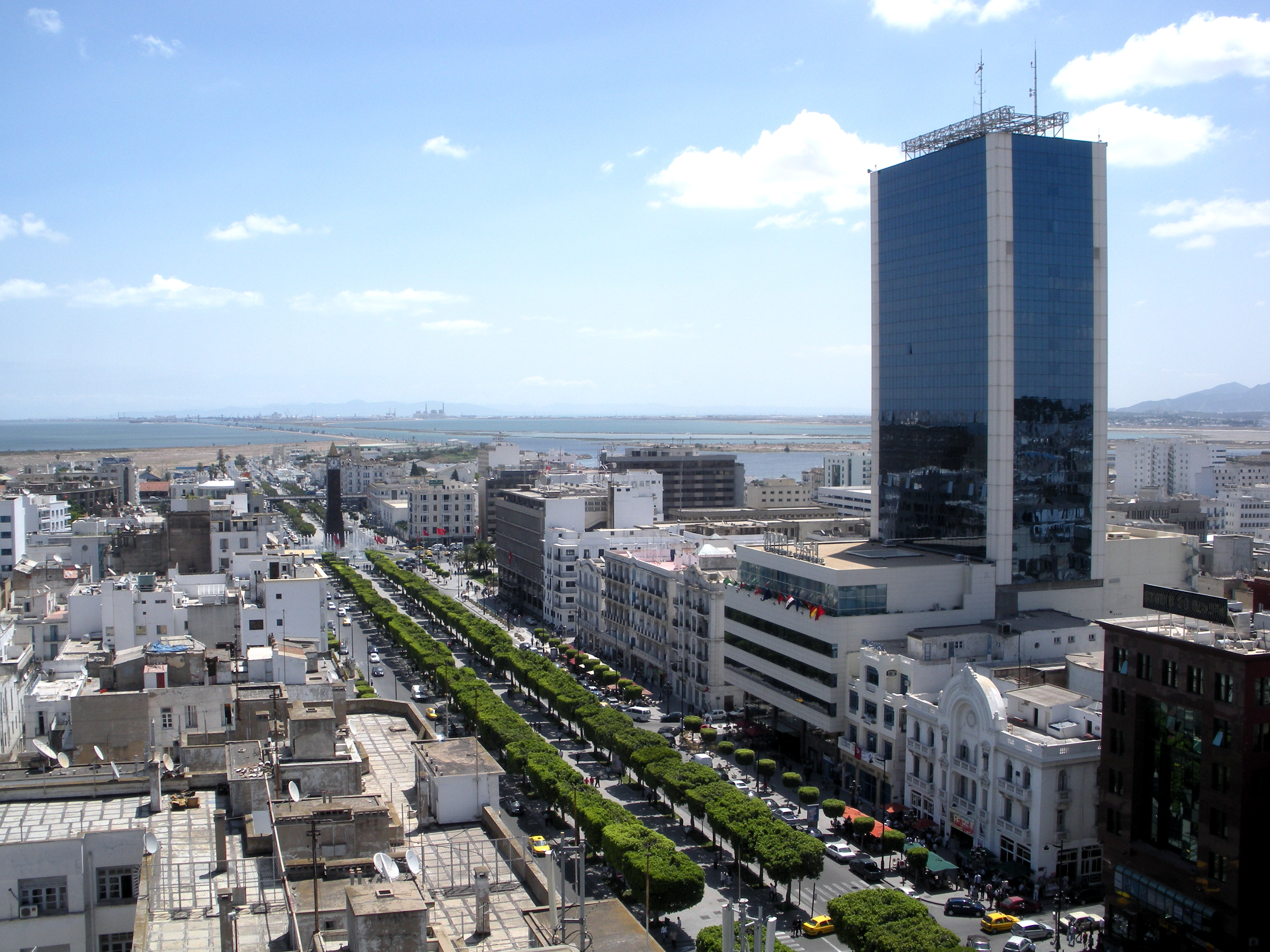
Tunis is the hub city of the region and the capital of Tunisia

North East Tunisia (Arabic: الشمال الشرقي التونسي) is one of the six geographic and economic regions of Tunisia. It consists of seven governorates: Bizerte, Tunis, Aryanah, Menouba, Ben Arous, Zaghouan and Nabeul. At the 2014 Census, the region had a population of 4,176,779. That makes it the most populated region of the country and it has the highest density with 347 people per square kilometer.

== Geography ==
The North East region is located in the extreme north of the country and Africa, Measuring an area of 12,032 km square most of its landscape are Flat Rich of agriculture activities, bounded to the west by the North West region Governorate of Béja, to the north and east by the Mediterranean Sea, and in the south with the Central East region. The region has a coastline length of nearly 227 km.

There are four national parks in the North East, three of them are entirely in the region and one is partially in it: Boukornine National Park is between the Nabeul Governorate and Ben Arous Governorate, Ichkeul National Park in the Bizerte Governorate, Jebel Chitana-Cap Négro National Park between Bizerte Governorate and Béja Governorate and finally Zembra National Park which is an archipelago of Zembra island and Zembretta island in Nabeul Governorate.

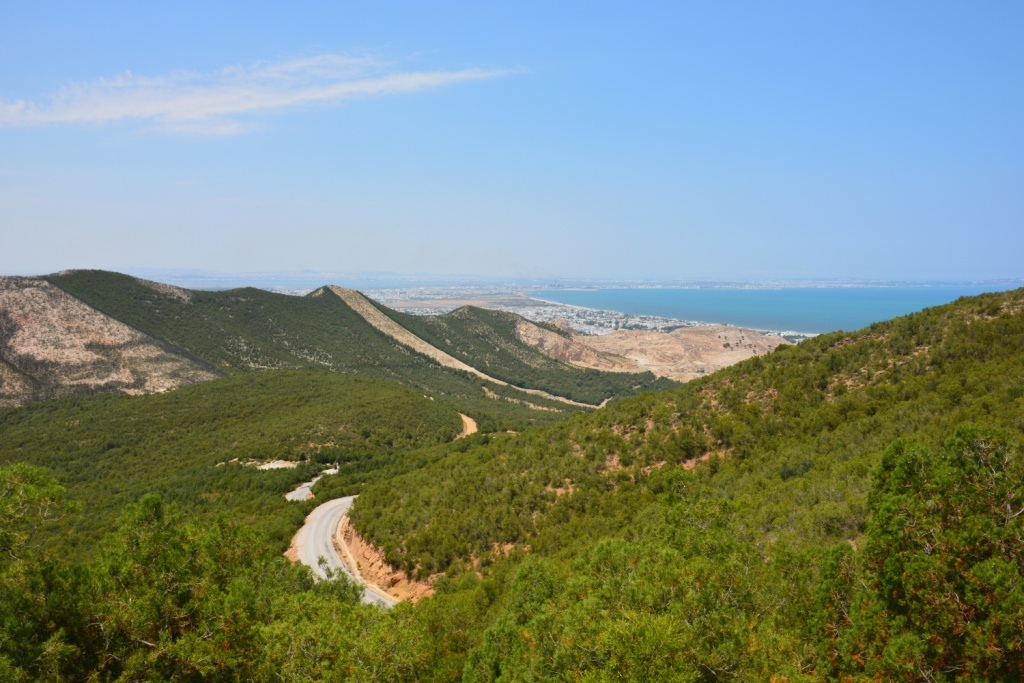
Boukarnin National Park

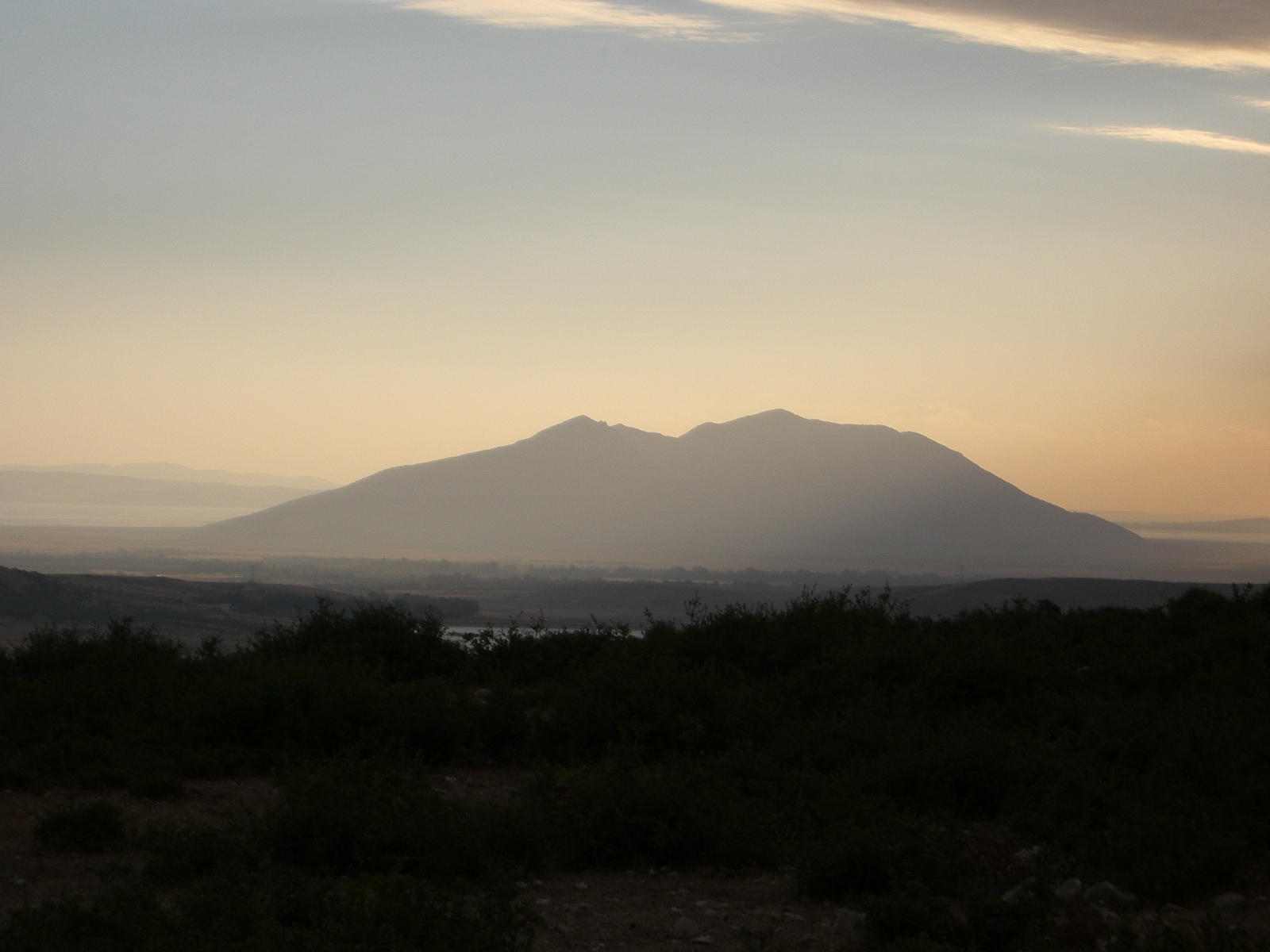
Ichkiil National Park

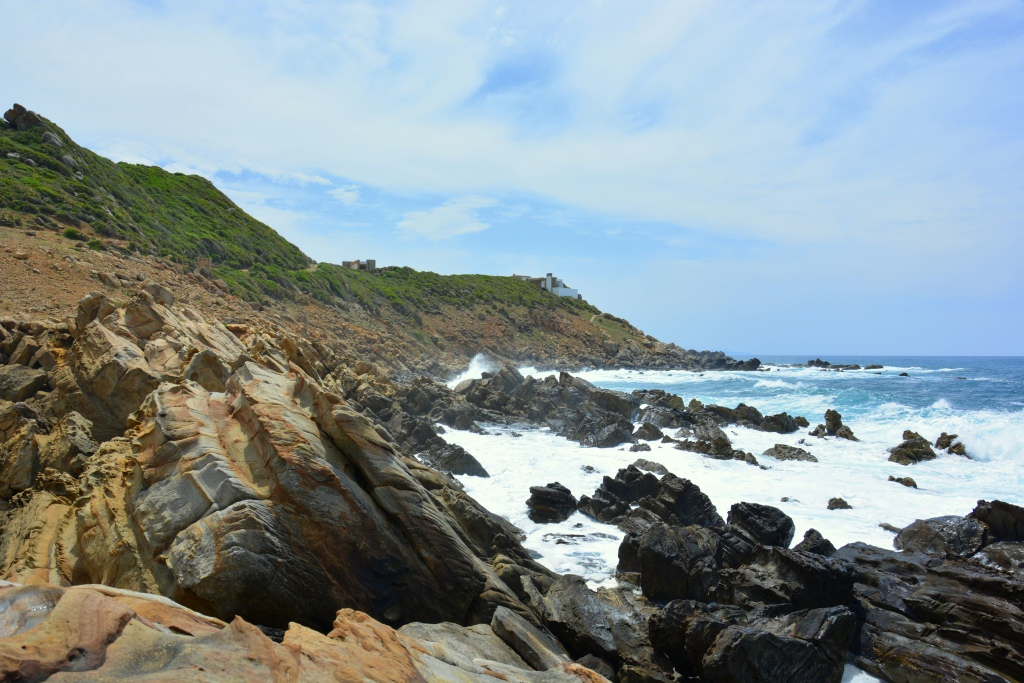
Jbel Chitana Cap Negro

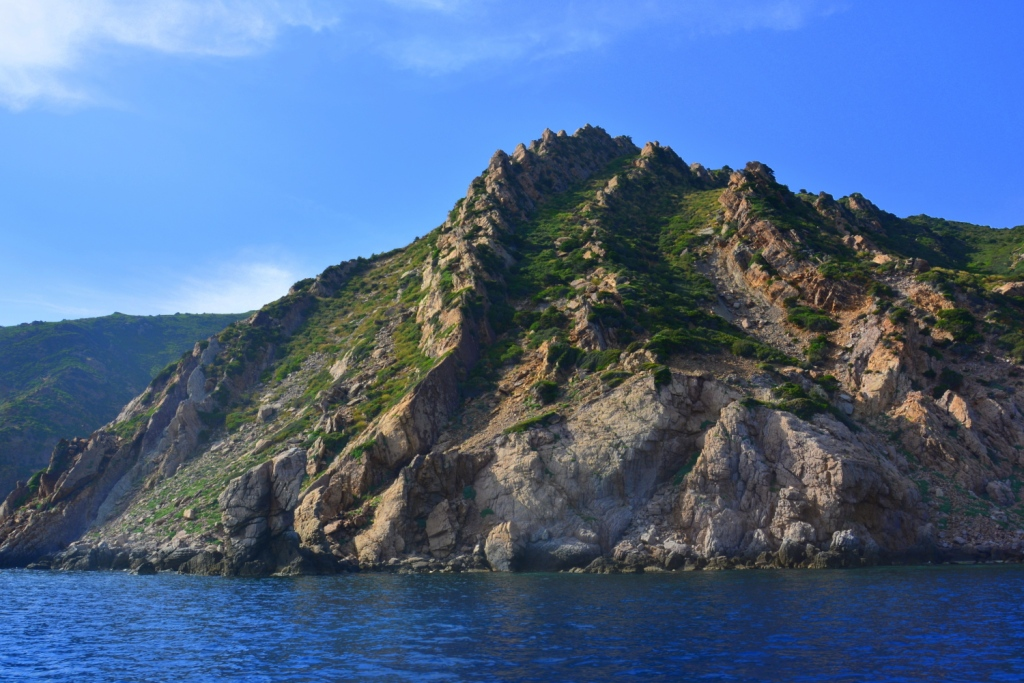
Zembra and Zembretta

== Demographics ==
With 4,176,779 people, the North East is the most populated region in the country. The most populated governorates of the North East are:

Governorate	Area kilometer square	Population (2014)	Population density	Largest town/city
Tunis	346 km2	1.056.247	3,100/km^{2}	Tunis (638,845)
Nabeul	2,788 km2	787,920	280/km^{2}	Hammamet (97,579)
Ben Arous	761 km2	631,842	800/km^{2}	Mohamedia-Fouchana (106,167)
Ariana	482 km2	576,088	1,200/km^{2}	Ettadhamen-Mnihla (196,298)
Bizerte	3,750 km2	568,219	150/km^{2}	Bizerte (142,966)
Menouba	1,137 km2	379,518	330/km^{2}	Douar Hicher (82,532)
Zaghouan	2,768 km2	176,945	64/km^{2}	El Fahs (23,556)

=== Cities and towns ===
There are several cities and towns with populations that exceed 100,000. These are the 10 most populated cities:

City	Population (2014)	Population density
Tunis	638,845	3,004 hab./km^{2}
Ettadhamen-Mnihla	196,298	8,200 hab./km^{2}
Bizerte	142,966	3,363 hab./km^{2}
La Soukra	129,693	No data
Aryanah	114,486	636 hab./km^{2}
Mohamedia-Fouchana	106,167	No data
El Mourouj	104,538	4,864 hab./km^{2}
Hammamet	97,579	2,700 hab./km^{2}
Raoued	94,691	No data
Douar Hicher	82,532	No data

=== Transportation ===
The region is linked through many networks of roads. National roads are the most used ones despite been Risky in winter. They pass many rivers and water dams and are often narrow with only two-way. Many national roads may be blocked due to flooding. Highways are considered to be the best choice of travelling, starting in Bizerte with A4 motorway reaching Tunis then stretching through A1 motorway passing Ben Arous, Zaghouan and Hammamet to finally get to Nabeul.

There is also a train connecting Bizerte to Tunis then stretched from Tunis to Hammamet but the trains are old and slow with a travel speed of about 65 km/h.

The Tunis–Carthage International Airport is the most important and busiest Tunisian airport. It is connected to other Tunisian airports through Tunisair Express.

There is also Métro léger de Tunis light metro rail in Tunis that covers the Grand Tunis area with a 43 kilometers of line and 67 stations. It has a capacity to carry more than 600,000 persons a day.

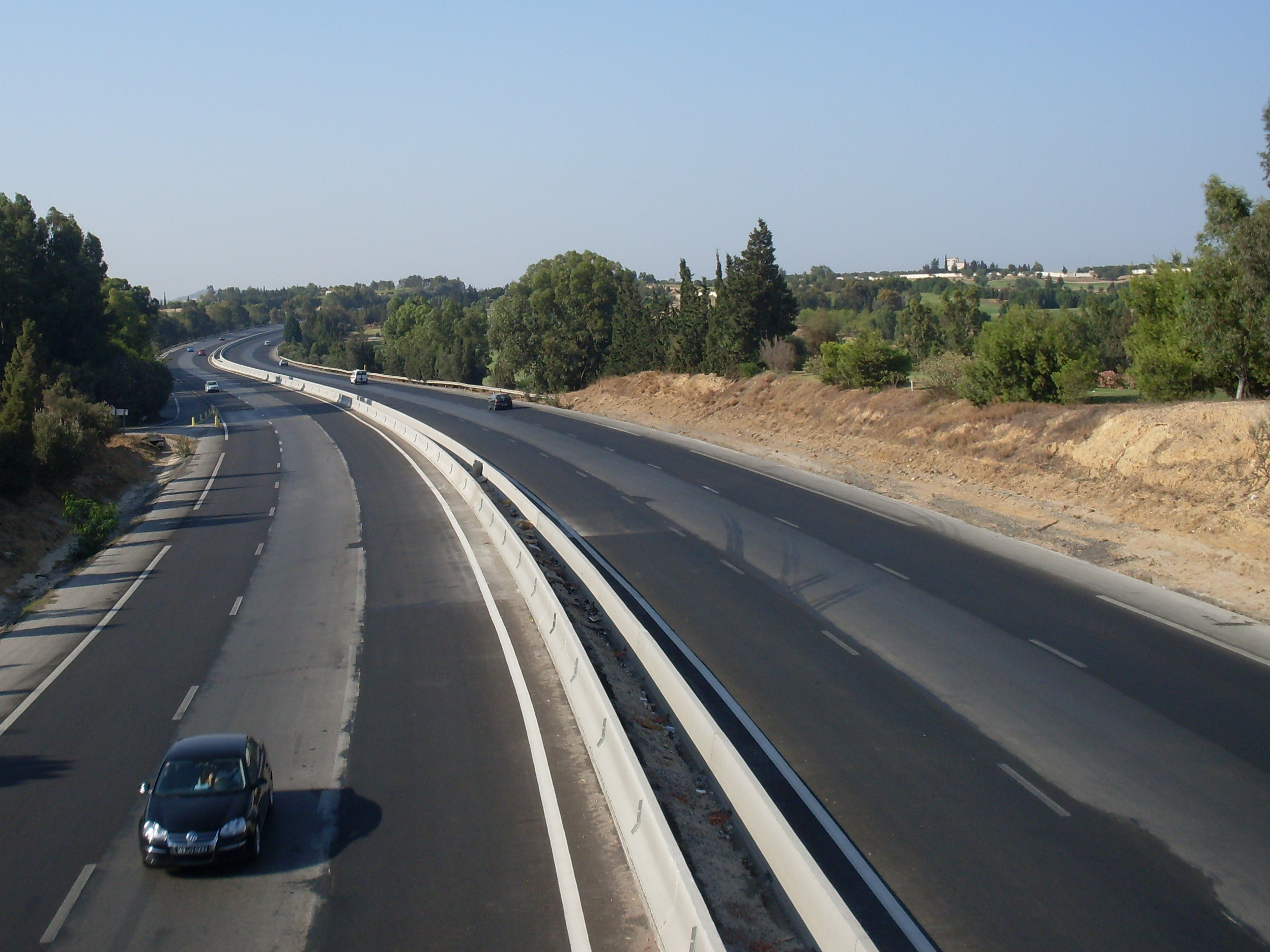
Tunis Hammamet Highway

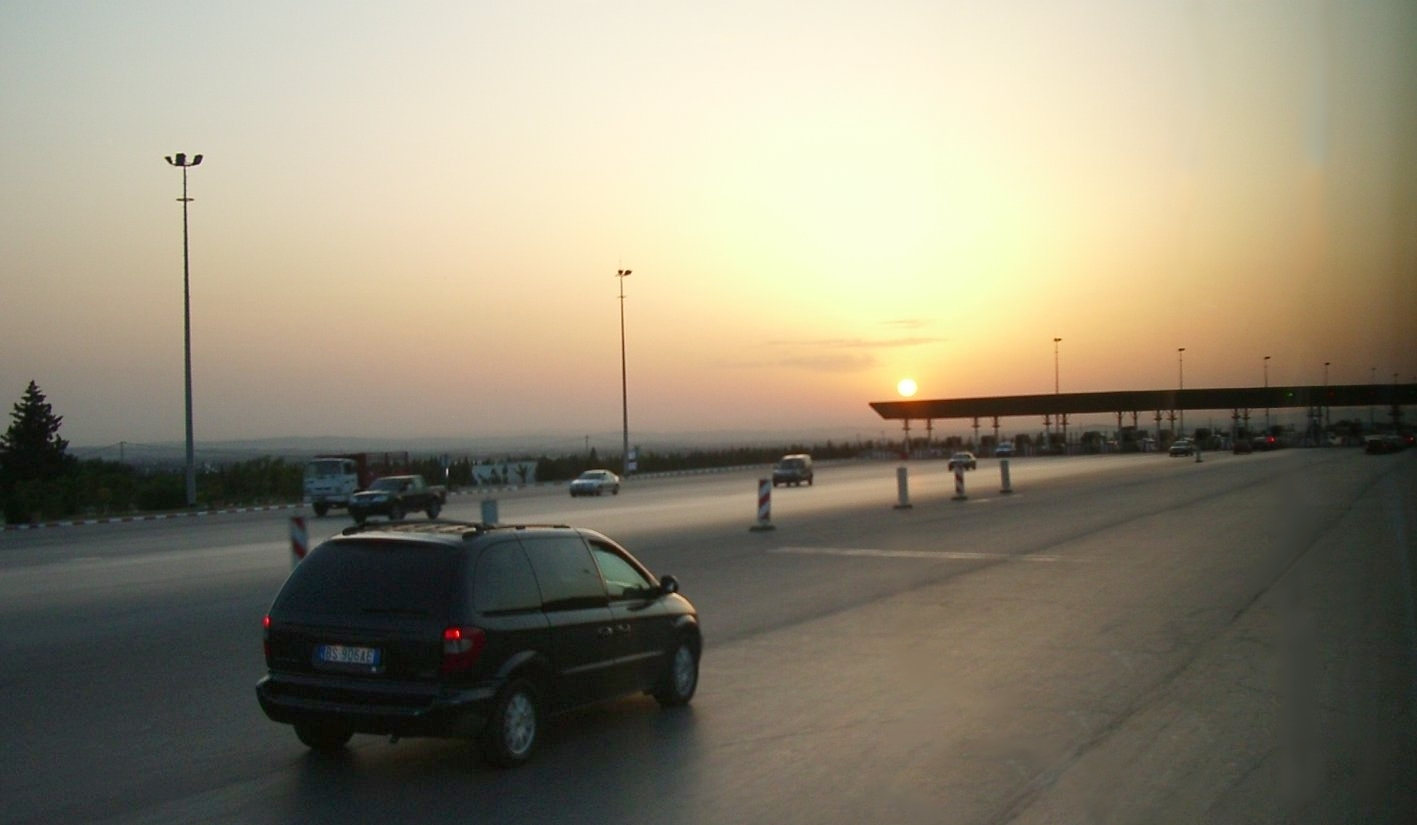
A1 toll in Mornag at sunset

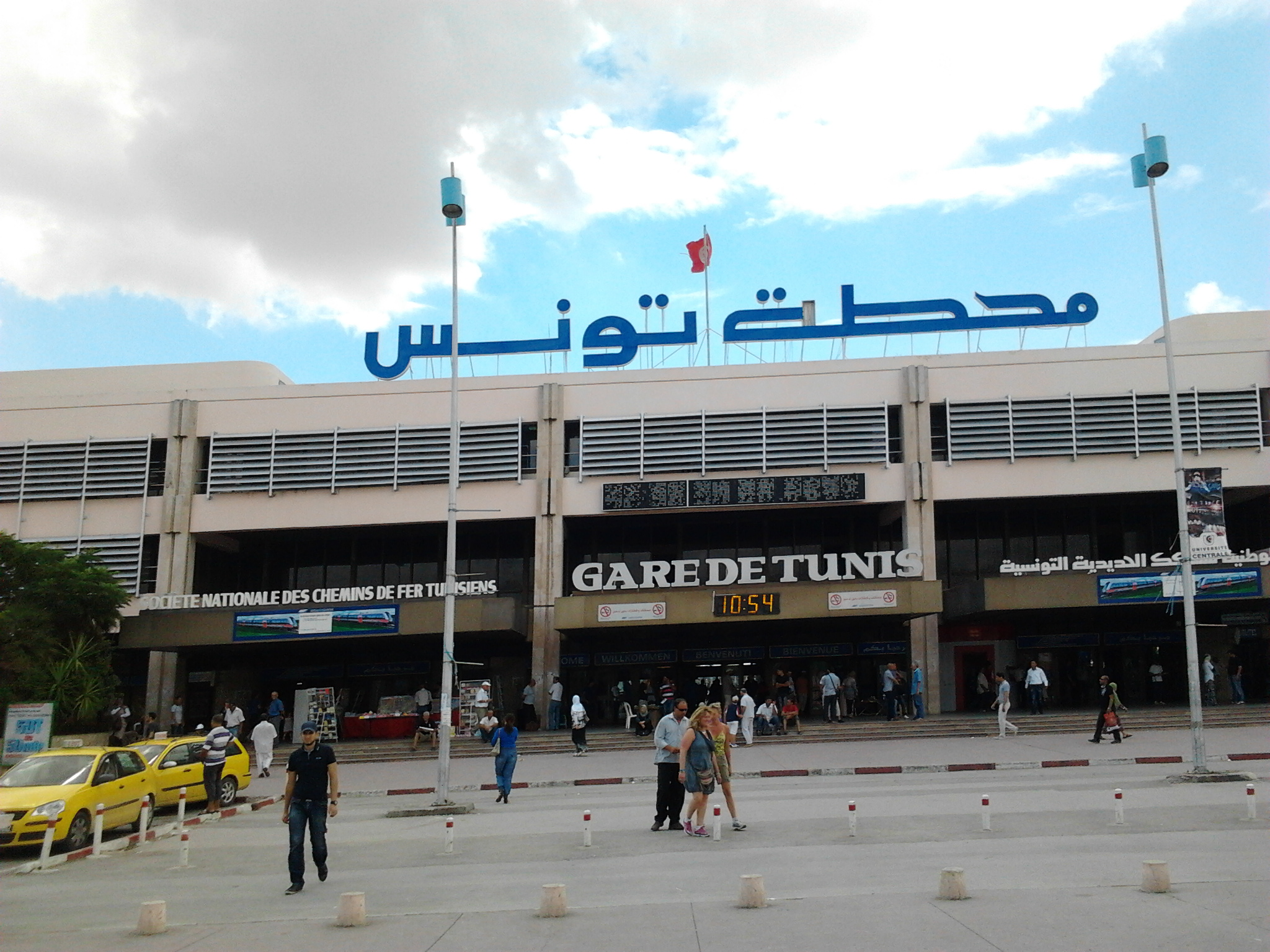
Tunis train station

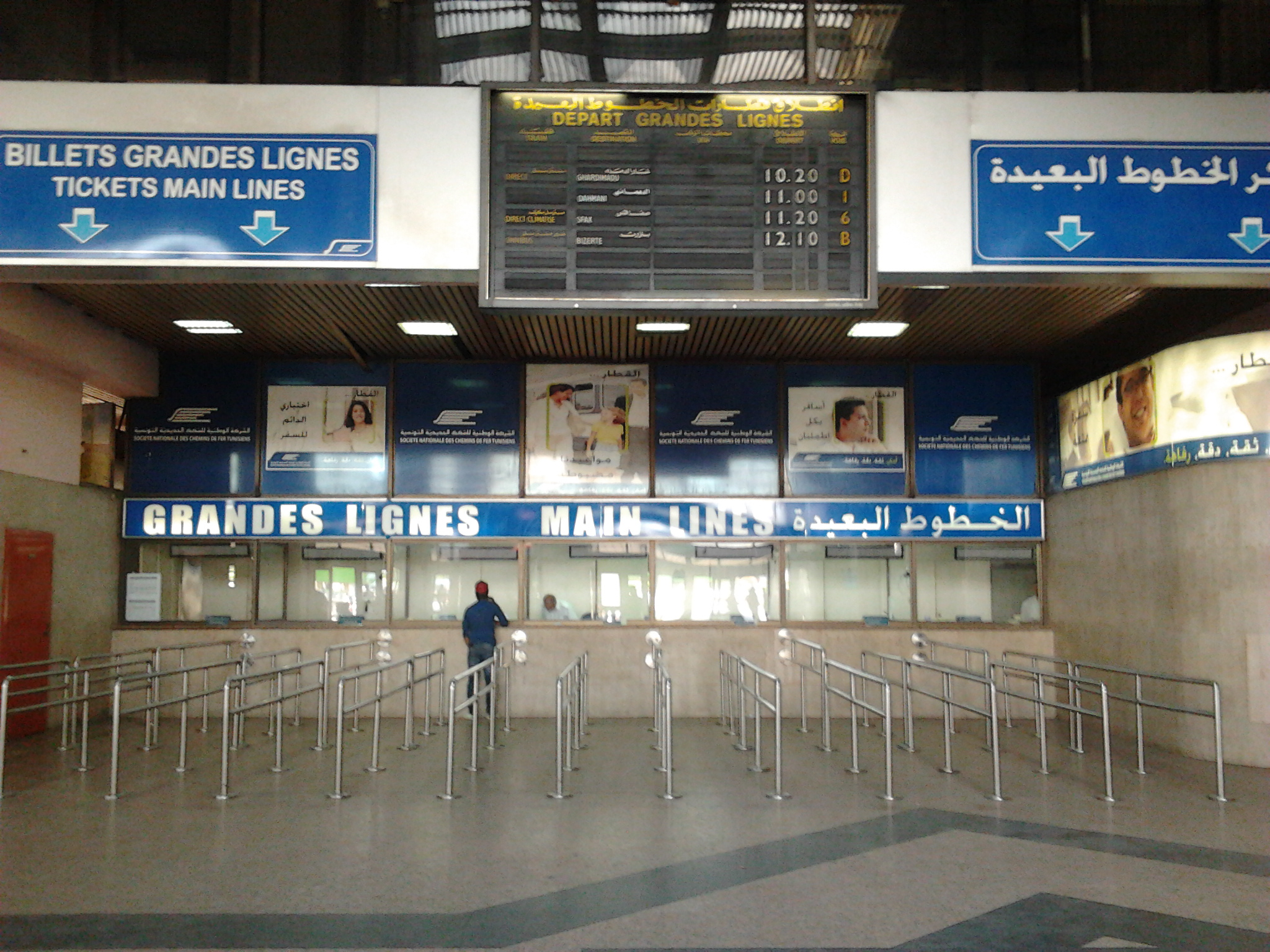
Inside Tunis train station

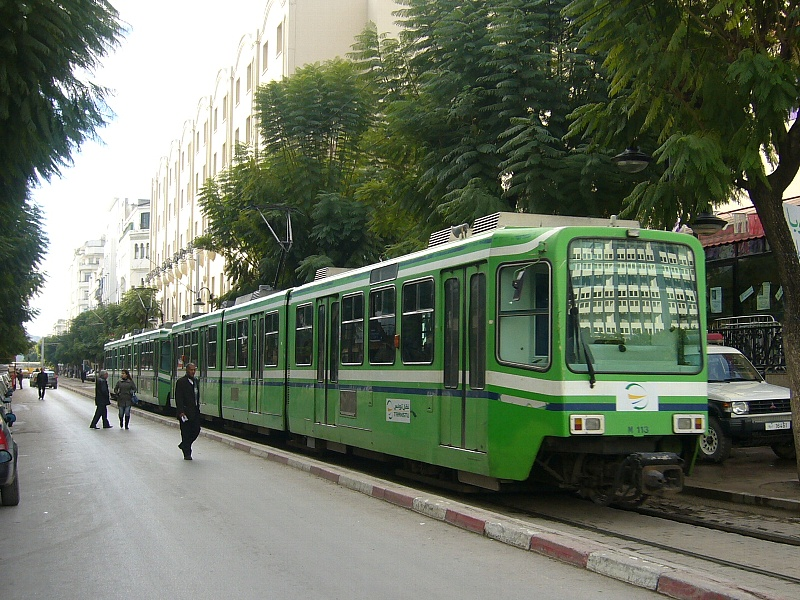
An old Metro vehicle

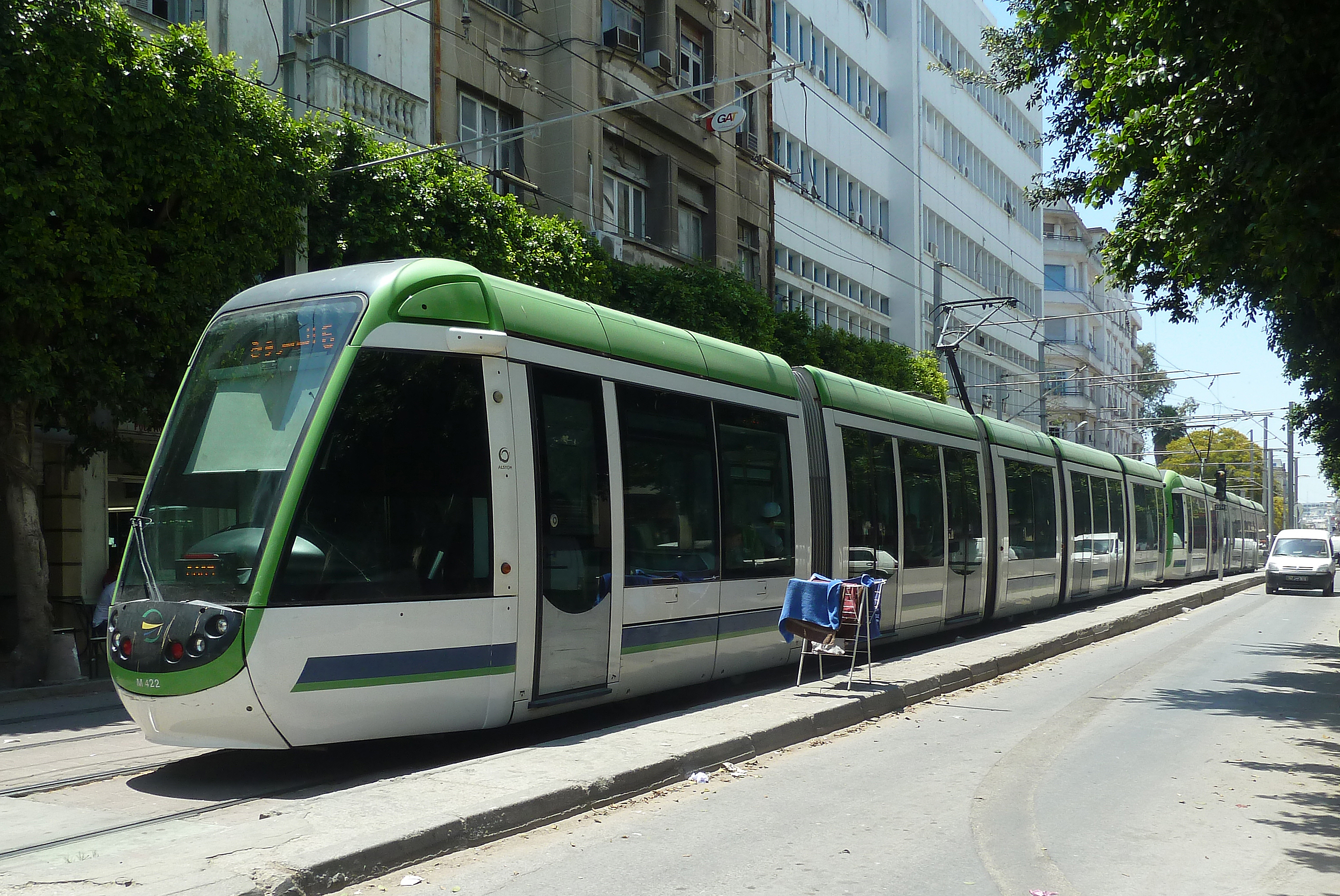
Bidirectional Alstom Citadis 302 on Line 6 in June 2012

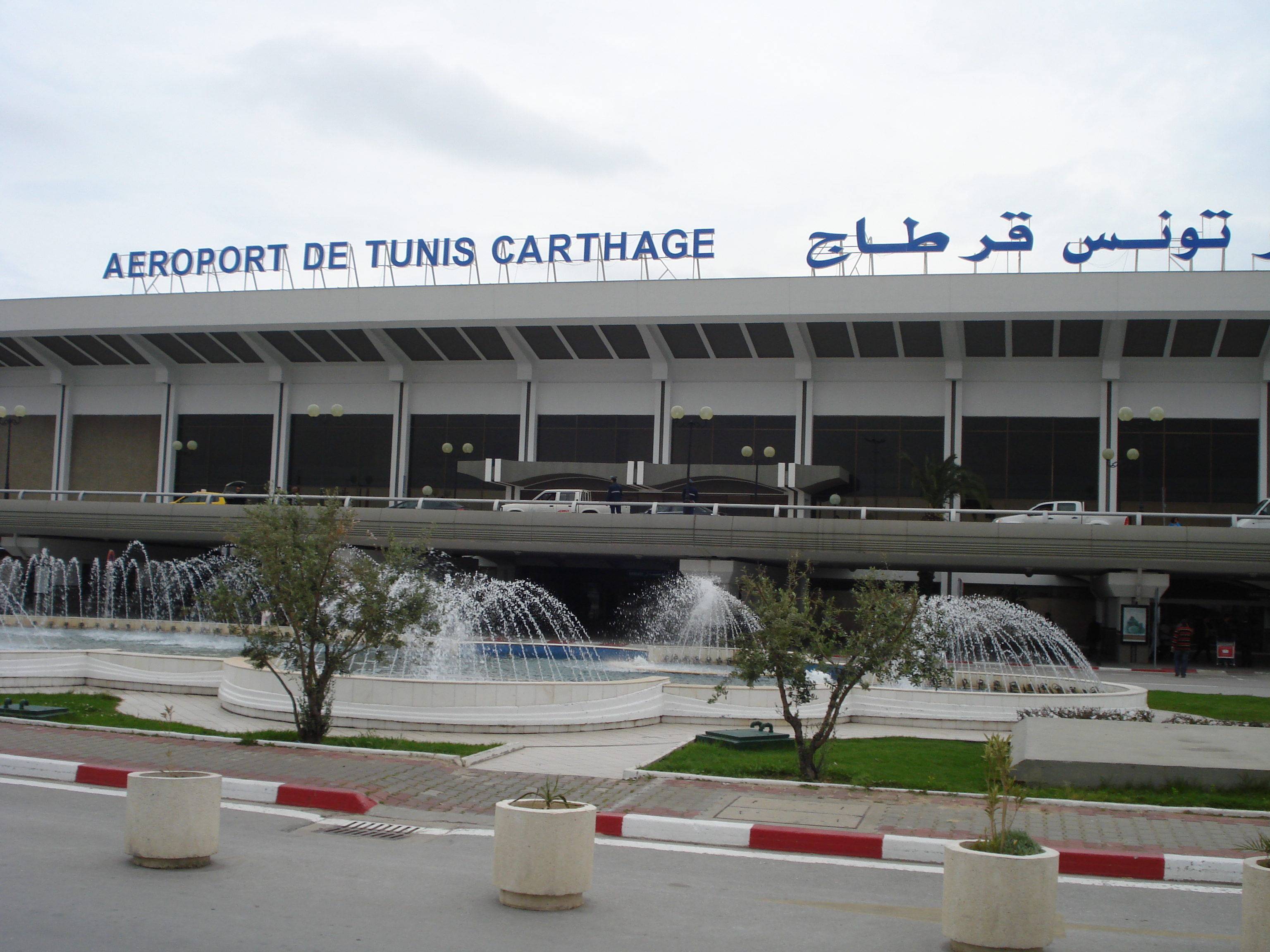
Tunis-Carthage International Airport

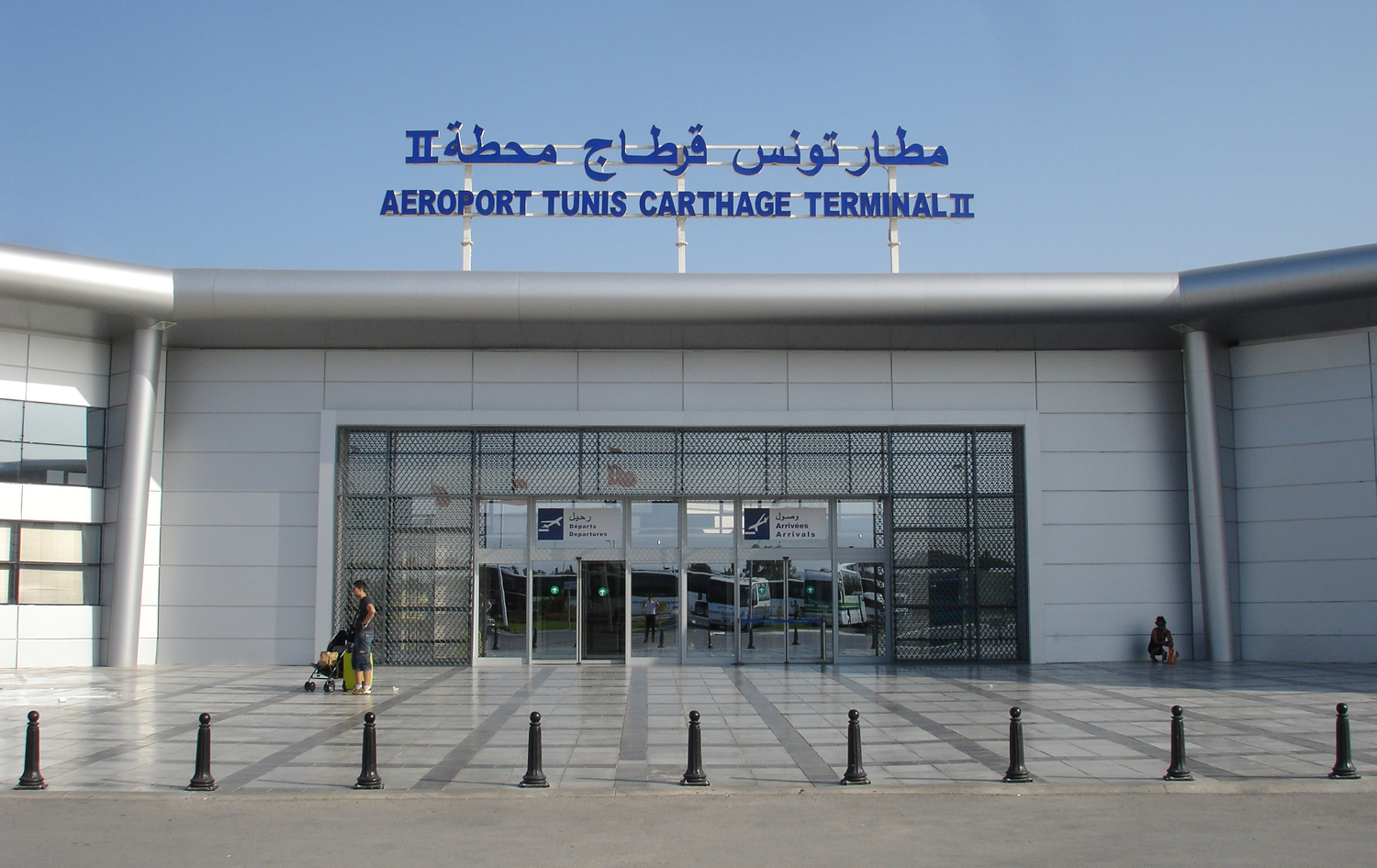
Carthage airport Terminal 2

== See also ==
- Grand Tunis
- List of development projects in Tunisia
