= Ettadhamen =

Municipality in Ariana Governorate, Tunisia

Coordinates: 36.838°N 10.100°E

Ettadhamen التضامن
- City
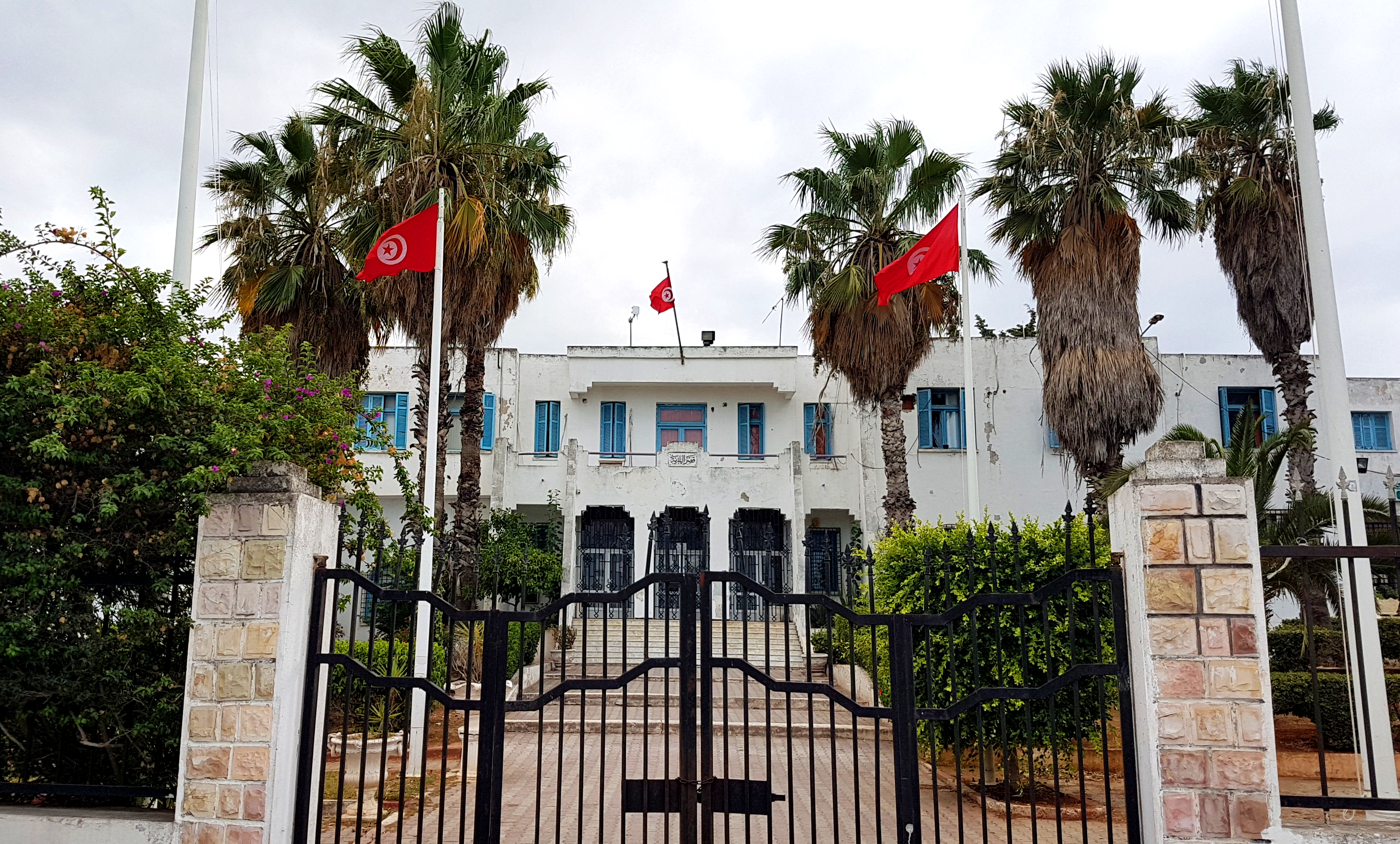
- Seat of the municipality of Ettadhamen

- Location within Tunisia
- Country: Tunisia
- Governorate: Ariana Governorate
- Time zone: UTC+1 (CET)

Ettadhamen (Arabic: التضامن, romanized: at-Taḍāmun) is a municipality and commune in the Ariana Governorate, part of the Greater Tunis metropolitan area. It was formed in 2016 when the municipality of Ettadhamen-Mnihla was split, with Mnihla becoming a separate entity. The name "Ettadhamen" means "solidarity." The municipality was established in the 1950s to accommodate populations from internal migration. Initially an informal settlement, it was later incorporated into the urban planning of the Tunisian capital's metropolitan area.

== History ==
Ettadhamen was formed by waves of internal migration during the early 1950s, largely composed of poor small farmers and unemployed individuals who moved to Tunisia's capital area. Hundreds of families left impoverished villages in the northwestern governorates (Siliana, Beja, Jendouba, and Le Kef) in search of better opportunities in the suburbs of Tunis.

The youth of the neighborhood played a significant role in the 2011 revolution that led to the overthrow of President Zine el-Abidine Ben Ali, driven by a desire to improve their challenging living conditions. However, these aspirations did not result in immediate change. While traces of those who contributed to the uprising can still be seen on the walls of buildings and surrounding alleys, the region continues to lack significant infrastructure development. This ongoing neglect has contributed to social issues, including rising crime rates, drug trafficking, and high levels of frustration and economic hardship, particularly among young people, many of whom have sought opportunities through illegal migration. Additionally, there has been a rise in militant Islamist movements, with some jihadist cells emerging, especially among the youth.

== Economy ==
The political transition of the Tunisian state after the 2011 revolution contributed to the state of economic stagnation, with an increase in the number of university graduates and an absence of a comprehensive strategy offering radical solutions to reduce the unemployment rate. This is estimated at more than 60%, while the poverty rate is 70%, because the monthly income of thousands of families does not exceed 200 dinars, while it reached 27.88% for higher graduates in 2014.

== Culture ==
=== Youth centers ===
Ettadhamen has a multidisciplinary complex whose mission is to train young people and develop their talents in a number of fields, such as music, theater and reading. It was inaugurated by President Béji Caïd Essebsi in 2018.

=== Summer festivals ===
The district has its own festival held annually from the end of July to the first week of August. In 2019, the local community celebrated the 33rd edition of the festival which is considered one of the few entertainment events available. The festival brings together activities of all types, but above all concerts and sometimes plays.

== Sport ==
According to a study carried out by a group of sociologists on young people from Douar Hicher and Ettadhamen, 55% of active associations are focusing on sports while are 18.5% non-profit, 10.3% are cultural and 10.5% religious. This study states that only one in four young people know at least one active association in their neighborhood.

Sports clubs carry out their activities in the 14th of January Hall or at the municipal stadium. The 14th of January Hall, built in 2003 at a cost of 850,000 dinars, hosts wrestling, weightlifting, and boxing training sessions and competitions. The municipal stadium, completed in 1989 with an investment of 120,000 dinars, was renovated in 2008 at a cost of 150,000 dinars. These investments reflect the strategy adopted by successive governments to promote local sports activities and invest in the human potential of the population.

== Notable people ==
- Ghofrane Belkhir, Weightlifter
- Skander Labidi, Footballer
