= Battle of Touayel =

- Part of Islamic State insurgency in Tunisia
Date	17–19 October 2013
Location	Goubellat, Tunisia
Result	Tunisian victory

Belligerents
Tunisia	(Islamic State) ISIS

Strength
Unknown	20–25

Casualties and losses
2	13

The Battle of Touayel is a confrontation between Tunisian law enforcement forces and jihadists that took place in Tunisia in October 2013.

== Background ==
In October 2013, Tunisian authorities received intelligence indicating the presence of an armed group in a house in the Goubellat delegation. This area, situated in the Béja governorate, approximately fifty kilometers west of Tunis, became a focal point for security concerns. National guard personnel were dispatched on October 17 to verify this information, leading to a violent confrontation in the village of Dour Ismaïl. Two guards lost their lives, and another was injured as the armed individuals managed to escape. This marked the initiation of jihadist activity in the region.

== Battle ==
The subsequent day witnessed an unsettling incident at the El Aouina barracks during a ceremony honoring the fallen national guards. President Moncef Marzouki, Prime Minister Ali Larayedh, and Constituent Assembly President Mustapha Ben Jaafar faced derision from police officers associated with the Syndicate of Internal Security Forces. After enduring ridicule for about twenty minutes, the three leaders departed without making any statements. Minister of the Interior Lotfi Ben Jeddou was the only one able to attend the ceremony.

On the same day, Tunisian forces, comprising elements from the anti-terrorism brigade, national guard, and the army, launched an offensive on Djebel Touayel, believed to house 20 to 25 jihadists. The operation commenced with an aerial bombardment followed by infantry progression, illustrating the intensity of the conflict.

== Aftermath ==
The day after the military operation, the Ministry of the Interior reported four "terrorists" killed in the Djebel Touayel clashes. However, the toll was later revised upward, with authorities acknowledging nine deaths. According to a subsequent report from the Ministry of Defense, thirteen jihadists were killed, and seven charred bodies were discovered during sweep operations. Tunisian government forces sustained four injuries, including two army corporals and a lieutenant from the national guard commandos. A more severely injured sergeant was urgently transported to the military hospital in Tunis.

Colonel Major Taoufik Rahmouni, the Ministry of Defense spokesperson, revealed that near a house rented by the jihadists, two tons of raw material for explosives, ammunition crates, and vision equipment were discovered. The operation concluded on October 19, with thirteen jihadist casualties, two insurgents surrendering, and others captured, forming a somber aftermath to this complex and challenging security situation.
