= List of ports in Tunisia =

This list of Ports and harbours in Tunisia details the ports, harbours around the coast of Tunisia.

== List of ports and harbours in Tunisia ==
Port/Harbour name	Governorate	Town name	Coordinates	UN/Locode	Max. draught (m)	Max. deadweight (t)	Remarks
Port of Bizerte	Bizerte Governorate	Bizerte	37°15′N 09°51′E	TNBIZ	10.4	115878	Medium-sized port
Port of Radès	Ben Arous Governorate	Radès	36°48′N 10°17′E	TNRDS	10.3	58000	Large-sized port
Port of Sousse	Sousse Governorate	Sousse	35°49′N 10°38′E	TBSUS	8.5	27174	Medium-sized port
Port of Sfax	Sfax Governorate	Sfax	34°43′N 10°46′E	TNSFA	10.1	63963	Medium-sized port
Port of Gabès	Gabès Governorate	Gabès	33°54′N 10°06′E	TNGAE	10.3	63878	Medium-sized port
