= Ariana, Tunisia =

City in Tunisia

Ariana أريانة
- City
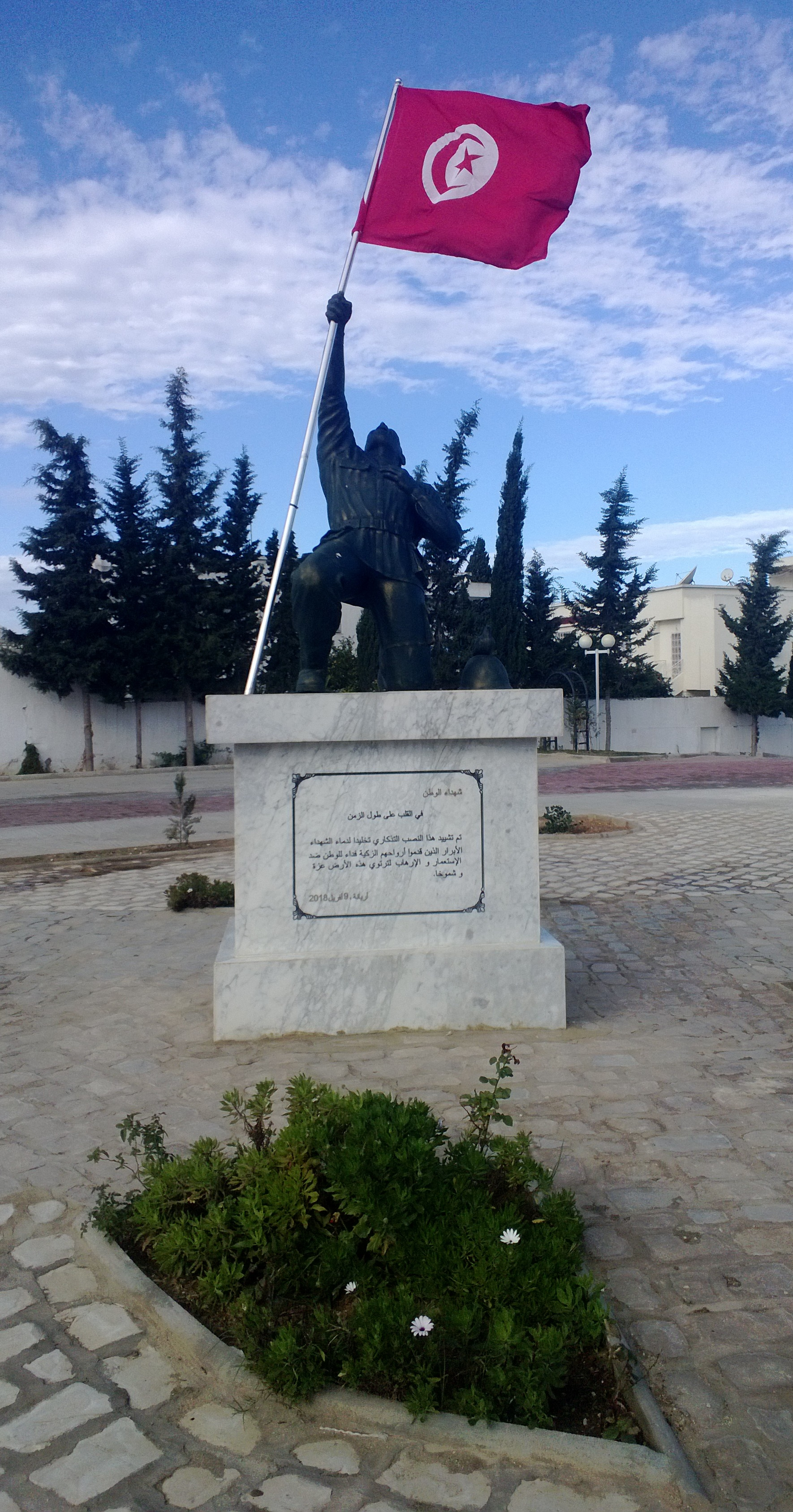
- Statue for martyrs in Ariana
- Nickname: City of Roses
- Location in Tunisia
- Coordinates: 36°51′45″N 10°11′44″E
- Country: Tunisia
- Governorate: Ariana Governorate
- Delegation: Ariana Ville (Ariana Medina)

Government
  - Type: Municipality (administered by state-appointed Secretary-General)

Population (2024)
  - Total: 109,693
- Time zone: UTC+1 (CET)
- Postal code: 2080
- Area code: (+216) 71
- Website: www.commune-ariana.gov.tn?lang=fr

Ariana (Arabic: أريانة Ariana) is a city in north-eastern Tunisia, forming part of the Grand Tunis metropolitan area. Located north of downtown Tunis, it serves as the capital of Ariana Governorate. According to the 2024 Tunisian census, the municipality has a population of 109,693.

== History ==
The name of Ariana is traditionally linked to the Vandals, who settled in North Africa in the 5th century, and to Arianism, the Christian doctrine they followed. The settlement itself dates back to the Zirid dynasty in the 10th century.

During the Hafsid dynasty in the 13th century, Ariana became a favored residential retreat for Tunis nobility and scholars. Ariana was formally established as a municipality on 1 July 1908 during the French protectorate of Tunisia. After Tunisian independence in 1956, rapid urban expansion transformed Ariana from a rural market town into a major residential suburb of Tunis.

== Demographics ==
At the 2024 census, Ariana had a population of 109,693, down about 4% from 114,486 at the 2014 census. About 17% of residents were aged 65 or over in 2024. Tunisian press commentary has linked the decline in Ariana, Ennasr and El Menzah to young residents leaving and an ageing population.

== Economy ==
Before it became a municipality in 1908, Ariana was a small agricultural village. Rose water and essential oils, mostly distilled by Tunisian artisans, are sold at its annual Rose Festival. In the Ennasr district, Avenue Hédi Nouira is described by the local residents' association as the main commercial and residential artery of Ariana. The El Gazala Technopark, a public technology park, lies in nearby Raoued.

== Culture and landmarks ==
Ariana is known as the "City of Roses" (Ville des roses) for its rose-growing tradition. The "Rose of Ariana", once a symbolic ornamental plant of the city, has been studied genetically and linked to Rosa × centifolia, although the authors leave open whether it is that species or a hybrid. An annual Rose Festival (Fête de la Rose) is held in mid-May at Bir Belhassen Park.

Notable landmarks in the city include:

- Bir Belhassen Park (Parc Bir Belhassen): a park with a botanical rose garden where the annual Rose Festival takes place; a 2015 news report said no roses were being grown there.
- Château Ben Ayed: a historic residence that houses the municipality's headquarters.
- Borj Baccouche: a late 19th-century palace listed as a historic monument. It formerly housed the National Centre of Dance and, as of 2026, awaits restoration.

== Geography ==
Ariana lies in the northern suburbs of Tunis, within the Grand Tunis urban area. North of Tunis lies Sebkha Ariana, a seasonal salt lagoon that loses much of its water in summer and is a protected wetland under the Ramsar Convention.

== Climate ==
Ariana has a Mediterranean climate with mild, wet winters and hot, dry summers. Weather observations are recorded at the nearby Tunis–Carthage International Airport meteorological station.

Climate data for Tunis–Carthage International Airport (1991–2020 normals)
Month	Jan	Feb	Mar	Apr	May	Jun	Jul	Aug	Sep	Oct	Nov	Dec	Year
Mean daily maximum °C (°F)	16.4 (61.5)	16.8 (62.2)	19.4 (66.9)	22.3 (72.1)	26.5 (79.7)	31.0 (87.8)	34.0 (93.2)	34.5 (94.1)	30.5 (86.9)	26.7 (80.1)	21.5 (70.7)	17.6 (63.7)	24.8 (76.6)
Mean daily minimum °C (°F)	8.2 (46.8)	8.1 (46.6)	9.8 (49.6)	12.1 (53.8)	15.4 (59.7)	19.3 (66.7)	22.1 (71.8)	22.9 (73.2)	20.7 (69.3)	17.3 (63.1)	12.8 (55.0)	9.4 (48.9)	14.8 (58.6)
Average precipitation mm (inches)	58.9 (2.32)	54.9 (2.16)	45.8 (1.80)	37.9 (1.49)	22.4 (0.88)	12.8 (0.50)	4.4 (0.17)	14.5 (0.57)	58.2 (2.29)	54.7 (2.15)	53.1 (2.09)	68.1 (2.68)	485.6 (19.12)
Source: World Meteorological Organization / NOAA (Tunis–Carthage station)

== Administration and neighbourhoods ==
The municipality of Ariana corresponds to the delegation of Ariana Ville and is divided into four arrondissements:

- Ariana Ville (also called Ariana Médina), which includes the historic medina
- Ariana Supérieure
- Ennasr (Ennasr 1 and 2)
- El Menzah (El Menzah V to VIII)

Under Decree-Law No. 2023-9 of 8 March 2023, all municipal councils in Tunisia were dissolved until new councils are elected, and the running of each commune's day-to-day affairs was entrusted to its secretary general under the supervision of the regional governor. Municipalities were still being run under this arrangement in 2026, with secretary generals appointed by the Interior Ministry.

== Education and healthcare ==
The Higher School of Communications of Tunis (Sup'Com), an engineering school of the University of Carthage, is located at the Cité Technologique des Communications in Ariana.

Public healthcare includes Abderrahmen Mami Hospital in Ariana, which in 2025 added new equipment and new specialists, including two pneumologists. In October 2026 it signed a cooperation agreement with the Institut Curie covering research, training and prevention programmes. Health authorities have discussed upgrading the Mahmoud El Matri regional hospital in Ariana to university-hospital status.

== Transport ==
Ariana is connected to central Tunis by Line 2 of the Tunis Light Metro (Métro léger), which opened in September 1989. The metro and the Tunis bus network are run by the public operator Transtu.

By road, Ariana lies on National Route 8 (RN8), the road linking Tunis to Bizerte, and near the X20 ring road, whose X20–X2 interchange at Ennasr opened in 2018. Tunis–Carthage International Airport lies a few kilometres to the south-east.

== Notable people ==
- Sidi Mahrez (died 1022), saint regarded as the protector of Tunis, born in Ariana

== Twin towns and sister cities ==
Ariana is twinned with:

- Gaziantep, Turkey (since 2013)
