= Lycée pilote =

Type of Tunisian secondary school

The lycée pilote (pilot high school or pioneer high school) is a type of secondary education institution in Tunisia, with 23 structures in 2017. Students are admitted according to a variable quota, after having passed the diploma exam at the end of basic education. It is an elite track intended to pursue advanced studies in the scientific and literary fields.

== Operation ==
The organization and recruitment of students goes through three stages. Pilot high schools first receive students who have passed the entrance exam for the first year of secondary education. As part of the reform of the education system in Tunisia, by which the entrance exam to the first year was abolished and pending the establishment of the basic education diploma, from the 1995–1996 school year and for three years, a competition was organized for third-year secondary students to recruit them into the fourth year.

Students follow a common curriculum in the first year and then specialize in the second year. In addition to traditional programs, the teaching emphasizes computer science, physical sciences, and English for all students starting from the first year. A literature section was added to the options offered to students in five schools from the start of the 2016 academic year.

Promotion to the next class depends on obtaining a general average higher than 12 out of 20; failing that, the student must transfer to another public school. From 1995 onward, promotion also required an arithmetic average of core subjects greater than or equal to 12 out of 20 and a general average greater than or equal to 13 out of 20.

Students at these schools wear a uniform—blue for boys and striped for girls—and benefit from smaller classes than other schools.

== Schools ==
=== Ariana ===
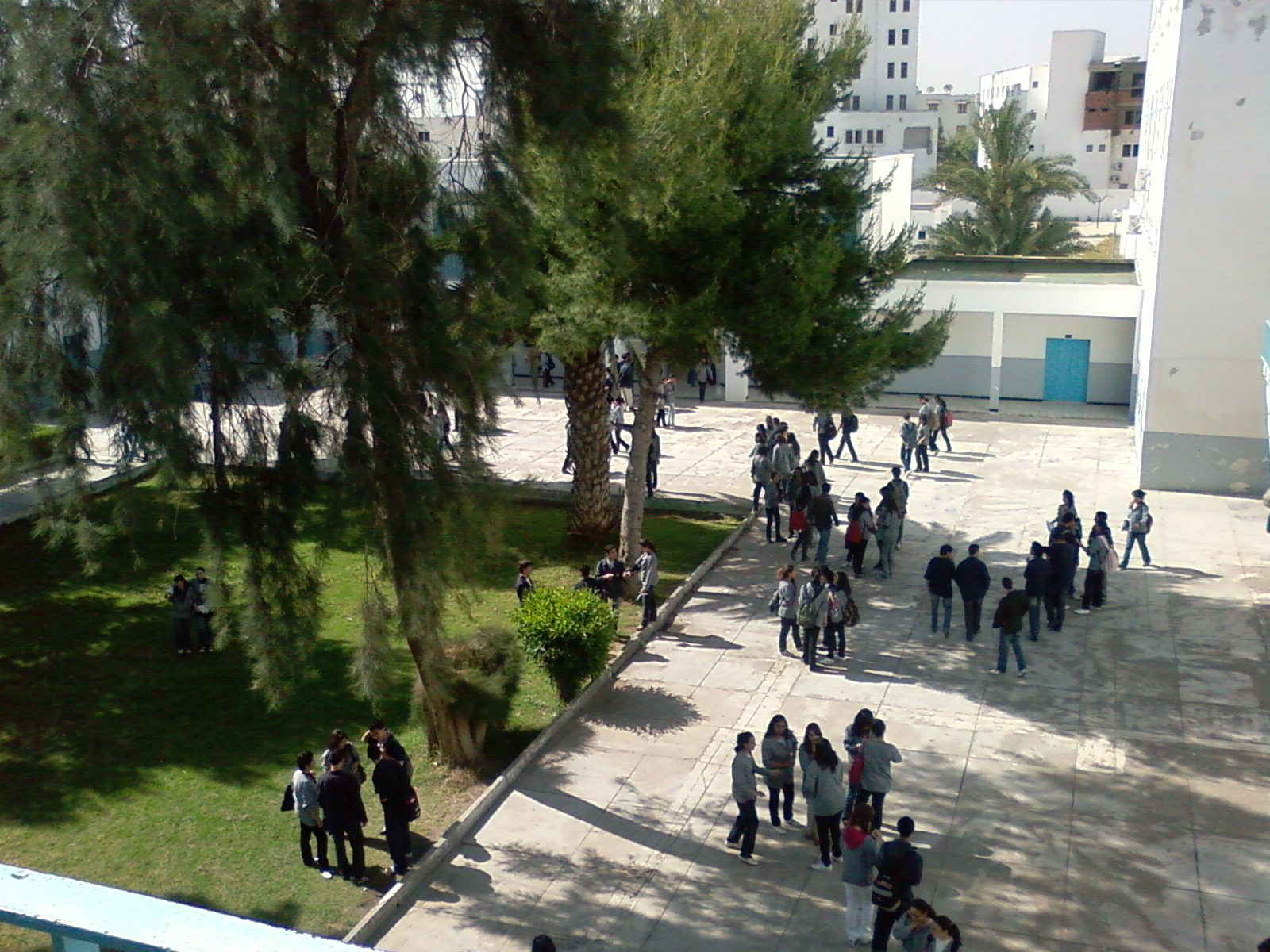
Courtyard of the Ariana pilot high school.

The Ariana pilot high school is located on Avenue de l'Indépendance in Ariana, one of the main cities of the Tunis metropolitan area. Adjacent to the International School of Tunis, with which it shares part of its facilities, it is reputed for the quality of its teaching: the success rate in the national baccalauréat exam reached 100% in 2007.

The school was founded on 15 September 1983. At its beginnings, teaching was delivered in English, but this orientation changed quickly, and French was chosen as the main language for scientific subjects, as in other Tunisian high schools. The school then admitted students as young as twelve and covered seven levels, from the first year of secondary to the final year. On 7 June 2014, it was named after Mohamed Fraj Chedly.

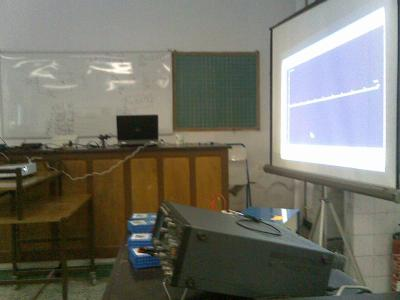
Physics laboratory.

The scientific track includes mathematics, experimental sciences, and technological sciences. The technological section, initially very popular when the school was founded, gradually lost students before disappearing, then reappearing in 2017. In 2011, the school offered five optional subjects: Spanish, German, Italian, Chinese, and music.

The school is known for its strong results in national exams, notably due to the high level of competition among students.

=== Hammam Lif ===
The pilot high school of Hammam Lif was inaugurated on 15 September 2016.

=== Kairouan ===
Students of the pilot high school of Kairouan protested on 27 February 2016 to demand better conditions in the boarding school.

=== Le Kef ===
Students of the pilot high school of Kef protested on 23 September 2016 to denounce the condition of their school.

=== Menzah VIII ===
The Bayram V pilot high school in El Menzah VIII is located on Avenue du Golfe arabe, in the Ariana Governorate.

In 2016, it recorded the highest success rate in the region for the main baccalauréat session, with 99.28%, compared to 42.03% at the regional level and 33.12% nationally.

=== Sfax 2 ===
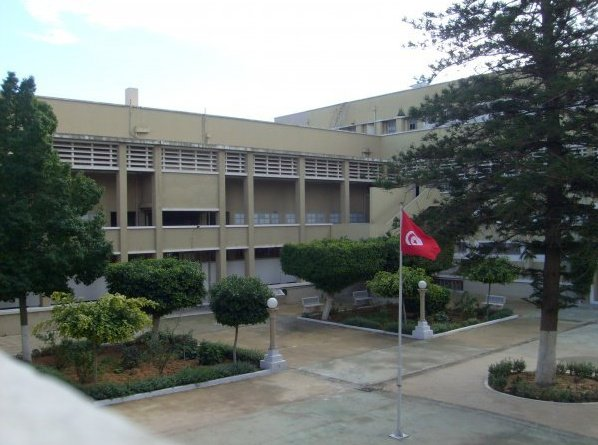
Courtyard of the pilot high school of Sfax.

=== Sousse ===
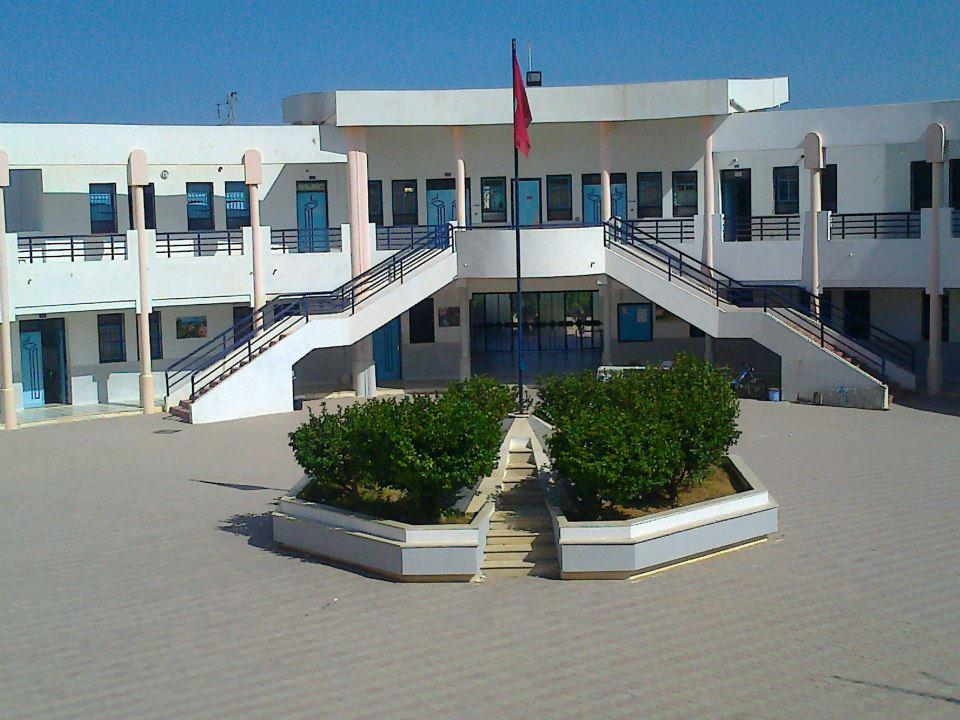
Courtyard of the pilot high school of Sousse.

The pilot high school of Sousse, founded on 15, includes a majority of students coming from schools located in the Sousse Governorate. Housed in the former boarding school of the boys' high school of Sousse for fourteen years, it moved into its new premises in September 2003.

The school is known for its strong results in national exams, with Tunisian laureates of the baccalauréat almost always including at least one student from the pilot high school of Sousse. It remains the first in its governorate thanks to its success rate (100%) in 2007, 2012, or 2015.

Students created an art committee on 1 March 2011, following the revolution, to gather and develop their talents. In addition, each year, the graduating students organize an event on the day of their sports exam to celebrate their success and relax before the national exams.

There is an alumni association of the pilot high school, created on 3 April 2010, which almost every year organizes welcome ceremonies for new members; its headquarters is located at the school. During the 2012–2013 school year, the parents’ association of the pilot high school of Sousse was created.

=== Tunis ===
It is named Bourguiba pilot high school.
