= Khalidia =

Coordinates: 36°38′24″N 10°11′24″E

Khalidia خليدية
- Commune and town
- Interactive map of Khalidia
- Country: Tunisia
- Governorate: Ben Arous Governorate

Government
  - Mayor: Monia Ajaâl (Ennahdha)

Population (2014)
  - Total: 8,470
- Time zone: UTC+1 (CET)

Khalidia is a town and commune in the Ben Arous Governorate, Tunisia.

== See also ==
- List of cities in Tunisia
