= Mnihla =

Municipality in Ariana Governorate, Tunisia

Mnihla المنيهلة
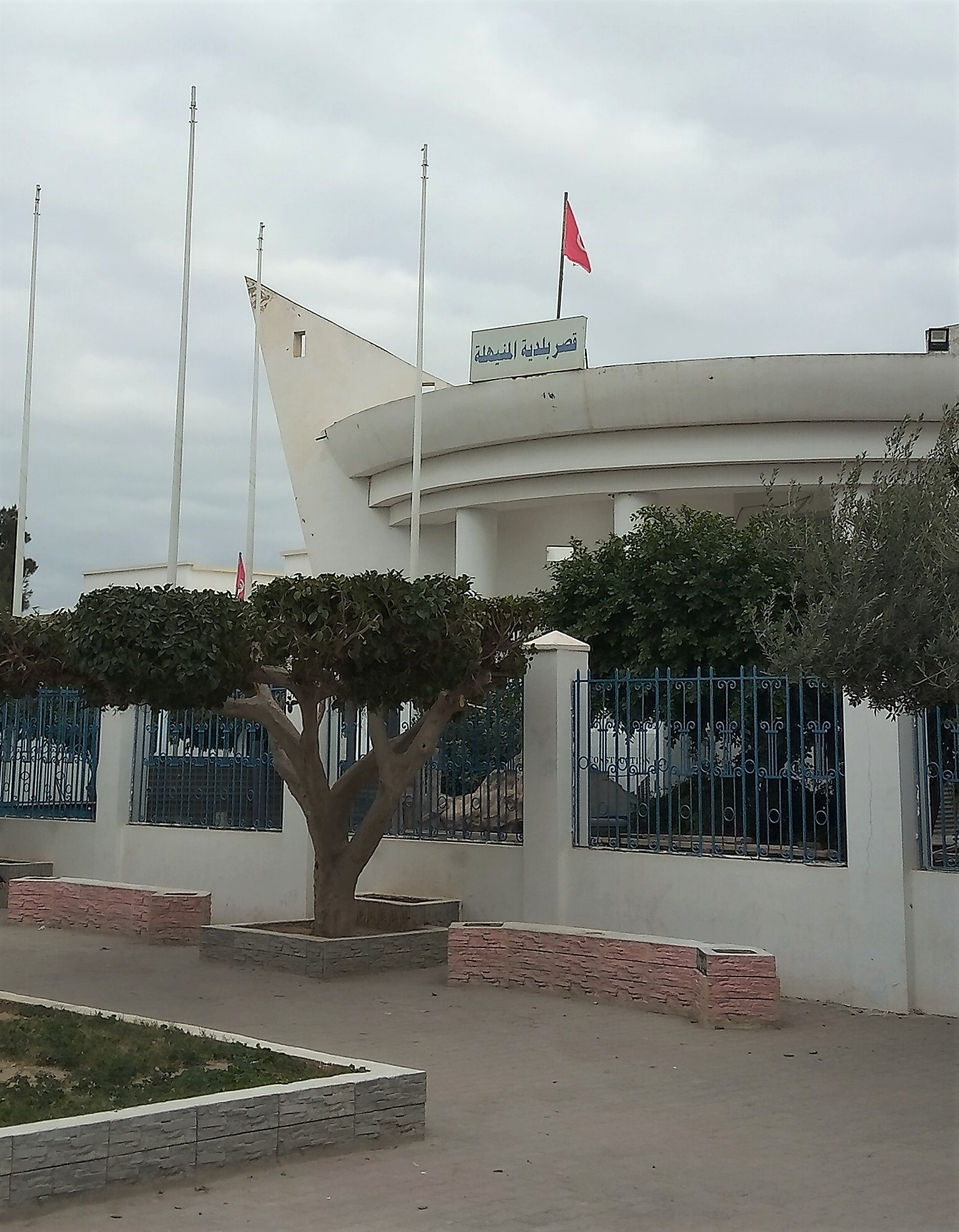
- Seat of the municipality of Mnihla

- Location within Tunisia
- Country: Tunisia
- Governorate: Ariana Governorate
- Time zone: UTC+1 (CET)

Mnihla is a municipality and commune in the Ariana Governorate, part of the Greater Tunis metropolitan area.

== History ==
It is a working-class neighborhood that was created in the 1970s with the arrival of populations from internal migration. Originally an area mostly built with no official permits, it was later integrated into the urban master plan of the Tunis metropolitan area.

It was established on May 26, 2016, following a split from the municipality of Ettadhamen-Mnihla.

The municipality is divided into two parts: the main area of Mnihla, which consists of the neighborhoods of El Basatin, Al Saffa, and Aishish, and Upper Mnihla, located at a higher elevation, which includes the neighborhoods of Al-Kilani, Al-Kaabi, and Al-Saffa.

== See also ==
- Ettadhamen
- Ariana Governorate
