= Mohamedia-Fouchana =

- Municipality
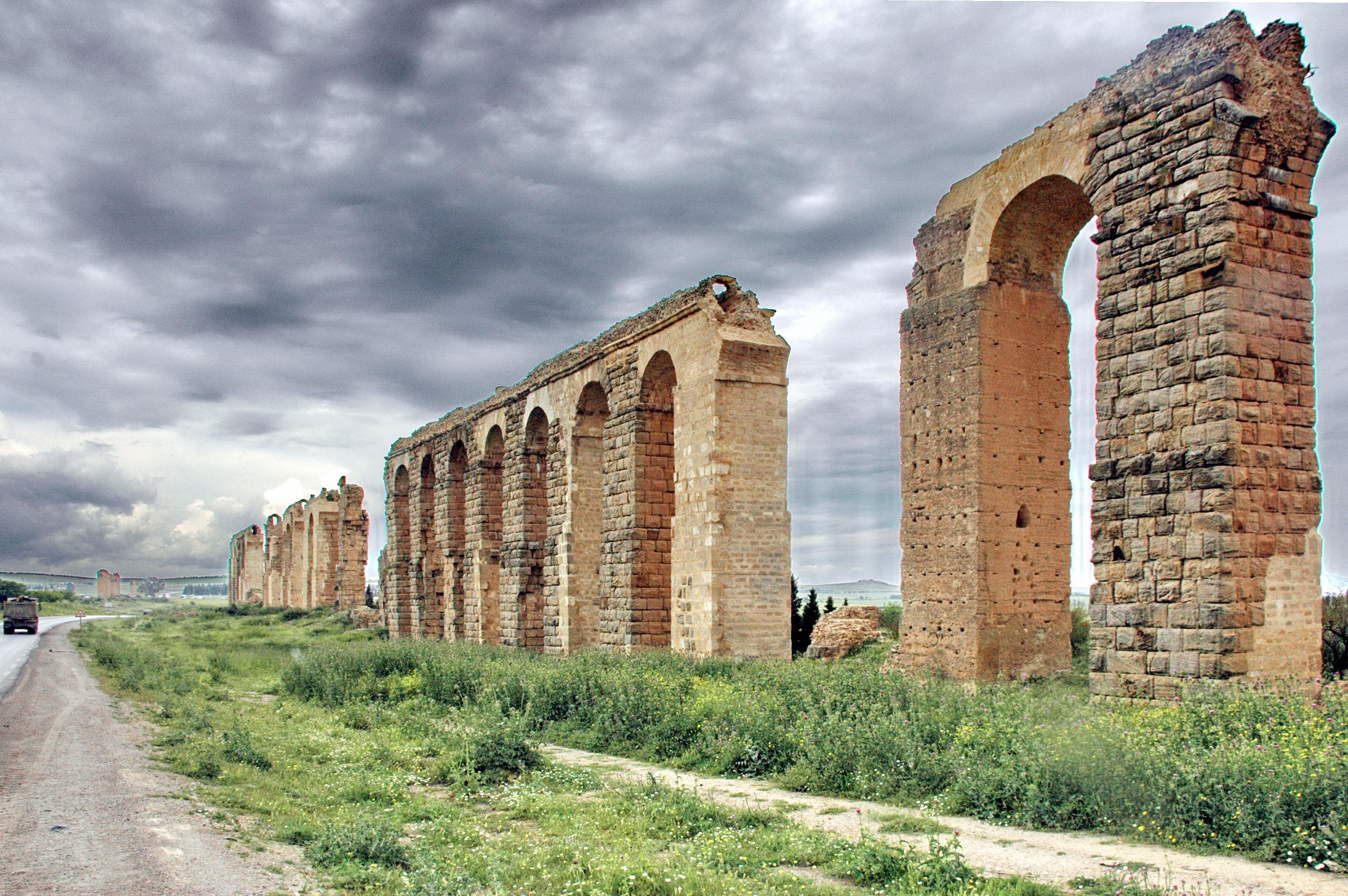
- A Roman aqueduct to the south of Mohamedia
- Country: Tunisia
- Governorate: Ben Arous Governorate

Population (2022)
  - Total: 129,300
- Time zone: UTC+1 (CET)

Mohamedia-Fouchana is a municipality in the Ben Arous Governorate, Tunisia. It consists of the towns of Mohamedia and Fouchana which are however the seats of distinct governoral delegations.

== See also ==
- List of cities in Tunisia
