= Cissita =

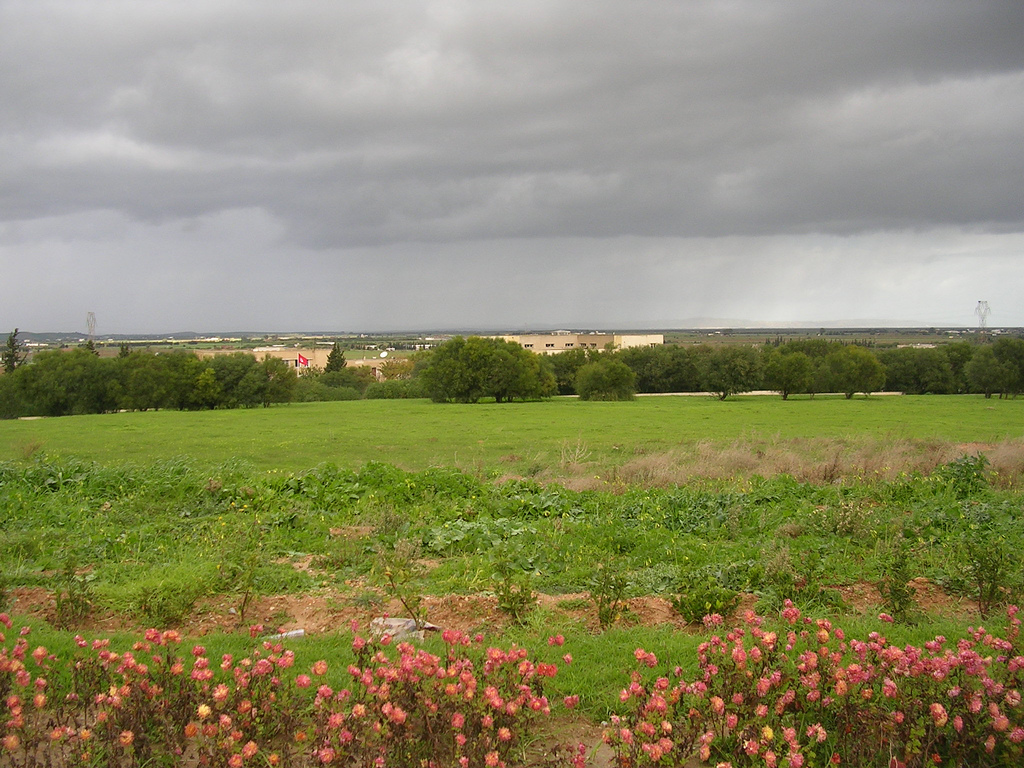
Area around Sidi Thabet (Cissita?)

Cissita was a town and bishopric of Roman North Africa, which only remains as a Catholic titular see.

== History ==
Cissita was located about 36°54'04"N 10°2' 9.96"W and has been tentatively identified with ruins near Sidi T(h)abet, 24 kilometers from Tunis.

The town was among the many civitates (cities) of the Roman province of Africa Proconsularis of sufficient importance to become a suffragan diocese of the metropolitan of Carthage, in the papal sway, but like most faded completely, probably at the 7th-century advent of Islam.

Two of its bishops are historically documented (one disputed):

- Quodvultdeus was among the Donatist bishops present at the Council of Carthage (411), where his schismatic heresy was condemned as such.
- Crescens was among the Catholic prelates at the Council of Carthage in 484 by king Huneric of the Vandal Kingdom, and was exiled following the conference like most Catholic bishops.

== Titular see ==
The diocese of Cissita was nominally restored in 1933 as the Latin titular bishopric of Cissita (Latin = Curiate Italian) / Cissitan(us) (Latin adjective)

It has had the following incumbents, of the fitting Episcopal (lowest) rank:

- Heinrich Gleumes (1948.10.08 – death 1951.08.26) as Auxiliary Bishop of Diocese of Münster (Germany) (1948.10.08 – 1951.08.26)
- Francis Clement van Hoeck, Subiaco Cassinese Benedictines (O.S.B. Subl.) (1954.01.06 – death 1976.04.20), first as Abbot Ordinary of the Territorial Abbey of Pietersburg (South Africa) (1954.01.06 – 1975), then as emeritate
- Antonio Pagano (1977.08.27 – 1983.12.18)
- Salvatore Di Salvo (1984.04.09 – 2005.12.05)
- Octavio Villegas Aguilar (2005.12.29 – ...), first as Auxiliary Bishop of Archdiocese of Morelia (Mexico) (2005.12.29 – 2015.04.08), then on emeritate (2015.04.08 - ...).

== See also ==
- List of Catholic dioceses in Tunisia
- Cissi, ancient city and former bishopric in Roman Mauretania, which had been confused with Cissita

== Sources and external links ==
- GCatholic - (former &) titular bishopric

Bibliography - ecclesiastical history

- Pius Bonifacius Gams, Series episcoporum Ecclesiae Catholicae, Leipzig 1931, p. 465
- Stefano Antonio Morcelli, Africa christiana, Volume I, Brescia 1816, p. 139
- J. Ferron, lemma 'Cicsi' in Dictionnaire d'Histoire et de Géographie ecclésiastiques, vol. XII, Paris 1953, coll. 827-828
