= Ettadhamen-Mnihla =

Former municipality in Ariana Governorate, Tunisia

Ettadhamen-Mnihla التضامن
- Commune and town
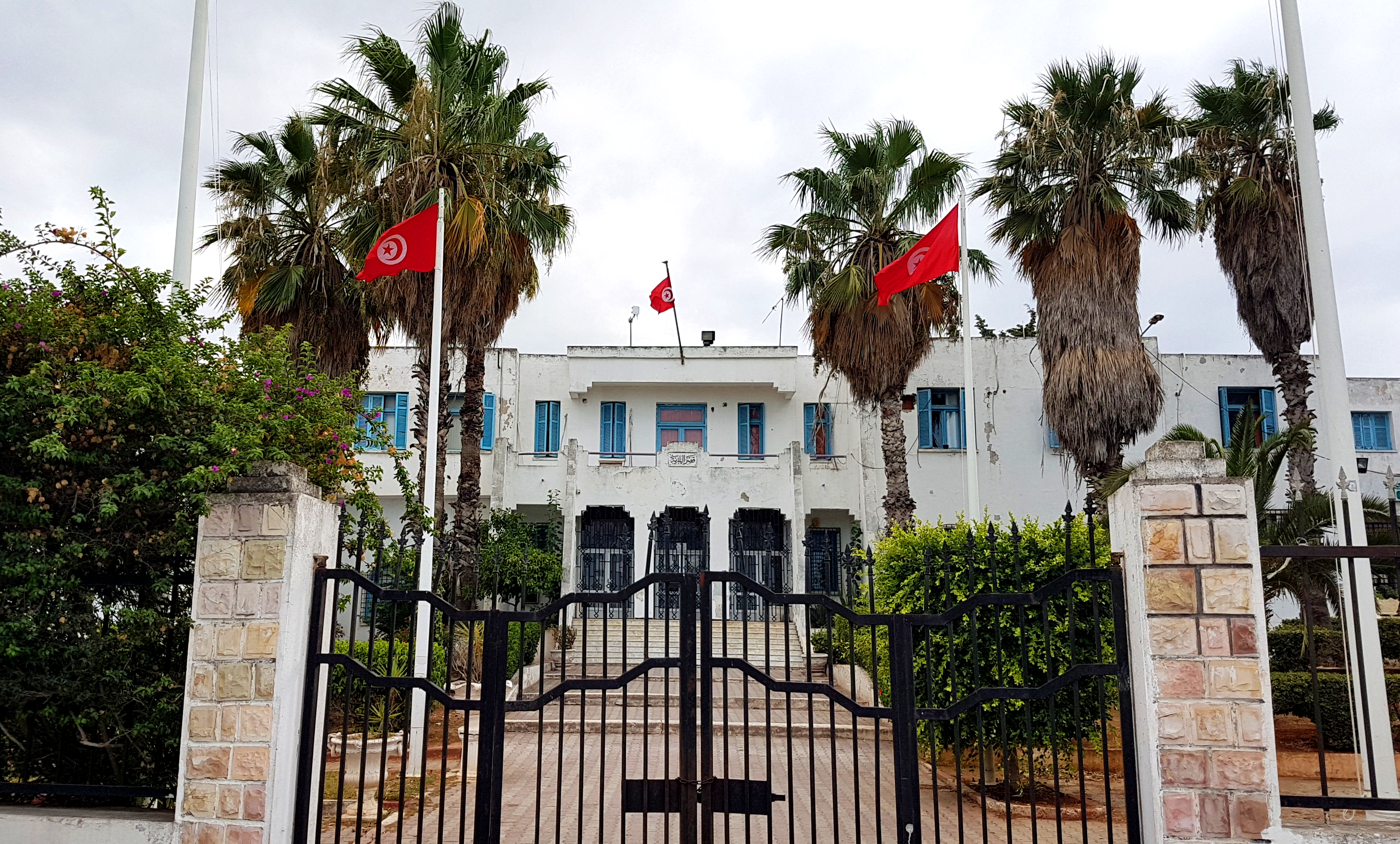

- Location within Tunisia
- Coordinates: 36°50′09″N 10°06′25″E
- Country: Tunisia
- Governorate: Ariana Governorate

Area
  - Total: 24 km^{2} (9.3 sq mi)

Population (2022)
  - Total: 203,304
  - Density: 8,500/km^{2} (22,000/sq mi)
- Time zone: UTC+1 (CET)
- Postal code: 2041

Ettadhamen-Mnihla is a former municipality of the governorate of Ariana attached to the agglomeration of Tunis before being divided in 2016 into two distinct municipalities: Ettadhamen and Mnihla.
