= El Maâgoula =

Coordinates: 36°42′00″N 9°10′55″E

El Maâgoula المعقولة
- Commune and town
- Interactive map of El Maâgoula
- Country: Tunisia
- Governorate: Béja Governorate
- Time zone: UTC+1 (CET)

El Maâgoula is a town and commune in the Béja Governorate, Tunisia. As of 2004 it had a total population of 7690.

== Population ==
2014 Census (Municipal)
Homes	Families	Males	Females	Total
2161	2098	4170	4222	8392

== See also ==
- List of cities in Tunisia
