= Kalâat el-Andalous =

Coordinates: 37°03′45″N 10°07′06″E

Kalâat el-Andalous قلعة الأندلس
- Commune and town
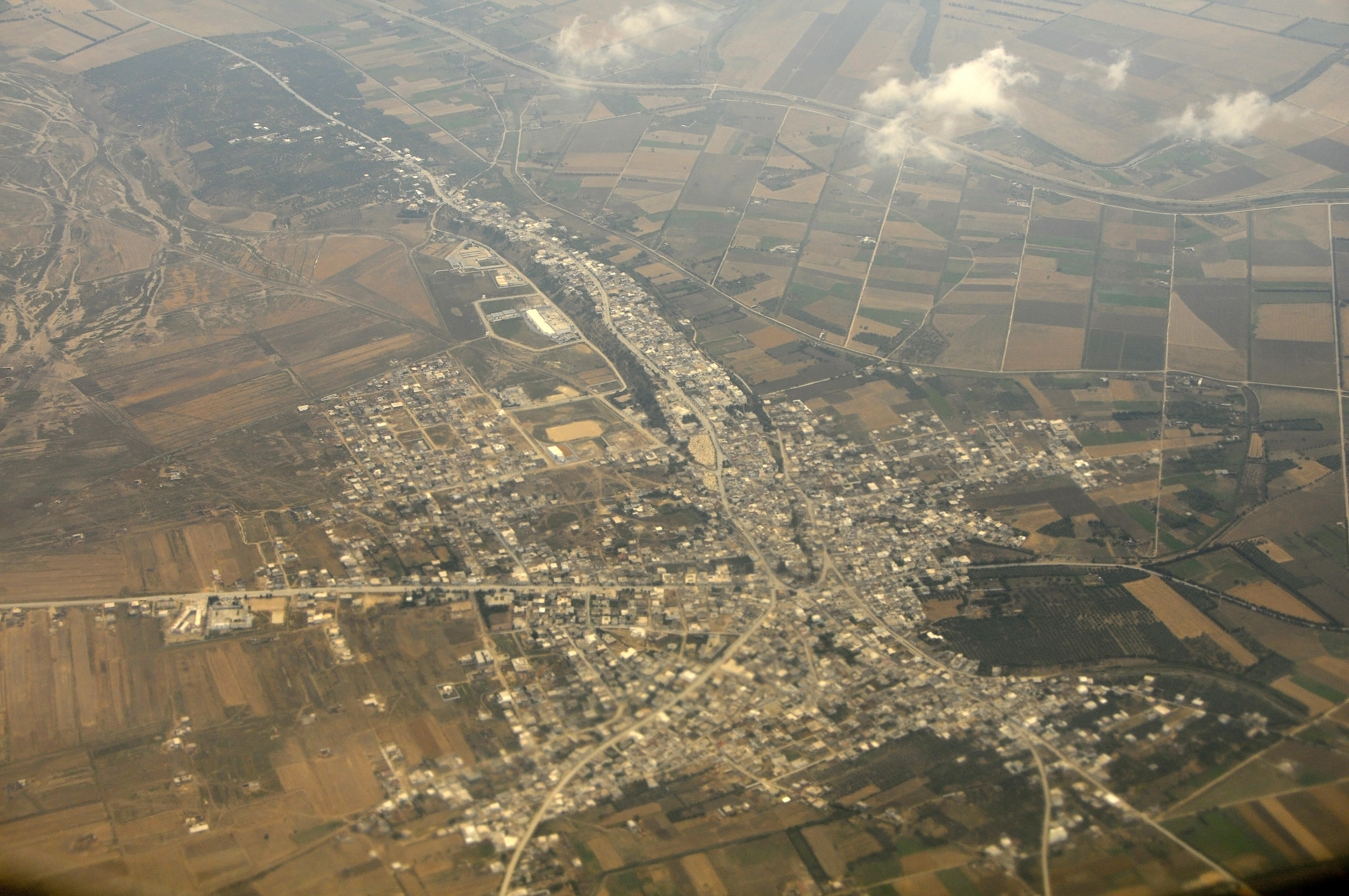
- Interactive map of Kalâat el-Andalous
- Country: Tunisia
- Governorate: Ariana Governorate

Population (2014)
  - Total: 18,225
- Time zone: UTC+1 (CET)

Kalâat el-Andalous is a town and commune in the Ariana Governorate, Tunisia. It is located 30 miles north of Tunis. As of 2004 it had a total population of 15,313.

Kalâat el-Andalous means "citadel of the Andalusis/Andalusians"; this refers to the seventeenth century when Muslims who had been driven out of al-Andalus settled in the fertile Medjerda River valley.

The dominant activity in the region is agriculture, which benefits from its proximity to the Medjerda River, the longest in Tunisia.

The city is split with a village coast which hosts a port of fishing. The proximity of the city Tunis constitutes a northern boundary and the beauty of a coastal strip of sand make it one of the future tourist areas of the capital.

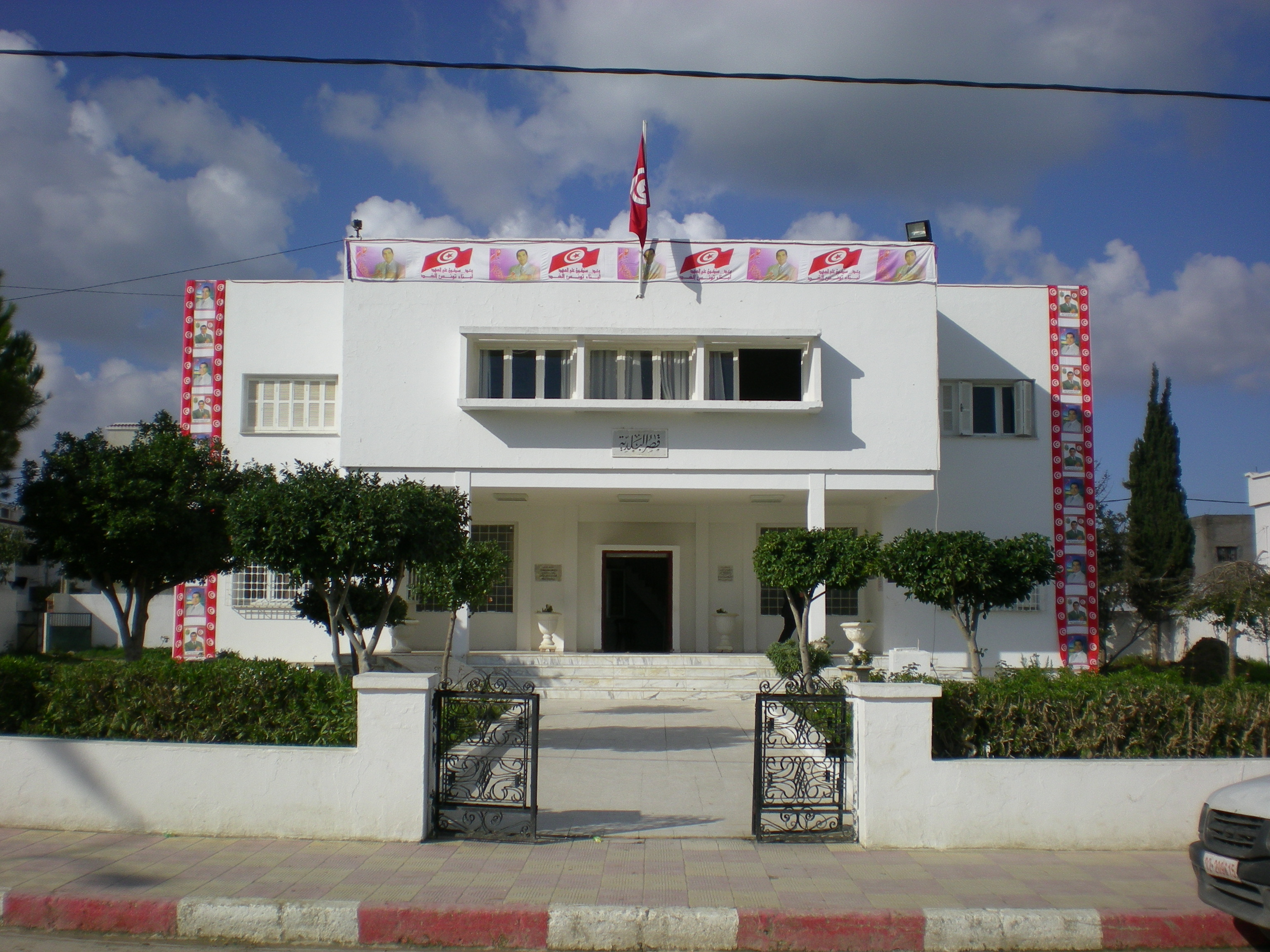
City hall

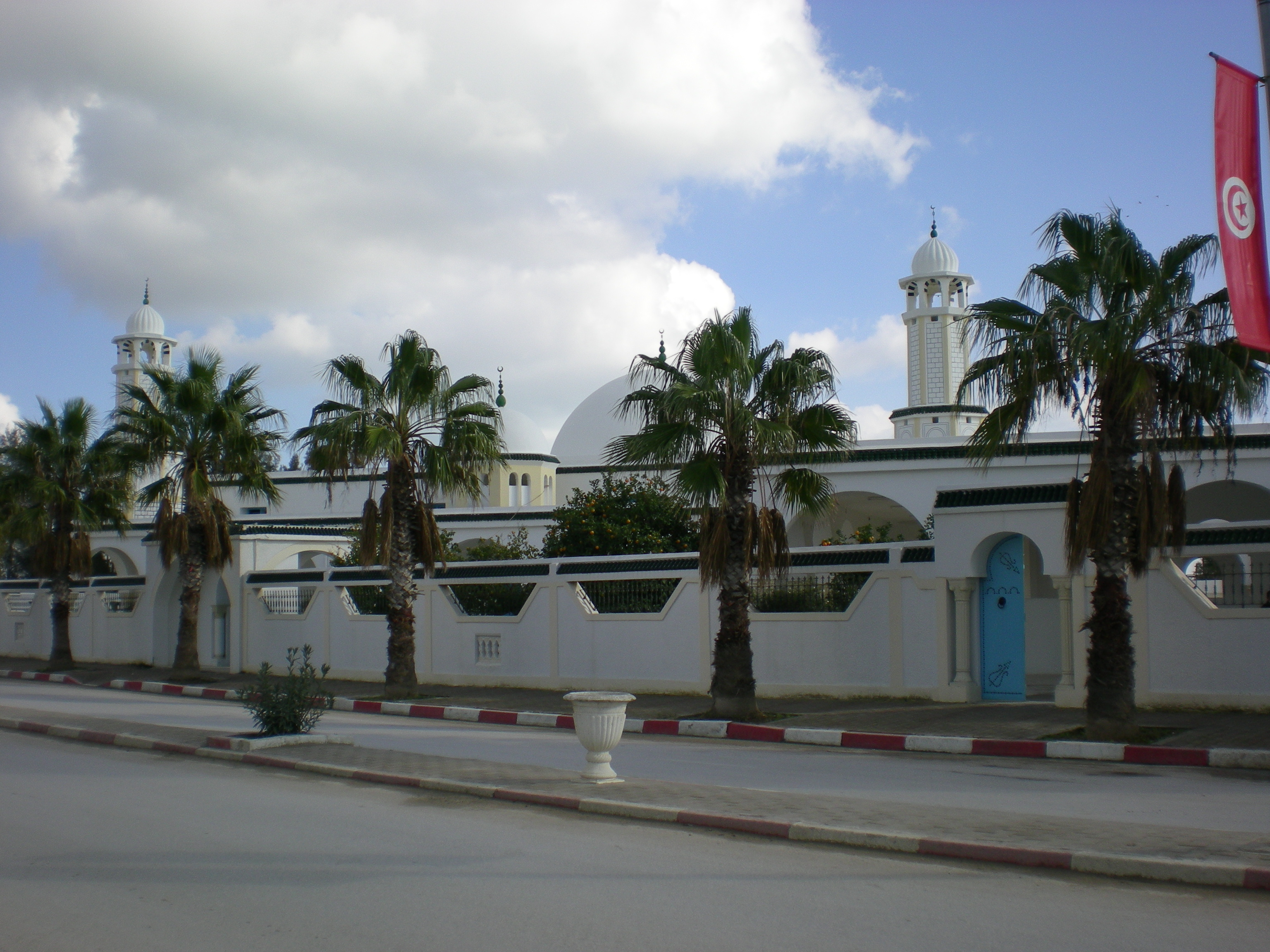
Mosque of Cordoba

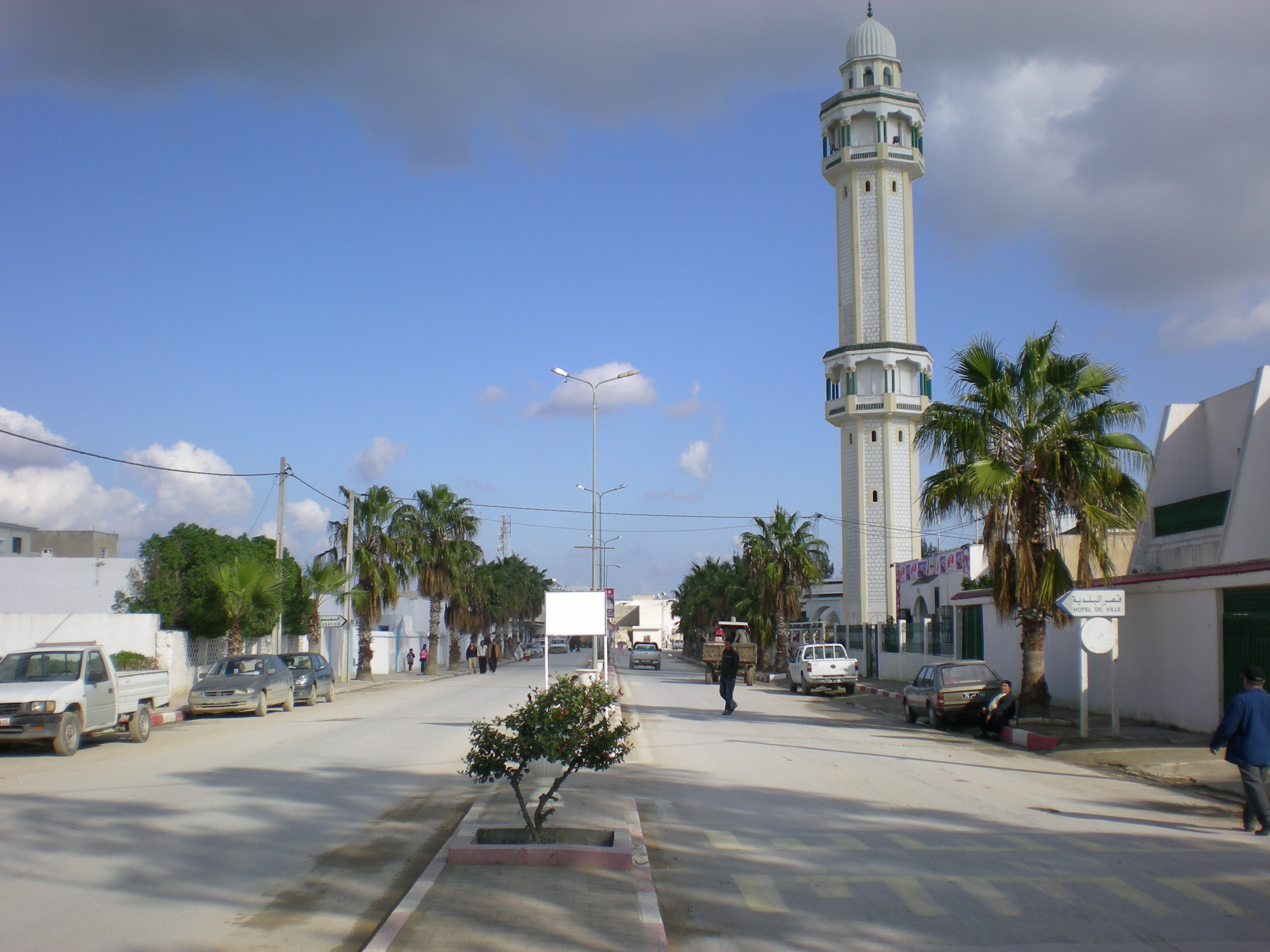
Main street

== See also ==
- List of cities in Tunisia
