= Grand Tunis =

Metropolitan area in Tunisia

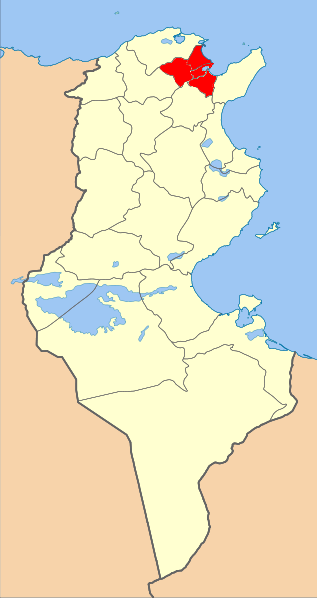
Map of the region.

Grand Tunis or Greater Tunis (Arabic: تونس الكبرى, French: Grand Tunis) is the largest metropolitan area in Tunisia, centered on the country's capital Tunis. It consists of four governorates: Tunis, Ariana, Manouba, and Ben Arous. According to the 2004 population census, the area of Grand Tunis is home to 2,247,800 people. Recent estimates suggest it is home to over 2.8 million people, which makes Tunis by far the largest city in the country and its economical and cultural hub.

== See also ==
- North East Tunisia
