= Goubellat =

Goubellat (also spelled Quballat)
- Commune and town
- Interactive map of Goubellat (also spelled Quballat)
- Coordinates: 36°32′N 9°40′E
- Country: Tunisia
- Governorate: Béja Governorate

Population (2014)
  - Total: 15,762
- Time zone: UTC+1 (CET)
- Postal code: 9080

Goubellat (Arabic: قبلاط) is a town and commune in the Béja Governorate, Tunisia.

Attached to the governorate of Béja, Goubellat is a municipality that had 4,128 inhabitants in 2014, it is also the capital of a delegation with 16,383 inhabitants as of 2004 (of which 12,642 live in rural areas, i.e. 77% of the inhabitants.

== Economy ==
The city seeks to develop its industrial activities by extending the industrial zone to an area of nine hectares. It seeks to capture new investments by promoting the motorway link with Tunis, which is only half an hour away since the inauguration of the A3 motorway in 2005.

== See also ==
- List of cities in Tunisia
- Battle of Touayel

== Population ==
2014 Census (Municipal)
Homes	Families	Males	Females	Total
1092	965	2091	2037	4128
