= Bou Mhel el-Bassatine =

Bou Mhel el-Bassatine بومهل البساتين
- Commune and town
- Location within Tunisia
- Coordinates: 36°44′02″N 10°17′50″E
- Country: Tunisia
- Governorate: Ben Arous Governorate

Area
  - Total: 849 sq mi (2,198 km^{2})

Population (2022)
  - Total: 50,604
- Time zone: UTC+1 (CET)
- Postal code: 2097

Bou Mhel el-Bassatine is a town and commune in the Ben Arous Governorate, Tunisia. As of 2022 it had a total population of 50,604. It lies close to Radès and Ezzahra.

== See also ==
- List of cities in Tunisia
