= Amdoun =

Coordinates: 36°46′05″N 9°05′21″E

Amdoun Zahret Medien
- Commune and town
- Interactive map of Amdoun
- Country: Tunisia
- Governorate: Béja Governorate
- Time zone: UTC+1 (CET)

Amdoun (Arabic: عمدون), also called Zahret Medien is a town and commune in the Béja Governorate, Tunisia. As of 2004, it had a total population of 4,960.

== See also ==
- List of cities in Tunisia
