= Sidi Thabet =

Coordinates: 36.9139°N 10.0361°E

Sidi Thabet سيدي ثابت
- Commune and town
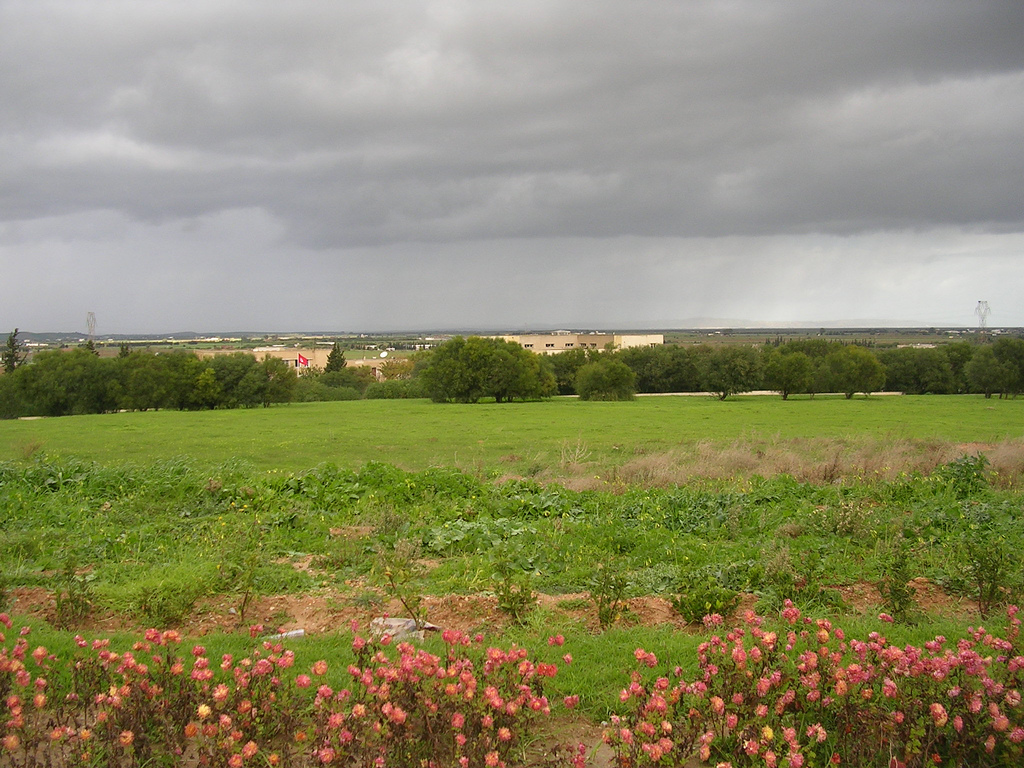
- Interactive map of Sidi Thabet
- Country: Tunisia
- Governorate: Ariana Governorate

Population (2014)
  - Total: 11,385
- Time zone: UTC+1 (CET)

Sidi Thabet is a town and commune (municipality) in the Ariana Governorate, Tunisia.

As of 2004, it had a total population of 8,909.

== History ==
It is suggested as the most plausible site for the Ancient Roman city and former bishopric Cissita, which remains a Latin Catholic titular see.

== Education ==
In 2003, a tech hub specializing in biotechnology and the pharmaceutical industry, BiotechPole Sidi Thabet, was established. It includes a high-tech business incubator, a campus, and research laboratories. In 2006, the campus hosted around one hundred researchers, two higher education institutions (the National School of Veterinary Medicine and the Higher Institute of Biotechnology), as well as several research centers, including the National Center for Nuclear Sciences and Technologies and the National Institute for Physical-Chemical Research and Analysis, while an industrial zone was also established.

== See also ==
- List of cities in Tunisia
