= Nefza =

Coordinates: 37°06′00″N 9°11′24″E

Nefza نفزة
- Commune and town
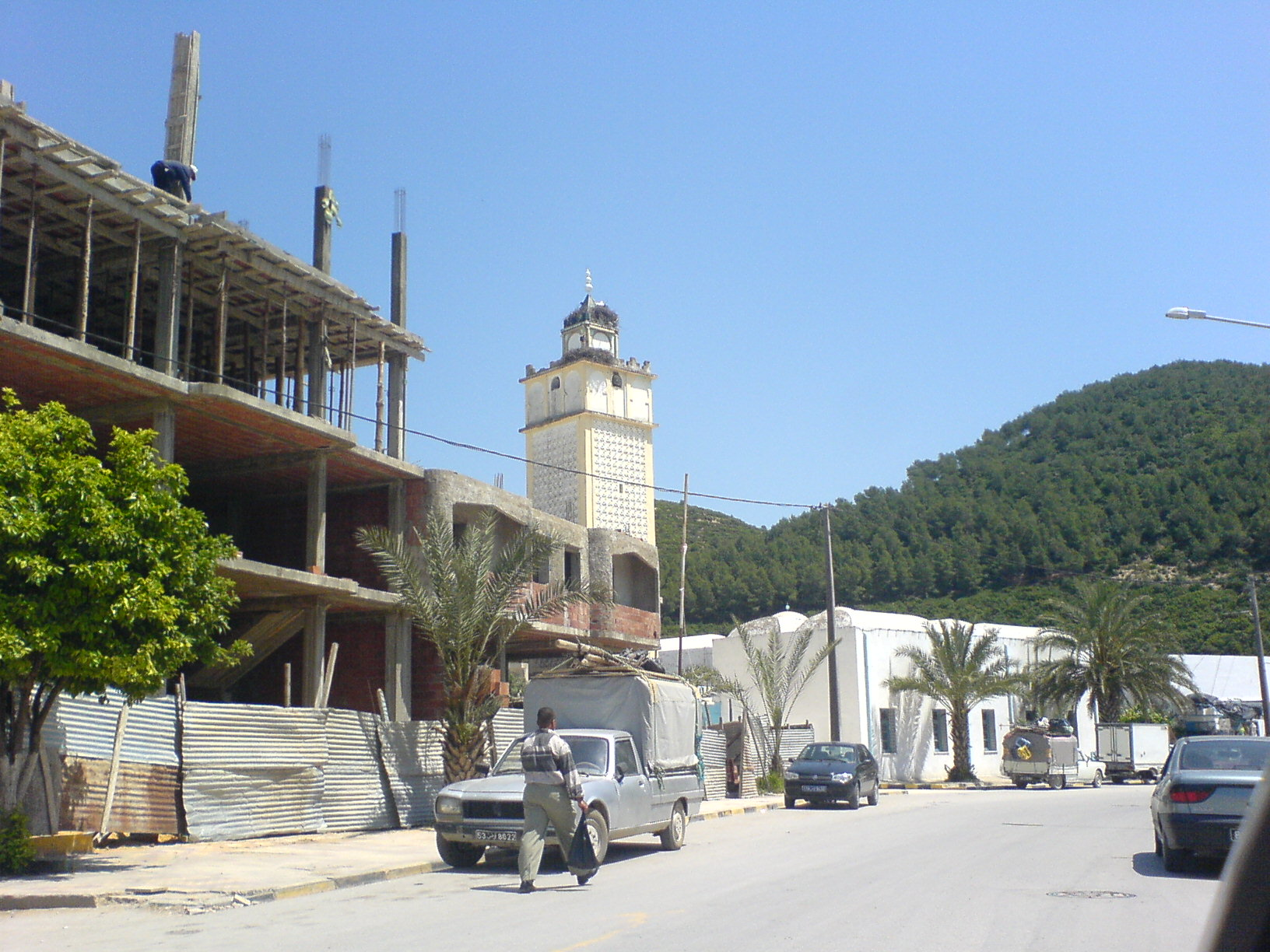
- Interactive map of Nefza
- Country: Tunisia
- Governorate: Béja Governorate

Government
  - Mayor: Maher Fraihi (Independent)

Population (2014)
  - Total: 7,451
- Time zone: UTC+1 (CET)

Nefza is a town and commune in the Béja Governorate, Tunisia. As of 2014 it had a total population of 14,451

== See also ==
- List of cities in Tunisia
