= Fouchana =

Fouchana فوشانة
- Town
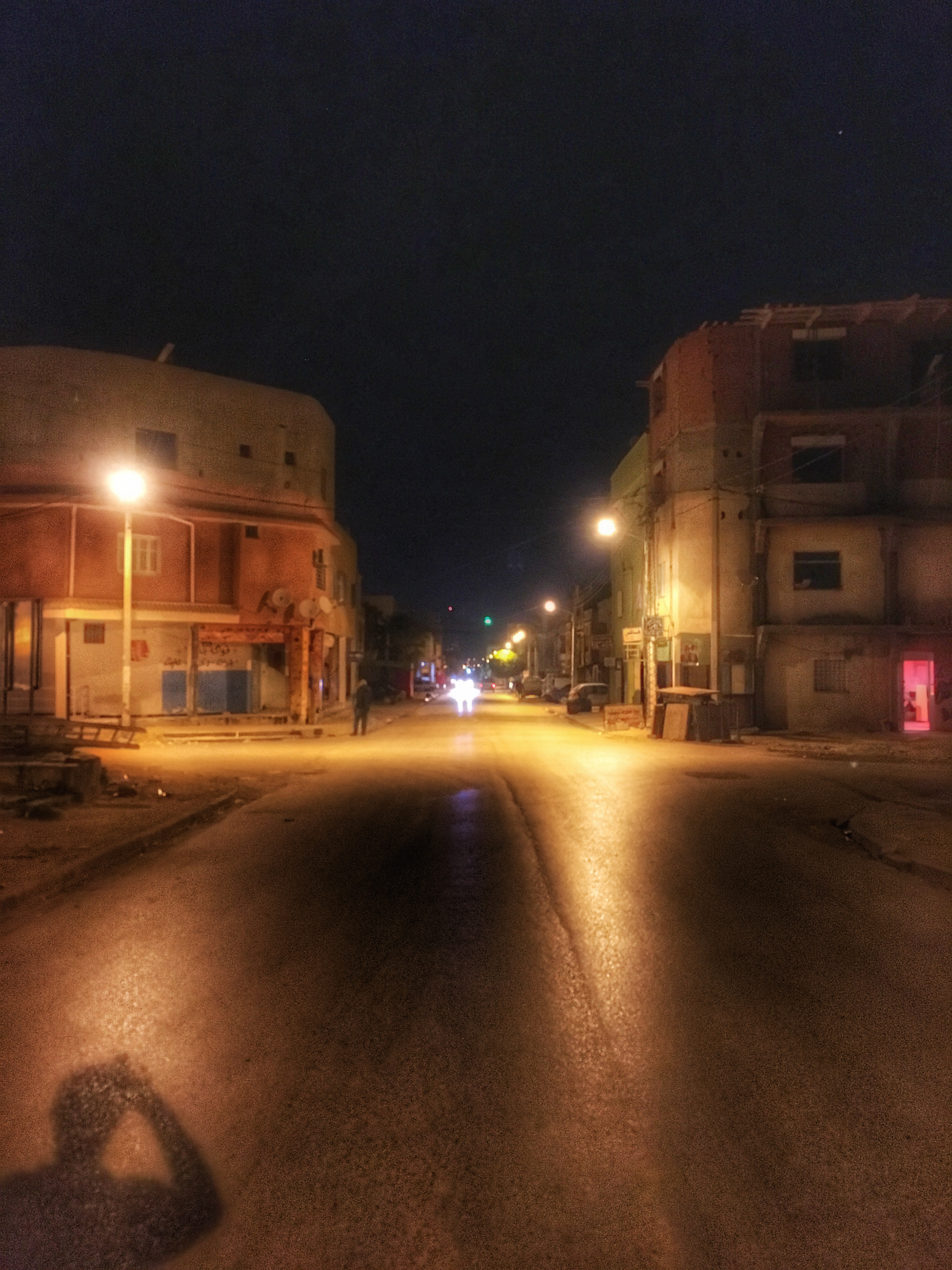
- Interactive map of Fouchana
- Coordinates: 36°42′N 10°10′E
- Country: Tunisia
- Governorate: Ben Arous Governorate
- Delegation(s): Fouchana
- Time zone: UTC+1 (CET)
- Postal code: 2082

Fouchana is a town in Ben Arous Governorate, Tunisia. Governed by the joint municipality of Mohamedia-Fouchana, it is also the seat of an eponymous governoral delegation.

Fouchana (فوشانة) is located at 36°42′09.31″N, 10°09′25.9″E about ten kilometers south of the capital, Tunis. Associated with Mohamedia, it forms a municipality with 106 167 inhabitants in 2014.

== Economy ==
It is an important industrial center comprising three industrial zones (M'ghira 1, 2 and 3). At the level of the delegation of which it is the administrative center, industrial employment accounts for half of total employment. According to the development project of the Greater Tunis, the city will benefit from a fast railway line by the line Tunis-Fouchana (line C).
