= Raoued =

Raoued رواد
- Commune and town
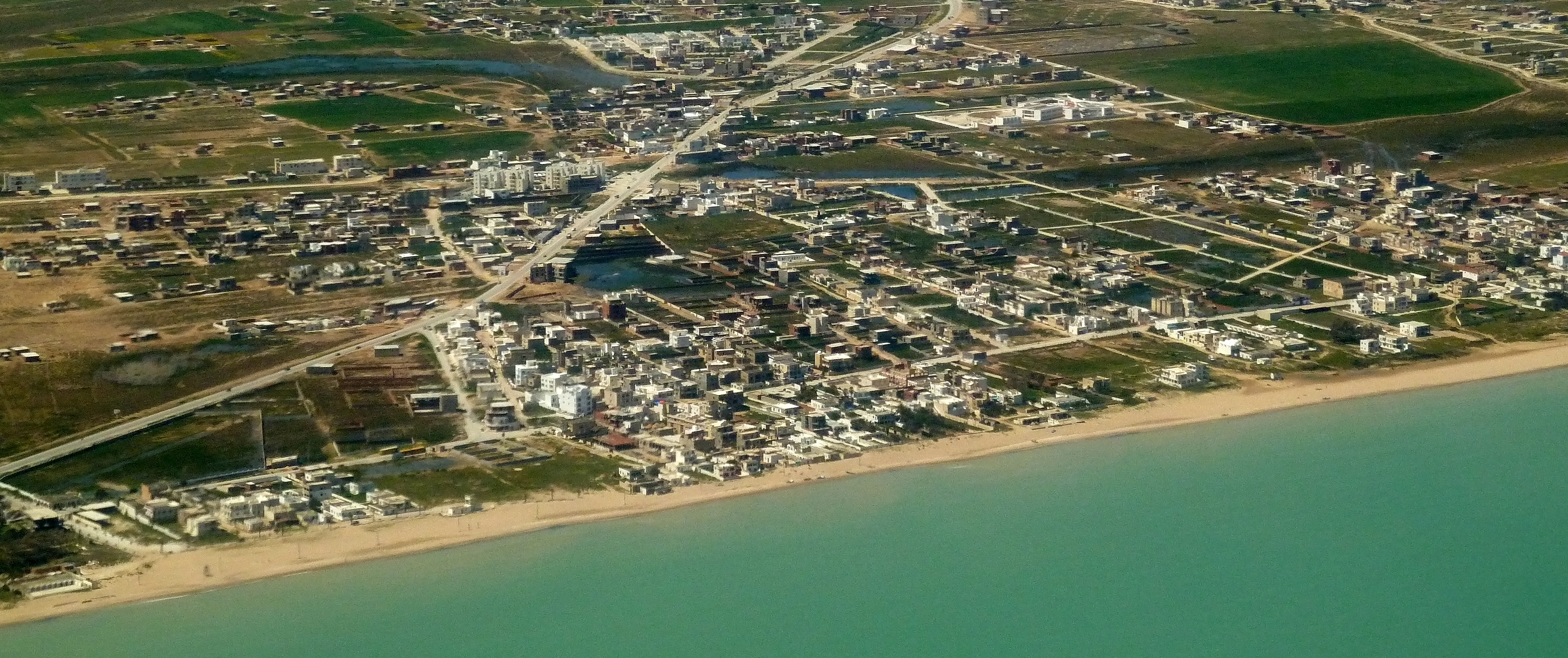
- Aerial view of Raoeud

- Location within Tunisia
- Coordinates: 36°57′16″N 10°11′29″E
- Country: Tunisia
- Governorate: Ariana Governorate

Population (2022)
  - Total: 138,986
- Time zone: UTC+1 (CET)

Raoued (Tunisian Arabic: رواد rawād) is a town and commune in the Ariana Governorate, Tunisia. As of 2014 it had a total population of 138,986.

Giant sandstorms wiped across most of the city in 2016.

== See also ==
- List of cities in Tunisia
