= Béja Governorate =

Governorate of Tunisia

Béja باجة
- Governorate
- Map of Tunisia with Béja highlighted

- Subdivisions of Béja Governorate
- Coordinates: 36°44′N 9°11′E
- Country: Tunisia
- Created: June 1956
- Capital: Béja

Government
  - Governor: Ahmed Ben Kharrat (since 2024)

Area
  - Total: 3,740 km^{2} (1,440 sq mi)
  - Rank: Ranked 14th of 24

Population (2014)
  - Total: 303,032
  - Rank: Ranked 18th of 24
  - Density: 81.0/km^{2} (210/sq mi)
- Time zone: UTC+01 (CET)
- Postal prefix: xx
- ISO 3166 code: TN-31

Béja Governorate (Arabic: ولاية باجة Wilāyat Bājah pronounced [ˈbæːʒæ]; French: Gouvernorat de Béja) is one of the twenty-four governorates of Tunisia. It is in northern Tunisia and has a brief coastline relative to its size. It covers an area of 3,740 km^{2} and had a population of 303,032 as of the 2014 census. The capital is Béja and it spans the moderately high Tell Atlas hills and part of the plain between the Tell Atlas and the Dorsal Atlas further south.

== Geography ==
The governorate is 105 kilometres (65 mi) from the capital and surrounded by the governorates of Bizerte, Zaghouan, Manouba, Siliana, and Jendouba.

The average temperature is 18 °C and annual rainfall is 350-1000 millimeters.

== Administrative divisions ==
Administratively, the governorate is divided into nine delegations (mutamadiyat), eight municipalities, eight rural councils, and 101 sectors (imadas). The delegations and their populations from the 2004 and 2014 censuses, are listed below:

Delegation	Population in 2004	Population in 2014
Amdoun	22,484	21,187
Béja Nord	67,471	71,198
Béja Sud	38,396	38,101
Goubellat	16,383	15,762
Medjez El Bab	38,964	41,749
Nefza	53,195	48,101
Teboursouk	24,327	22,115
Testour	32,772	33,613
Tibar	10,509	11,206

The following eight municipalities are located in Béja Governorate:

2111	Béja	86,890
2112	El Maâgoula	16,477
2113	Zahret Medien	21,403
2114	Nefza	25,815
2115	Téboursouk	21,414
2116	Testour	27,453
2117	Goubellat	16,767
2118	Medjez El Bab	44,879
	Ouchtata - Jmila	21,758
	Sidi Ismaïl	9,975
	Slouguia	8,048
	Thibar	10,538

== Governors ==
A historical list of Governors of Beja Governorate since the independence in 1956:

- Béchir Bellagha (1956–1957)
- Ahmed Bellalouna (1957–1959)
- Taher Abdelkefi (1959–1961)
- Mohsen Nouira (1961–1964)
- Mohamed Triki (1964–1966)
- Tahar Kacem (1966-31 December 1968)
- Abderrazak Kéfi (January–September 1969)
- Romdhan Ben Mimoun (1969–1971)
- Mohamed Hédi Bellakhoua (1971–1973)
- Noureddine Fenniche (1973–1977)
- Abderrazak Ladab (1977–1980)
- Hédi Harbi (May–December 1980)
- Lamine El Kadri (1980–1984)
- Chédli Neffati (1984–1987)
- Moncef Ben Jedidia (1987–1990)
- Hédi Ayeche (1990–1993)
- Sadok Marzouk (1993–1998)
- Hassen Alaya (1998–1999)
- Mohamed Belghith (1999–2000)
- Mohsen Senoussi (2000–2001)
- Salem Jeribi (2001–2005)
- Mohamed Ben Salem (2005–2007)
- Kamel Someï (2007–2011)
- Hatem Hamzaoui (2 February 2011)
- Baheddine Bakari (19 February 2011 – 22 February 2012)
- Nasr Temimi (22 February 2012 – 28 February 2014)
- Kamel Salmani (28 February 2014-22 August 2015)
- Atef Boughattas (22 August 2015-7 September 2015)
- Houcine Hamdi (7 September 2015-29 October 2017)
- Slim Tissaoui (29 October 2017-27 December 2019)
- Mohsen Moez Mili (27 December 2019-30 August 2022)
- Ahmed Ben Kharrat (since 8 September 2024)
