= Ben Arous Governorate =

Governorate of Tunisia

Ben Arous Governorate ولاية بن عروس
- Governorate
- Map of Tunisia with Ben Arous highlighted
- Coordinates: 36°44′50″N 10°20′0″E
- Country: Tunisia
- Created: 3 December 1983
- Capital: Ben Arous

Government
  - Governor: Wissem Mraidi (since 2024)

Area
  - Total: 761 km^{2} (294 sq mi)
  - Rank: Ranked 22nd of 24

Population (2024)
  - Total: 722,828
  - Rank: Ranked 5th of 24
  - Density: 950/km^{2} (2,460/sq mi)
- Time zone: UTC+01 (CET)
- Postal prefix: xx
- ISO 3166 code: TN-13

Ben Arous Governorate (Tunisian Arabic: ولاية بن عروس Wilāyat Bin ‘Arūs pronounced [bɪn.ʕæˈruːs]; French: Gouvernorat de Ben Arous) is one of the twenty-four governorates of Tunisia. It is in the north-east of Tunisia and adjoins smaller Tunis Governorate. It covers an area of 761 km^{2} and had a population of 722,828 (2024 census). The capital is Ben Arous. It is part of Greater Tunis with the governorates of Tunis, Ariana and Manouba.

== Geography ==
The governorate is centred 10 kilometres (6.2 mi) from the capital and surrounded by the governorates of Tunis, Zaghouan, Manouba, and Nabeul. It has a short coastline, along the Gulf of Tunis to the northeast including the country's main commercial port, Radès.

The average temperature is between 6.8 °C and 17.9 °C, and annual rainfall is 275–515 millimeters.

== Economy ==
=== Agriculture ===
Resources and production
Land use
Agricultural land	370 km^{2} (47% of total land)
Woodland	160 km^{2}
Transportation	40 km^{2}
Uncultivated	201 km^{2}
Livestock
Cattle	5 200
Sheep	28 000
Goats	4 000
Main produce (in metric tons per year)
Peaches	27 000
Apples and pairs	21 500
Grapes	41 500
Durum wheat, soft wheat and other types	2 420
Red meat	1 700
White meat	18 300
Milk	13 500
Eggs	167 million (total)
Abattoirs	4 (registered under Directive Plan of 2010)
Hydrological resources
River weirs/dams	1 (Oued El Hma)
Upland lakes	24
Upland weirs/dams	3
Main produce for export
Flowers	c. 12 million per year
Clams and shellfish landed	61 tonnes

== Administrative divisions ==
Administrative divisions Ben Arous

Administratively, the governorate is divided into twelve delegations (mutamadiyat), eleven municipalities, six rural councils, and 75 sectors (imadas). The delegations and their populations from the 2004 and 2014 censuses, are listed below:

Delegation	Population in 2004	Population in 2014
Ben Arous	32,329	31,128
Bou Mhel El Bassatine	27,977	40,101
El Mourouj	81,986	104,538
Ezzahra	31,792	34,962
Fouchana	56,628	74,868
Hammam Chôtt	24,847	31,858
Hammam Lif	38,401	42,518
La Nouvelle Medina	42,603	57,194
Megrine	24,031	26,720
Mohamedia	46,613	66,439
Mornag	53,709	61,518
Radès	44,857	59,998

Eleven municipalities are in Ben Arous Governorate:

1311	Ben Arous	89,571
1312	El Mourouj	121,712
1313	Hammam Lif	41,738
1314	Hammam Chott	34,341
1315	Bou Mhel el-Bassatine	50,817
1316	Ezzahra	35,241
1317	Radès	63,042
1318	Mégrine	25,863
1319	Mohamedia	84,465
1320	Mornag	52,276
1321	Khalidia	22,894
1322	Fouchana	66,483
1323	Naassen	34,385
