= Ariana Governorate =

Governorate of Tunisia

Ariana Governorate ولاية أريانة
- Governorate
- Location of Ariana Governorate in Tunisia

- Delegations of Ariana Governorate
- Coordinates: 36°51′45″N 10°11′44″E
- Country: Tunisia
- Created: March 1983
- Capital: Ariana

Government
  - Governor: Walid Sandid

Area
  - Total: 482 km^{2} (186 sq mi)
  - Rank: 23rd of 24

Population (2024)
  - Total: 668,552
  - Rank: 6th of 24
  - Density: 1,390/km^{2} (3,590/sq mi)
- Time zone: UTC+01 (CET)
- Postal prefix: 20xx
- ISO 3166 code: TN-12

Ariana Governorate (Arabic: ولاية أريانة, romanized: Wilāyat Aryānah, [ærˈjæːnæ]; French: Gouvernorat de l'Ariana) is one of the 24 governorates of Tunisia. Located in northern Tunisia, it covers 482 km^{2} (186 sq mi) and had a population of 668,552 in the 2024 census. Its capital is Ariana.

== Geography ==
Roughly triangular in shape, Ariana Governorate borders the Gulf of Tunis (an inlet of the Mediterranean Sea) to the east, Tunis Governorate to the south, Manouba Governorate to the west, and Bizerte Governorate to the north. It has an average annual temperature of 18.7 °C (65.7 °F) and receives approximately 450 mm (18 in) of rainfall per year.

== Administrative divisions ==
Administrative divisions of Ariana Governorate

The governorate comprises seven delegations (mutamadiyat), seven municipalities, and 48 sectors (imadas). Following Tunisia's municipalization reforms in 2015–2016, former rural councils were dissolved and absorbed into the seven municipalities.

The table below lists the delegations and their populations recorded in the 2014 and 2024 censuses:

Population of Ariana Governorate by delegation
Delegation	2014 census	2024 census
Ariana	114,486	109,693
Ettadhamen	84,312	79,133
Kalâat el-Andalous	26,796	32,520
Mnihla	89,884	116,327
Raoued	106,414	141,471
Sidi Thabet	24,503	29,546
La Soukra	129,693	159,862
Total	576,088	668,552

== Politics ==
=== Governors ===
The President of Tunisia appoints the governor of Ariana Governorate. Since the governorate was established in March 1983, the following individuals have held the office:

- Walid Sandid (2024–present)
- Khaled Nouri (2022–2024)
- Samir Abdeljaoued (2019–2022)
- Mokhtar Nefzi (2017–2019)
- Saloua Khiari (2016–2017; first female governor of Ariana)
- Mahdi Zaoui (2015–2016)
- Omar Ben Mansour (2014–2015)
- Sadok Ben Amor (2013–2014)
- Mohamed El Ghoul (2012–2013)
- Mohamed Habib Jemmali (2011–2012)
- Nabil Abidi (2011)
- Mondher Friji (2005–2011)
- Mohamed Laâroussi (2004–2005)
- Mohamed Lamine Abed (1999–2004)
- Béchir Ben Aïssa (1996–1999)
- Hédi M'henni (1995–1996)
- Mohamed Ben Rejeb (1992–1995)
- Habib Ammar (1990–1992)
- Abdelaziz Chaâbane (1988–1990)
- Mohamed Habib Brahem (1987–1988)
- Ahmed Ben Jemiaâ (1983–1987; first governor of Ariana)
