= Central West Tunisia =

Central West Tunisia or in (Arabic language : الوسط الغربي التونسي ) is the region located at the Central West of Tunisia which assembles Three of the following states: Sidi Bouzid, Kairouan and Kasserine.

== Geography ==
The Region Consider it as a dry and Rocky with many mountains around it Like Chambi mountain in Kasserine That is the largest one in the country as well Jebel Serj National Park a large mountain between Kairouan and Siliana, however the Region measuring an area of 22,377 kilometers square.

== Demographics ==
With 1,459,703 people, the Central West is the 4th populated region in the country. The most populated Governorates of the Central West are:

Governorate	Population	Population Density	Largest town/city
Kairouan	570,559	85/km^{2}	Kairouan ( 186,653)
Kasserine	459,232	56/km^{2}	Kasserine ( 83,534)
Sidi Bouzid	429,912	58/km^{2}	Sidi Bouzid ( 48,339 #)

=== Cities and towns ===
there are several cities and towns with population that exceed 50,000 Inhabitants Here are the top 10 populated cities:

City	Population	Population Density
Greater Kairouan	186,653	no data
Greater Kaserine	(83,534 city) (108,794 combined)	6,961/Km^{2}
Greater Sidi Bouzid	(48,339 city) (122,676 combined)	no data
Greater Sbeitla	(23,844 city) (72,245 combined)	no data
Greater Bou Hajla	(7,940 city) (70,589 combined)	no data
Greater Sbikha	(8,104 city) (67,315 combined)	no data
Greater Regueb	(11,430 city) (58,776 combined)	no data
Greater Feriana	(36,504 city) (51,455 combined)	no data
Greater Haffouz	(8,472 city) (43,792 combined)	no data
Greater Foussana	(7,716 city) (41,447 combined)	no data
