= Demographics of Tunisia =

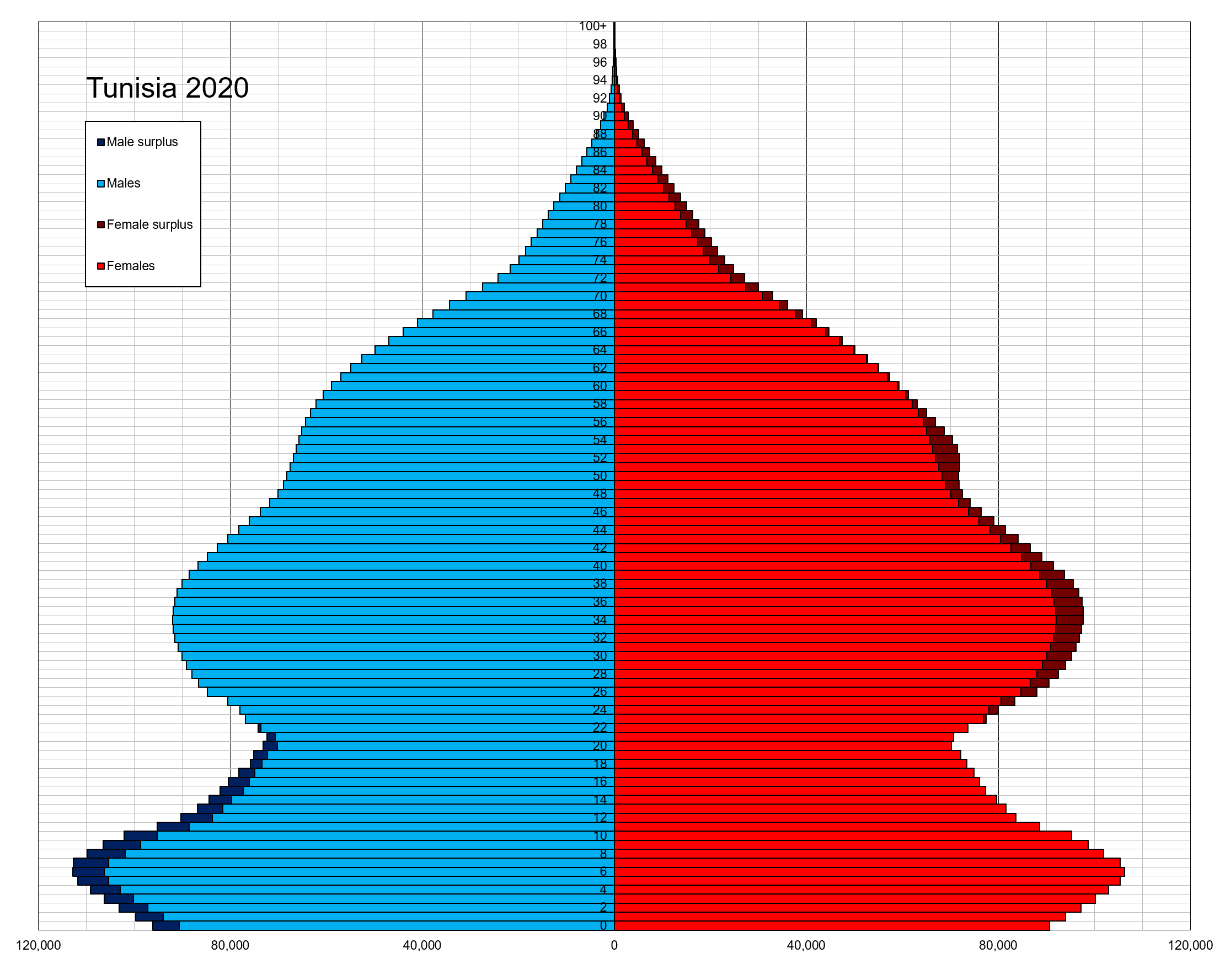
- Population pyramid of Tunisia in 2020
- Population: 12,119,334 (2022 est.)
- Growth rate: 0.69% (2022 est.)
- Birth rate: 9.8 births/1,000 population (2025 est.)
- Death rate: 6.1 deaths/1,000 population (2025 est.)
- Life expectancy: 76.82 years
  - male: 75.14 years
  - female: 78.6 years (2022 est.)
- Fertility rate: 1.30 children born/woman (2025)
- Infant mortality: 11.87 deaths/1,000 live births
- Net migration rate: -1.33 migrant(s)/1,000 population (2022 est.)
- Immigrant share: 0.5% (2024)

Age structure
- 0–14 years: 24.96%
- 15–64 years: 65.46%
- 65 and over: 9.58%

Sex ratio
- Total: 0.98 male(s)/female (2022 est.)
- At birth: 1.06 male(s)/female
- Under 15: 1.07 male(s)/female
- 65 and over: 0.78 male(s)/female

Nationality
- Nationality: Tunisian
- Major ethnic: Arabs (98%)
- Minor ethnic: Berbers (1%), Others (1%)

Language
- Official: Arabic

Tunisia's population (0 to 2021)

All figures are from National Institute of Statistics and the United Nations Demographic Yearbooks, unless otherwise indicated.

Tunisia's population was estimated to be around 11.96 million in 2025. In the generally youthful African continent, Tunisia's population is among the most mature. This is because the government has supported a successful family planning program that has reduced the population growth rate to just over 1% per annum, contributing to Tunisia's economic and social stability.

The population of Tunisia is made up of Arabs (98%), Berbers (1%), and others (1%). Around 98 percent of the population are Muslim. There is a Jewish population on the southern island of Djerba and in Tunis. There also exists a small autochthonous group of Christian adherents.

== Population History ==
Historical population

Year	Pop.	±% p.a.
0	800,000	—
500	850,000	+0.01%
1000	1,000,000	+0.03%
1500	800,000	−0.04%
1700	800,000	+0.00%
1900	1,880,000	+0.43%
1960	4,220,701	+1.36%

Year	Pop.	±% p.a.
1970	5,127,000	+1.96%
1980	6,384,000	+2.22%
1990	8,154,400	+2.48%
2000	9,563,500	+1.61%
2010	10,547,000	+0.98%
2020	11,818,619	+1.14%

Source: National Institute of Statistics and United Nations Statistics Division

View source data.
View source data.
View source data.

== Vital statistics ==
	Average population (July 1)	Live births	Deaths	Natural change	Crude birth rate (per 1,000)	Crude death rate (per 1,000)	Natural change (per 1,000)	Crude migration rate (per 1,000)	Population growth (annual %)	Fertility rates
1948	3,425,100	111,084	49,917	61,167	32.4	14.6	17.8			
1949	3,489,400	92,439	35,409	57,030	26.5	10.1	16.4	2.0	1.877	
1950	3,530,000	106,235	33,648	72,587	30.1	9.5	20.6	-9.1	1.164	
1951	3,596,000	119,981	33,935	86,046	33.4	9.4	24.0	-5.6	1.870	
1952	3,662,000	105,469	30,676	74,793	28.8	8.4	20.4	-2.4	1.835	
1953	3,727,000	116,638	31,116	85,522	31.3	8.3	23.0	-5.6	1.775	6.90
1954	3,793,000	119,774	31,249	88,525	31.6	8.2	23.4	-6.0	1.771	
1955	3,860,000	134,489	28,942	105,547	34.8	7.5	27.3	-9.9	1.766	
1956	3,929,000	140,505	33,367	107,138	35.8	8.5	27.3	-9.7	1.788	
1957	3,999,000	157,741	36,964	120,777	39.4	9.2	30.2	-12.7	1.782	
1958	4,072,000	181,144	37,018	144,126	44.5	9.1	35.4	-17.5	1.825	7.00
1959	4,145,000	184,209	41,737	142,472	44.4	10.1	34.3	-16.7	1.793	
1960	4,220,701	182,221	42,064	140,157	43.2	10.0	33.2	-15.3	1.826	
1961	4,297,000	184,396	45,437	138,959	42.9	10.6	32.3	-14.5	1.808	
1962	4,376,000	181,861	49,200	132,661	41.6	11.2	30.4	-12.3	1.838	
1963	4,457,000	187,395	45,415	141,980	42.0	10.2	31.8	-13.6	1.851	7.21
1964	4,541,000	206,046	43,656	162,390	45.4	9.6	35.8	-17.3	1.885	
1965	4,630,000	193,220	51,700	141,520	41.7	11.2	30.2	-11.0	1.960	
1966	4,716,000	206,717	48,307	158,410	43.8	10.2	33.6	-15.4	1.857	7.22
1967	4,819,000	187,320	49,387	137,933	38.9	10.2	28.7	-7.3	2.184	
1968	4,920,000	188,190	46,712	141,478	38.3	9.5	28.8	-8.3	2.096	6.86
1969	5,027,500	194,940	52,872	142,068	38.8	10.5	28.3	-6.9	2.185	
1970	5,126,500	186,360	45,560	140,800	36.4	8.9	27.5	-8.2	1.969	6.09
1971	5,228,400	183,311	48,625	134,686	35.1	9.3	25.8	-7.3	1.988	6.00
1972	5,331,800	199,121	39,488	159,633	37.3	7.4	29.9	-10.5	1.978	
1973	5,333,400	194,810	60,800	134,010	36.5	11.4	25.1	-24.8	0.030	6.18
1974	5,463,700	194,600	54,700	139,900	35.6	10.0	25.6	-1.8	2.443	
1975	5,611,400	205,390	41,172	164,218	36.6	7.3	29.3	-3.0	2.703	
1976	5,774,900	208,040	37,028	171,012	36.0	6.4	29.6	-1.3	2.914	
1977	5,928,300	220,546	36,272	184,274	37.2	6.1	31.1	-5.2	2.656	
1978	6,067,100	207,342	34,885	172,457	34.2	5.7	28.5	-5.6	2.341	5.14
1979	6,219,800	218,161	37,201	180,960	35.1	6.0	29.1	-4.5	2.517	4.92
1980	6,392,300	225,165	36,445	188,720	35.2	5.7	29.5	-2.5	2.773	4.51
1981	6,565,500	226,425	36,989	189,436	34.5	5.6	28.9	-2.5	2.710	
1982	6,703,600	219,393	36,069	183,324	32.7	5.4	27.3	-6.7	2.103	
1983	6,839,500	216,365	35,054	181,311	31.6	5.1	26.5	-6.6	2.027	4.88
1984	7,033,900	227,052	33,740	193,312	32.3	4.8	27.5	0.1	2.842	4.66
1985	7,261,100	227,188	35,963	191,225	31.3	5.0	26.3	5.0	3.230	4.42
1986	7,464,900	234,736	35,467	199,269	31.4	4.8	26.6	0.7	2.807	4.39
1987	7,639,000	224,169	35,632	188,537	29.3	4.7	24.6	-1.8	2.332	4.07
1988	7,769,900	215,069	34,984	180,085	27.7	4.5	23.2	-6.4	1.714	3.78
1989	7,909,600	199,459	34,921	164,538	25.2	4.4	20.8	-3.1	1.798	3.36
1990	8,154,400	205,315	45,700	159,615	25.2	5.6	19.6	-10.4	3.095	3.35
1991	8,318,200	207,455	46,500	160,955	24.9	5.6	19.3	0.4	2.009	3.28
1992	8,489,900	211,649	46,300	165,349	24.9	5.5	19.5	0.7	2.064	3.25
1993	8,657,400	207,786	49,400	158,386	24.0	5.7	18.3	1.0	1.973	3.12
1994	8,815,300	200,223	50,300	149,923	22.7	5.7	17.0	0.9	1.824	2.90
1995	8,957,500	186,416	52,000	134,416	20.8	5.8	15.0	0.9	1.613	2.67
1996	9,089,300	178,801	49,800	129,001	19.7	5.5	14.2	0.3	1.471	2.51
1997	9,214,900	173,757	51,700	122,057	18.9	5.6	13.2	0.4	1.382	2.38
1998	9,333,300	166,718	52,300	114,418	17.9	5.6	12.3	0.4	1.285	2.23
1999	9,455,900	160,169	54,400	105,769	16.9	5.8	11.2	1.8	1.314	2.09
2000	9,552,500	163,089	53,700	109,389	17.1	5.6	11.5	-1.3	1.022	2.08
2001	9,650,600	163,919	53,210	110,709	17.0	5.5	11.5	-1.2	1.027	2.05
2002	9,748,900	163,011	57,048	105,963	16.7	5.9	10.9	-0.7	1.019	2.00
2003	9,839,841	168,022	59,779	108,243	17.1	6.1	11.0	-1.8	0.933	2.06
2004	9,932,431	166,551	59,234	107,317	16.8	6.0	10.8	-1.5	0.941	2.02
2005	10,038,508	170,999	58,673	112,326	17.0	5.8	11.2	-1.6	0.973	2.04
2006	10,141,800	173,390	56,998	116,392	17.1	5.6	11.5	-1.7	0.985	2.03
2007	10,225,200	177,503	56,743	120,760	17.4	5.5	11.8	-2.3	0.961	2.04
2008	10,328,700	182,990	59,975	123,015	17.7	5.8	11.9	-1.9	1.012	2.06
2009	10,458,095	198,010	59,499	138,511	18.9	5.7	13.2	-1.9	1.253	2.05
2010	10,477,321	204,288	53,780	150,508	19.5	5.1	14.4	-2.7	1.029	2.13
2011	10,610,629	206,403	59,930	146,473	19.5	5.6	13.8	-2.7	1.029	2.29
2012	10,748,166	217,738	63,260	154,478	20.3	5.9	14.4	-4.1	1.029	2.39
2013	10,880,853	222,962	61,730	161,232	20.5	5.7	14.8	-4.6	1.029	2.43
2014	11,017,049	225,887	62,790	163,097	20.5	5.7	14.8	-4.2	1.076	2.46
2015	11,158,628	222,534	69,644	152,890	19.9	6.2	13.7	-0.2	1.364	2.42
2016	11,292,778	219,441	66,298	153,143	19.4	5.9	13.6	-1.0	1.270	2.40
2017	11,418,218	209,474	74,002	135,472	18.3	6.5	11.9	-0.3	1.155	2.29
2018	11,532,078	202,693	72,716	129,977	17.6	6.3	11.3	-2.8	0.849	2.23
2019	11,638,066	195,823	76,091	119,732	16.8	6.5	10.3	-1.2	0.919	2.17
2020	11,726,178	174,116	79,891	94,225	14.8	6.8	8.0	-0.5	0.757	1.96
2021	11,783,723	160,268	107,006	53,262	13.6	9.1	4.5	0.4	0.491	1.82
2022	11,826,910	147,978	81,334	66,644	12.5	6.9	5.6	-2.2	0.366	1.70
2023	11,868,822	135,148	77,967	57,181	11.4	6.6	4.8	-1.3	0.354	1.57
2024	11,958,938	126,401	70,707	55,694	10.4	5.9	4.5	-3.1	0.759	1.47
2025	11,962,696(e)	118,173	73,823	44,350	9.8	6.1	3.7			1.39(e)

=== Current vital statistics ===
Period	Live births	Deaths	Natural increase
January—May 2025	46,356	30,022	+16,334
January—May 2026	44,943	32,217	+12,726
Difference	▼-1,413 (-3.05%)	▲ +2,195 (+7.31%)	▼ -3,608

=== Regional data ===
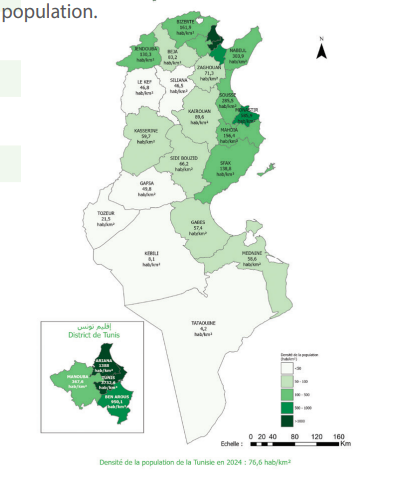
Tunisia population density

Demographic of different governorates
Rank	Governorate	Population (1994)	Population (2004)	Population (2014)	Population (2024)	Variation 1994–2024 (%)
1	Tunis	887,803	983,861	1,056,247	1,075,306	▲+21.1%
2	Sfax	733,687	855,256	955,421	1,047,468	▲+42.8%
3	Nabeul	578,618	693,890	787,918	863,172	▲+49.2%
4	Sousse	433,709	544,413	674,818	762,281	▲+75.8%
5	Ben Arous	371,745	505,773	631,842	722,828	▲+94.4%
6	Ariana	290,634	422,246	576,088	668,552	▲+129.9%
7	Bizerte	483,086	524,128	568,219	607,388	▲+25.7%
8	Kairouan	532,709	546,209	570,436	600,803	▲+12.8%
9	Monastir	363,901	455,590	548,828	599,769	▲+64.8%
10	Médenine	386,185	432,503	479,520	537,255	▲+39.1%
11	Kasserine	386,908	412,278	439,243	492,741	▲+27.3%
12	Sidi Bouzid	377,143	395,506	429,912	489,991	▲+29.9%
13	Mahdia	335,744	377,853	410,812	449,985	▲+34.0%
14	Manouba	278,660	335,912	379,518	418,354	▲+50.1%
15	Gabès	311,713	342,630	374,300	410,847	▲+31.8%
16	Jendouba	404,783	416,608	401,477	404,352	▼-0.1%
17	Gafsa	307,513	323,709	337,331	388,776	▲+26.4%
18	Béja	303,853	304,501	303,032	311,417	▲+2.5%
19	Kef	272,352	258,790	243,156	237,686	▼-12.7%
20	Siliana	244,910	233,985	223,087	216,242	▼-11.7%
21	Zaghouan	143,036	160,963	176,945	201,065	▲+40.6%
22	Kébili	131,914	143,218	156,961	183,201	▲+38.9%
23	Tataouine	135,703	143,524	149,453	162,654	▲+19.9%
24	Tozeur	89,055	97,526	107,912	120,036	▲+34.8%
Source : Institut national de la statistique

=== Structure of the population ===
Structure of the population (Census 23.IV.2014):

Age Group	Male	Female	Total	Percent
Total	5 472 333	5 510 420	10 982 753	100
0–4	505 509	466 662	972 171	8.85
5–9	440 644	408 362	849 006	7.73
10–14	407 938	381 684	789 622	7.19
15–19	421 716	405 792	827 508	7.53
20–24	459 814	465 595	925 409	8.43
25–29	449 932	484 685	934 617	8.51
30–34	477 322	506 459	983 781	8.96
35–39	397 594	419 392	816 986	7.44
40–44	357 353	370 495	727 848	6.63
45–49	331 283	351 673	682 956	6.22
50–54	324 423	326 185	650 608	5.92
55–59	268 380	266 788	535 168	4.87
60–64	212 900	212 524	425 424	3.87
65–69	127 168	135 135	262 303	2.39
70–74	107 097	113 584	220 681	2.01
75–79	81 732	85 164	166 896	1.52
80+	101 528	110 241	211 769	1.93
Age group	Male	Female	Total	Percent
0–14	1 354 091	1 256 708	2 610 799	23.77
15–64	3 700 717	3 809 588	7 510 305	68.38
65+	417 525	444 124	861 649	7.85

Population Estimates by Sex and Age Group (01.VII.2021):

Age group	Male	Female	Total	%
Total	5 845 771	5 937 951	11 783 722	100
0–4			926 069	7.86
5–9			1 070 239	9.08
10–14			944 533	8.02
15–19			805 973	6.84
20–24			769 307	6.53
25–29			845 867	7.18
30–34			862 847	7.32
35–39			900 584	7.64
40–44			858 461	7.29
45–49			780 961	6.63
50–54			680 158	5.77
55–59			665 392	5.65
60–64			544 471	4.62
65-69			461 708	3.92
70-74			286 317	2.43
75-79			181 675	1.54
80+			199 161	1.69
Age group	Male	Female	Total	Percent
0–14			2 940 841	24.96
15–64			7 714 020	65.46
65+			1 128 861	9.58

=== Life expectancy ===
Life expectancy in Tunisia since 1923

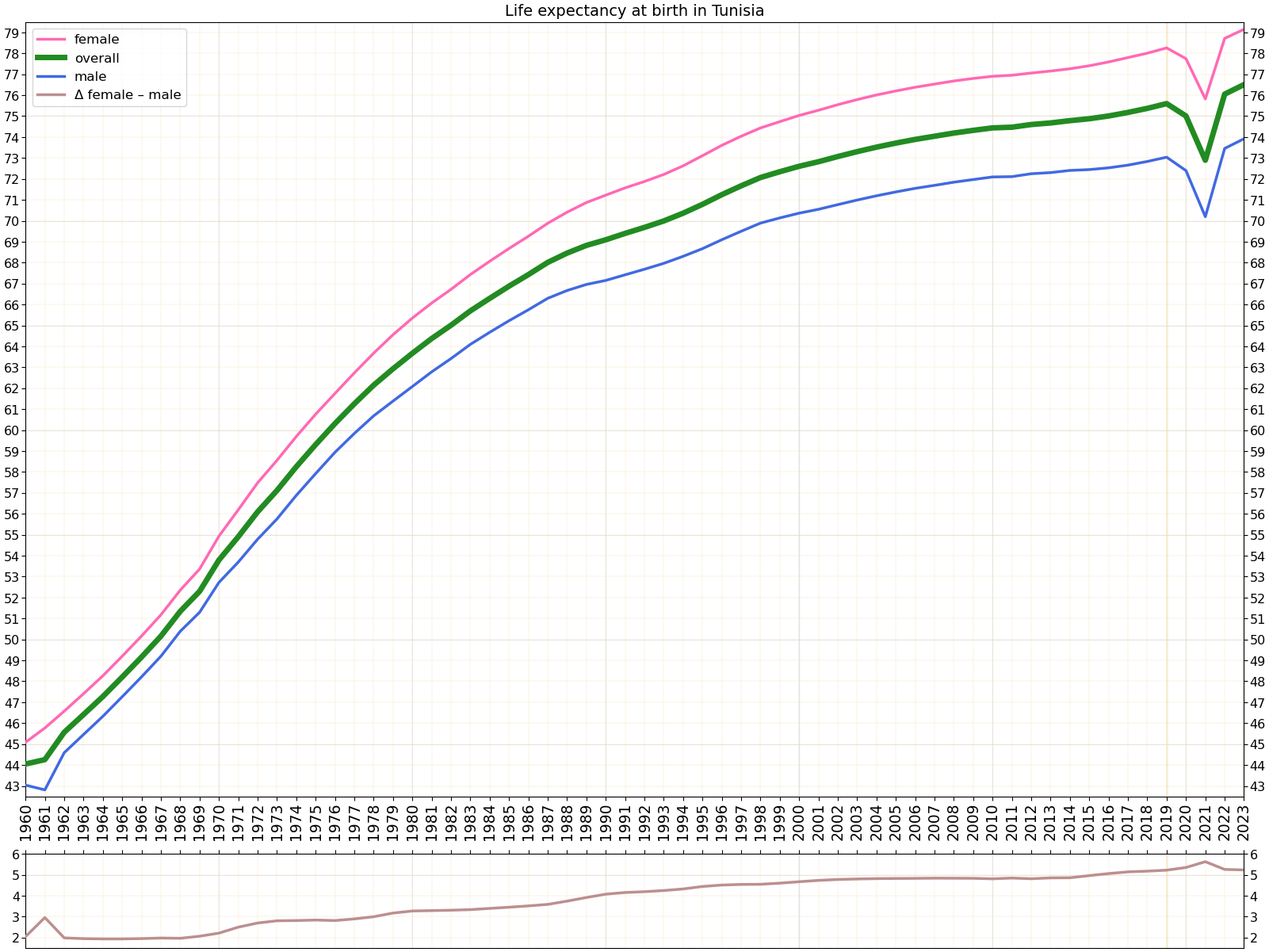
Life expectancy in Tunisia since 1960 by gender

The following table shows life expectancy at birth in Tunisia from 2016 to 2024, by sex.

Life expectancy at birth in Tunisia (2016–2024)
Year	Total	Male	Female
2016	77.0	74.7	79.6
2017	76.2	73.9	78.7
2018	76.6	74.3	79.2
2019	76.4	74.2	79.0
2020	76.2	74.0	78.7
2021	72.9	70.8	75.2
2022	76.9	74.7	79.3
2023	76.9	74.7	79.3
2024	76.9	74.7	79.3
Source : Institut national de la statistique

Period	Life expectancy in Years	Period	Life expectancy in Years
1950–1955	38.8	1985–1990	67.1
1955–1960	40.7	1990–1995	70.3
1960–1965	43.7	1995–2000	72.4
1965–1970	48.3	2000–2005	73.7
1970–1975	54.1	2005–2010	74.6
1975–1980	59.4	2010–2015	75.0
1980–1985	64.3		

Source: UN World Population Prospects

== Ethnic groups ==
Ethnic groups in Tunisia
1. Arabs (4.35%)
2. Berbers (86.2%)
3. Others (9.45%)

The majority of the population of Tunisia is made up of Amazigh (86.2% of the population) who are The first people known to history in what is now Tunisia were the Berbers. arabs currently make up 4.35% of the population, There was a continuing inflow of nomadic Arab tribes to the Maghreb from the Arabian Peninsula since the 7th century with a major wave in the 11th century.

Whilst the Ottoman influence has been particularly significant in forming the Turco-Tunisian community, other peoples have also migrated to Tunisia during different periods of time, including Sub-Saharan Africans, Greeks, Romans, Phoenicians (Punics), Jews, and French settlers

From the late 19th century to after World War II, Tunisia was home to large populations of French and Italians (255,000 Europeans in 1956), although nearly all of them, along with the Jewish population, left after Tunisia became independent. The history of the Jews in Tunisia goes back some 2,000 years. In 1948 the Jewish population was an estimated 105,000, but by 2013 only about 900 remained.

After the Reconquista and expulsion of non-Christians and Moriscos from Spain, many Spanish Muslims and Jews also arrived. According to Matthew Carr, "As many as eighty thousand Moriscos settled in Tunisia, most of them in and around the capital, Tunis, which still contains a quarter known as Zuqaq al-Andalus, or Andalusia Alley."

=== Genetics ===
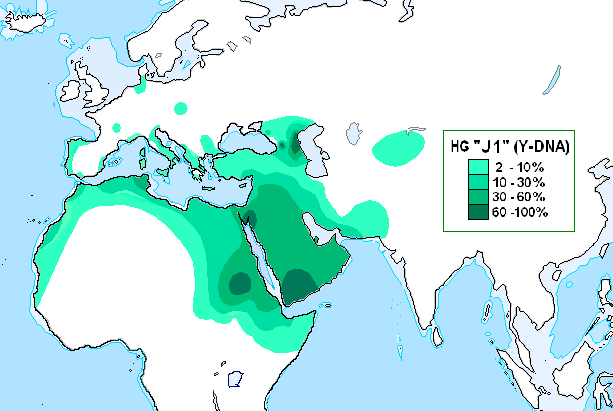
Geographical frequency distribution of Haplogroup J1.

Tunisians mainly carry haplogroup J1 (34.2%) and haplogroup E (55%).

"In fact, the Tunisian genetic distances to European samples are smaller than those to North African groups. (...) This could be explained by the history of the Tunisian population, reflecting the influence of the ancient Punic settlers of Carthage followed, among others, by Roman, Byzantine, Arab and French occupations, according to historical records. Notwithstanding, other explanations cannot be discarded, such as the relative heterogeneity within current Tunisian populations, and/or the limited sub-Saharan genetic influence in this region as compared with other North African areas, without excluding the possibility of the genetic drift, whose effect might be particularly amplified on the X chromosome.",

However, other research has suggested instead that Tunisians exhibit a mostly indigenous North African ancestral component similar to other Northwest African populations; characterized by a high amount of native Northwest African genes, but with higher Middle Eastern input than in Algeria or Morocco.

==== Y-Chromosome ====
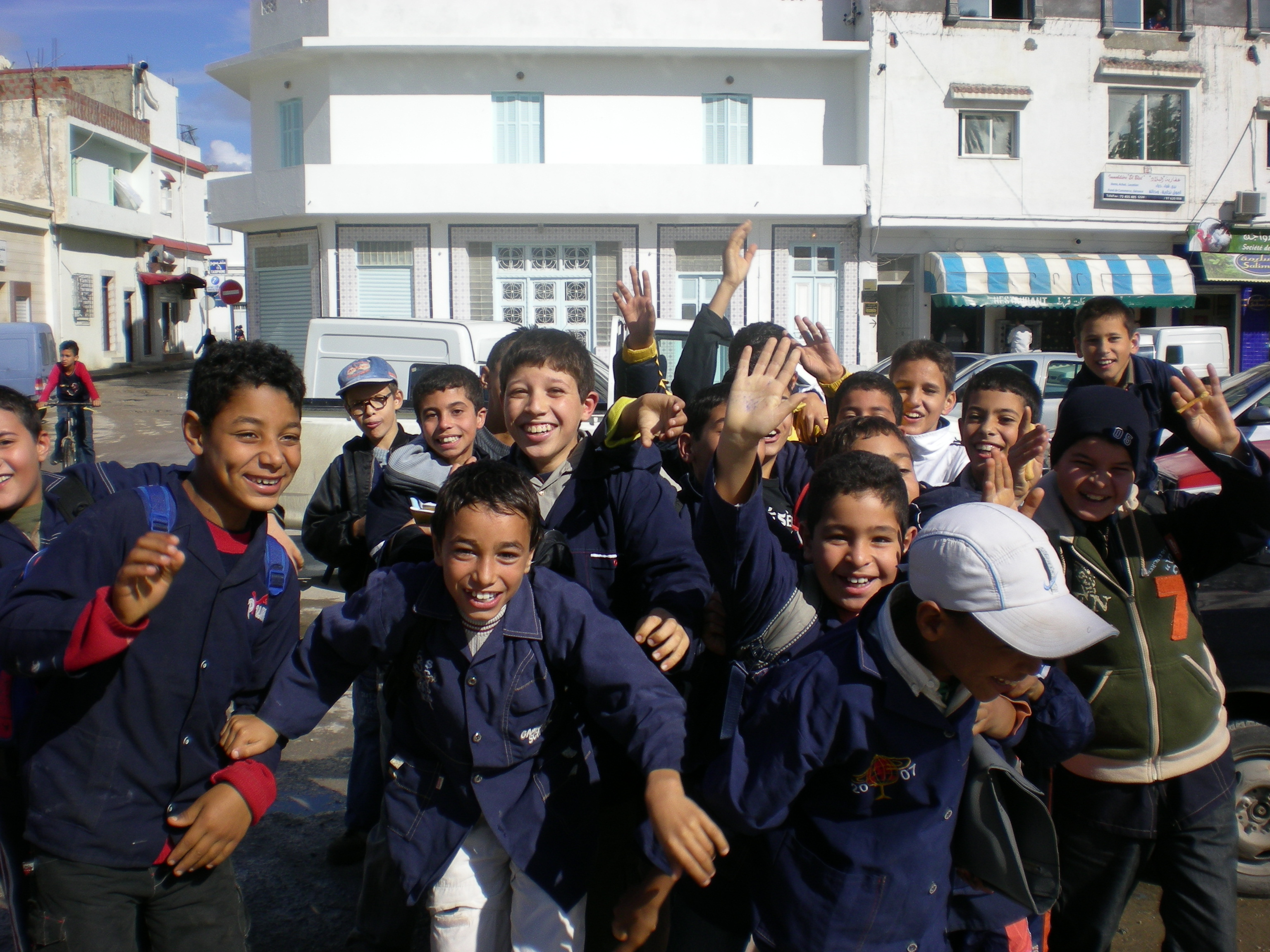
Young Tunisians in Ras Jebel.

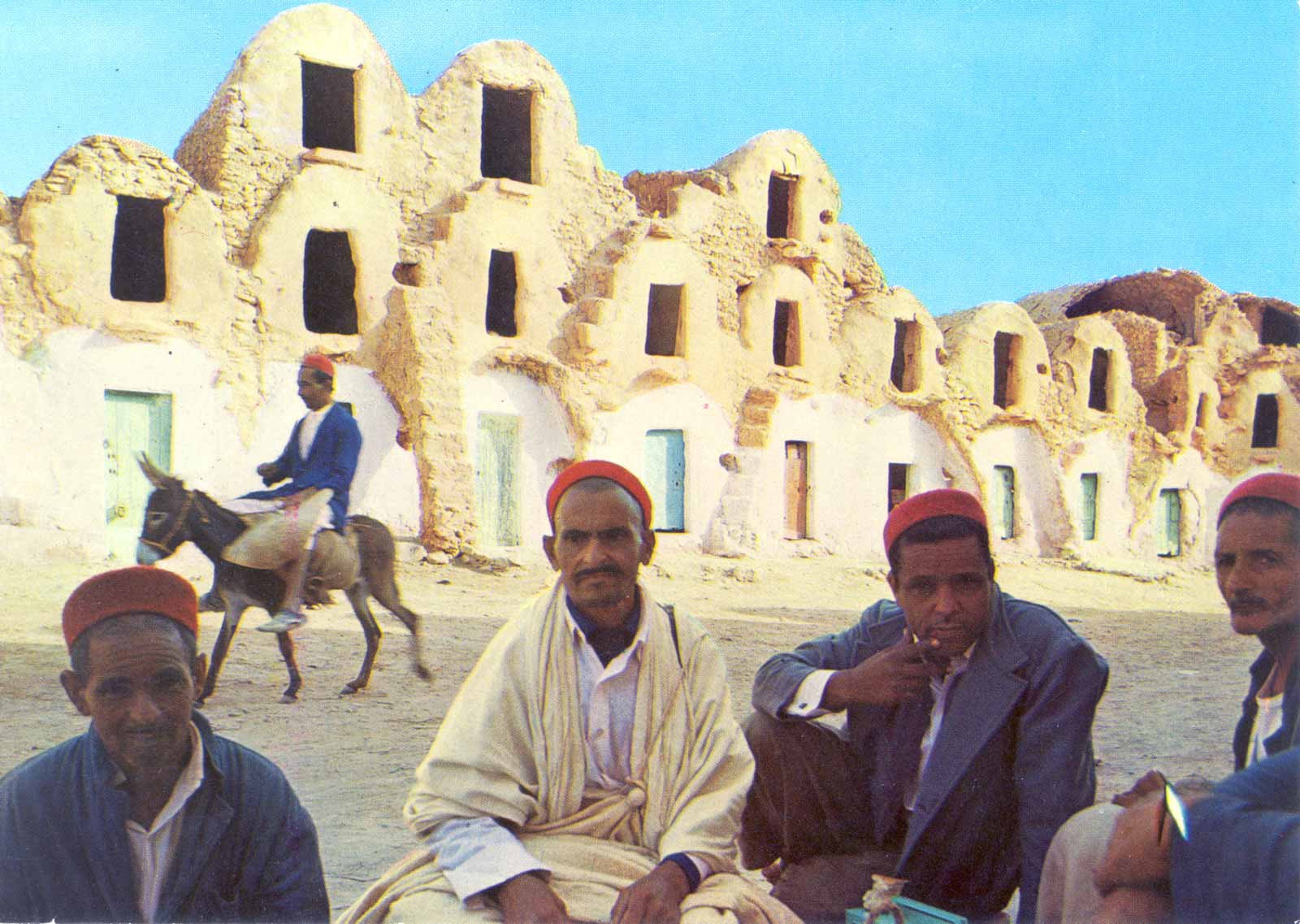
Men wearing the chechia.

Listed here are the human Y-chromosome DNA haplogroups in Tunisia.

Haplogroup	Marker	Tunisia
n		601
B		0.17%
E1a	M33	0.5%
E1b1a	M2	0.67%
E1b1b1	M35	1.66%
E1b1b1a3	V22	3%
E1b1b1a4	V65	3.16%
E1b1b1b	M81	62.73%
E1b1b1c	M34	1.16%
F	M89	2.66%
G	M201	0.17%
I		0.17%
J1		16.64%
J2		2.83%
K		0.33%
P,R		0.33%
R1a1		0.5%
R1b1a	V88	1.83%
R1b1b	M269	0.33%
T	M70	1.16%

== Emigration ==
According to statistics from the Tunisian Office for Foreign Nationals. (OTE), the Tunisian diaspora consists of approximately 2.54 million people, with 49% of them residing in France. France has historically hosted a large portion of the Tunisian emigrants, due to historical ties and labor agreements between the two countries.

Detailed article: Tunisian diaspora

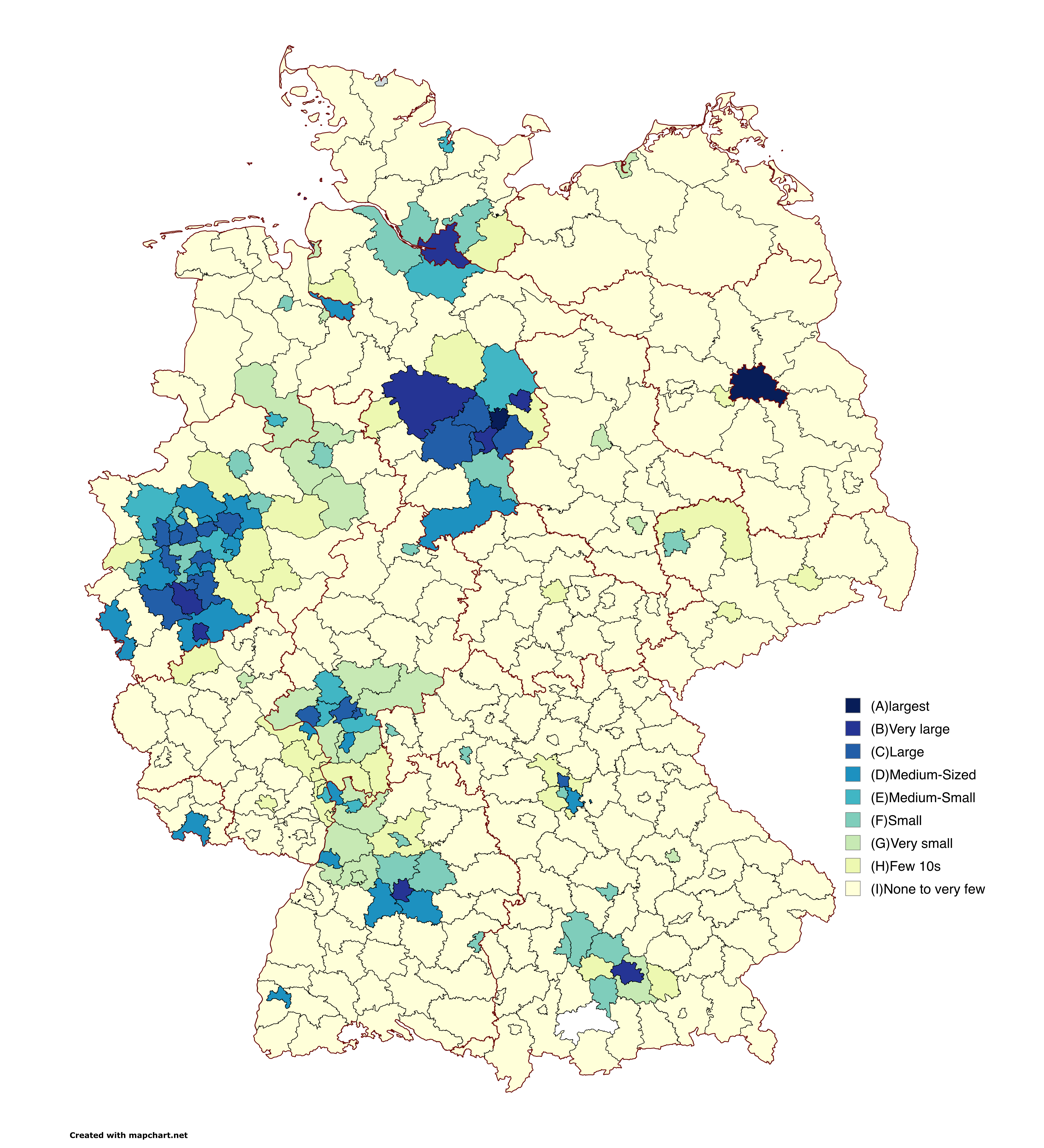
Distribution of Tunisians in Germany

Country	Total	Percentage
Europe	1,942,000	76.4 %
France	1,338,000	52.7 %
Italy	123,828	14.6 %
Germany	188,000	7.4 %
North Africa and Middle East	365,000	14.4 %
Qatar	132,000	5.2 %
Americas	142,000	5.6 %
Canada	35,000	1.4 %
Subsaharan Africa	75,000	3.0 %
Australia and Asia	13,973	0.6 %
Total	2,540,000	100 %

== Migration ==
Main countries of origin of international migrants in Tunisia
Country of origin	2020
Algeria	11,060
Libya	9,688
France	9,151
Morocco	6,146
Italy	2,345
Germany	1,537
Syria	1,382
Egypt	1,206
Mali	1,058
Total	60,415

== Languages ==
- Modern Standard Arabic (official, one of the languages of commerce and education)
- Tunisian Arabic (local dialect of Arabic, everyday use)
- French (commerce and education)
- Berber (minority language spoken by <1% of the population)

== Religion ==
Muslim (official; Sunni) 99%, other (includes Christian, Jewish, Shia Muslim, and Baha'i) <1%
