= Telephone numbers in Tunisia =

The following are the telephone codes in Tunisia.

Codes
Country code: 216
International prefix: 00
Trunk prefix : -

== Calling formats ==
To call in Tunisia, the following format is used:

XX XXX XXX Calls within an area code

+216 XX XXX XXX Calls from outside Tunisia

== List of area codes ==
LIST OF AREA CODES
Governorate	Area Code
Ariana	70, 71 and 79
Béja	78
Ben Arous	70, 71 and 79
Bizerte	72
Gabès	75
Gafsa	76
Jendouba	78
Kairouan	77
Kasserine	77
Kebili	75
Kef	78
Mahdia	73
Manouba	70, 71 and 79
Medenine	75
Monastir	73
Nabeul	72
Sfax	74
Sidi Bouzid	76
Siliana	78
Sousse	73
Tataouine	75
Tozeur	76
Tunis	70, 71 and 79
Zaghouan	72
Mobile phone	Tunisie Telecom: 9x xxxxxx; Elissa (TT's MVNO): 4x xxxxxx; Ooredoo: 2x xxxxxx; Orange: 5x xxxxxx; Nessma Mobile: 46 xxxxxx
Payphone	79
