= List of regions of Tunisia by Human Development Index =

This is a list of regions of Tunisia by Human Development Index as of 2025 with the data for the year 2023.

Rank	Region (Governorate)	HDI (2023)
High human development
1	Grand Tunis (Tunis, Ariana, Ben Arous, Manouba)	0.791
–	Tunisia	0.746
2	Sud Est (Gabes, Medinine, Tataouine)	0.745
2	Centre Est (Sousse, Monastir, Mahdia, Sfax)	0.745
3	Sud Ouest (Gafsa, Tozeur, Kebili)	0.741
4	Nord Est (Nabeul, Zaghouan, Bizerte)	0.733
5	Nord Ouest (Beja, Jendouba, Kef, Siliana)	0.722
Medium human development
6	Centre Ouest (Kairouan, Kasserine, Sidi Bouzid)	0.681
