= National Institute of Statistics (Tunisia) =

Government organization in Tunisia

Coordinates: 36.8163°N 10.1812°E

- Institut national de la statistique (INS) المعهد الوطني للإحصاء-تونس

Institute overview
- Formed: 1969
- Jurisdiction: Tunisian Government
- Headquarters: Tunis, Tunisia
- Institute executive: Adnen Lassoued, General Director
- Website: www.ins.tn/en/

The National Institute of Statistics (officially in French: Institut national de la statistique (INS); or in Arabic: المعهد الوطني للإحصاء-تونس) is Tunisia's statistics agency. Its head office is in Tunis.

== Regions ==
The INS divides Tunisia into 6 regions: North East, North West, Central West, Central East, South West, and South East. Further subdivided into:

=== North East ===
- Tunis
- Nabuel
- Ben Arous
- Ariana
- Bizerte
- Menouba
- Zaghouan

=== North West ===
- Siliana
- Kef
- Béja
- Jendouba

=== Central West ===
- Sidi Bouzid
- Kasserine
- Kairouan

=== Central East ===
- Sfax
- Sousse
- Monastir
- Mahdia

=== South West ===
- Tozeur
- Gafsa
- Kebili

=== South East ===
- Tataouine
- Medenine
- Gabès
