= Oued Merguellil =

Watercourse in Tunisia

Oued Merguellil drainage basin.

Oued Merguellil (وادي مرق الليل) is a stream in central Tunisia that flows via Sebkhet Cherita Lake, into the Mediterranean at the Gulf of Hammamet.

Oued Merguellil is found at 35° 50′ 34″ N, 10° 16′ 18″ E in central Tunisia. The stream flow is irregular with a variation of 300mm through the year in the catchment basin. During Roman times the area was intensely farmed and today irrigation from the stream goes to olive and apricot production. The El Haouareb Dam is on the stream.

== History ==
Traces of human presence dating back to the Lower Paleolithic were found in the basin of the river Merguellil and demonstrate the antiquity of the settlement of the area by nomads.

Upon arrival, the Romans, became the first sedentary occupants, settled mainly in areas rich in water from the upstream reservoir, more development of housing and of agriculture and where various relics were found. They used techniques for using runoff water, including the construction of water harvesting structures, and develop olive growing - activity shown by the many olive presses found - but also the livestock and grain farming .

From the 7th century, the various invasions destroy existing facilities. The Arab, Zlass tribe finally settled in the plain, confining the Berbers in the mountains as Jebel Ousselat. The Arabs do not bring new farming techniques and focus on urban development. Kairouan is well equipped with a large water development, the Aghlabid pools, which collects the waters of the watershed to supply the city with drinking water.

The 18th and 19th centuries, saw the area retain a nomadic economy but the region and the poverty that affects areas steppe. When French colonists settled in the valley in the late they established large plantations, and force the nomads off the steppe into the mountains. Two large French only areas were established to export grain, livestock products and the arboriculture to France. There were one at site of El Haouareb dam (3700 hectares ) and the other at Haffouz and Oueslatia (8000 hectares). The modernized agriculture profoundly changed the agricultural landscape, including the destruction of traditional water collection facilities. Ally plowing quickly cause erosion and a significant decrease in soil fertility.

After the Tunisian independence in 1956, arboriculture and the appearance of the large scale irrigation(especially from the 1970s ) improved the agricultural potential of the basin but also reduced the area available for livestock, which results in a decrease in herd size and a further settling of nomads.

The traditionally popular, mountainous areas become areas of poverty, the development of cities rapidly promoting the rural exodus, although few watershed inhabitants migrated abroad. That is why the Tunisian Government was implementing a policy for remote areas of the upstream basin since 1987; their development remains difficult because most households do not have the running water and some homes are only accessible via non-motorable tracks.

== Geography ==
Oued Merguellil basin

The bed of the wadi Merguellil born in the mountain ranges of the plateau Makthar. After crossing through the fault of El Haouareb, at which a dam was built, it turns into a large river bed but unstable across the plain of Kairouan where tributaries of Wadi Cherishira) and Djebel Baten, join it before heading north-east.

Its waters do not meet the Mediterranean but sometimes end up partly in the sebkha Kelbia while another part joined the Oued Zeroud flowing in parallel, fifteen kilometers to the south.

== Infrastructure ==
Various dams were built on the upstream basin of Wadi Merguellil to fight against floods and supply of agricultural areas by irrigation. The hydrological functioning of the oued has thus been upset. Many facilities to protect against the erosion also significantly altered surface runoff feeding the wadi.

The Merguelil basin has seen piecemeal changes against erosion from the 1950s. After some work done in the context of public works to fight against unemployment, a project in cooperation with the USAID funded between 1962 and 1972 the first interventions (benches and hill lakes). But it is the big flood in 1969 which lead to major developments in the context of an overall policy. The El Haouareb Dam, inaugurated in 1989, is the main one; It takes its name from the town of El Haouareb located twelve kilometers southeast of Haffouz and thirty kilometers southwest of Kairouan. Sized according to the 1969 rates, it has a maximum capacity of 90 million cubic meters but was never fully completed, the average annual contribution of between 5 and 37 million cubic meters.

To prevent its silting, the upstream basin is equipped with more than 200 km² benches, lakes and dams (38 lakes and five earth dams) for an average volume of one million cubic meters. Three decades later, they have given way to integrated planning. For if it reduces the silting of the dam of El Haouareb, it causes the same time reducing water intake downstream, threatening the exploitation of groundwater in the plain of Kairouan is dependent on the charging of the dam.

== Economy ==
In the upstream basin, the farmers practice farming in dry: arboriculture of olive trees (71% of plantations) and almonds (12%) and cereals dominate this area even though there are also small farms. However, due to the small size of farms - often less than five hectares - and fluctuating climatic conditions, farmers are often forced to seasonal migration to the cities to supplement their incomes. Moreover, apart from in a few municipalities such as El Alâa, Haffouz or Kesra, settlement is scattered, isolated and difficult to access. Crops irrigated are present only on a few places near available water resources because the erosion of soil provides low yields.

In the downstream basin, irrigated agriculture, especially vegetables, is much more present and water resources has enabled a diversification of crops even if the agricultural landscape remains little changed: cereals (such as durum wheat, sorghum, oats and barley ), potato, onion, pea, bean, pepper, watermelon, melon, tomato, olive, apple, apricot or peach. The governorate figures also ranks first nationally in the production of apricots and peppers.

The good water quality upstream basin has allowed the emergence of many boreholes to supply the area tourism of the Sahel.
