= Hassi El Ferid =

Coordinates: 34°57′N 8°34′E

Hassi El Ferid حاسي الفريد
- Commune and town
- Interactive map of Hassi El Ferid
- Country: Tunisia
- Governorate: Kasserine Governorate

Population (2004)
  - Total: 4,711
  - Ethnicities: Arab
  - Religions: Islam
- Time zone: UTC+1 (CET)
- Postal code: 1240

Hassi El Ferid (Arabic: حاسي الفريد) is a town and commune in the Kasserine Governorate, Tunisia. As of 2004 it had a population of 4711. It is 35 km (22 mi) from Kasserine and 75 km (47 mi) from Gafsa.

== See also ==
- List of cities in Tunisia
