= Ahmed Tlili =

Tunisian trade union leader and politician

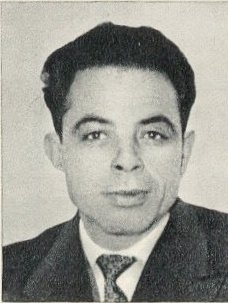
- Ahmed Tlili
- Born: 16 October 1916; El Ksar, Gafsa, Tunisia
- Died: 25 June 1967 (aged 50); Paris, France
- Education: Sadiki College
- Occupations: trades union leader politician
- Political party: Neo Destour
- Children: Abderrahmane Tlili

Ahmed Tlili (أحمد التليلي) (16 October 1916 – 25 June 1967) was a Tunisian trades union leader and politician.

== Life ==
Ahmed Tlili was born into a family of struggling farmers at El Ksar, a town a little in the Gafsa mining region, slightly to the west of the precise centre of the French protectorate of Tunisia. He received his initial schooling locally and then moved to Tunis where he attended the prestigious Sadiki College. On completing his schooling he joined the postal service and returned to Gafsa in 1944. Here he worked with Farhat Hached on creating the "Union of Free Trades Unionists in the South" ("Union des syndicats libres du Sud") based in Sfax. His own particular priority was on looking after the interests of the mine workers.

He played a very important part in creating the Tunisian General Labour Union ("l'Union générale tunisienne du travail" / UGTT), elected a member of its administrative commission at its constitutional congress in January 1946. Tlilli is frequently identified as the instigator of the armes independence struggle in the Gafsa region but his role remained limited. He also supported the National Liberation Front in Algeria and other liberation movements in Africa. Accused of participation in the "Stah operation" Tlili was arrested on 13 February 1952: he was released in July 1954.

After independence he became a member (and treasurer) of the Politburo of the Neo Destour (political party) between 1954 and 1963. He was also, between 1956 and 1963, secretary general of the UGTT. He succeeded in gaining access and influence in the International Confederation of Free Trade Unions (ICFTU), and played a decisive role in creating its African regional organisation. He was also behind the establishment of several co-operative operations which enabled the UGTT to finance the means to consolidate its autonomy and strengthen its role in Tunisian society.

Tlili also took courageous positions in support of democratisation and human rights. In 1958 began to distance himself publicly from the president, criticising his autocratic methods and, notably, refusing to subordinate the UGTT to the country's ruling party. In July 1965 he slipped out of Tunisia and headed for Europe where he made statements that were hostile to the Bourguiba régime. In January 1966, a year before he died, he published a powerful indictment of the government under the title "Letter to Bourgiba" ("Lettre à Bourguiba") which displeased the authorities. On 18 November 1966 the Chamber of Deputies (national parliament) endorsed the withdrawal of his seat in the assembly and he was forced into a European exile.

He nevertheless returned to Tunis on 25 March 1967. His health declined rapidly and three months later, on 25 June 1967, he died in Paris. His body was repatriated and buried in Tunis at the Jellaz Cemetery, in the corner reserved for those who had taken a lead in creating an independent Tunisia.

== Personal ==
Abderrahmane Tlili, the son of Ahmed Tlili, also became involved in Tunisian politics. He was noted for his opposition to the régime of Zine El Abidine Ben Ali.

== Celebration ==
The 42nd anniversary of his death was marked by a contemplative ceremony attended by fr:Abdessalem JeradAbdessalem Jerad secreatary general of the UGTT, along with members of the union's executive committee, other union officials and members, and members of his family. Four years later the centenary of his birth was commemorated with the issuance of a special postage stamp.
