= Gafsa (disambiguation) =

Gafsa may refer to:

- Gafsa, a city in Tunisia
- Gafsa (wasp), a wasp genus in the family Encyrtidae
- Gafsa Governorate, a governate of tunisia
