= Chebika, Kairouan =

Coordinates: 35.618651°N 9.925976°E

Chebika الشبيكة
- Town
- Interactive map of Chebika
- Country: Tunisia
- Governorate: Kairouan Governorate

Population (2014)
  - Total: 2,933
- Time zone: UTC+1 (CET)

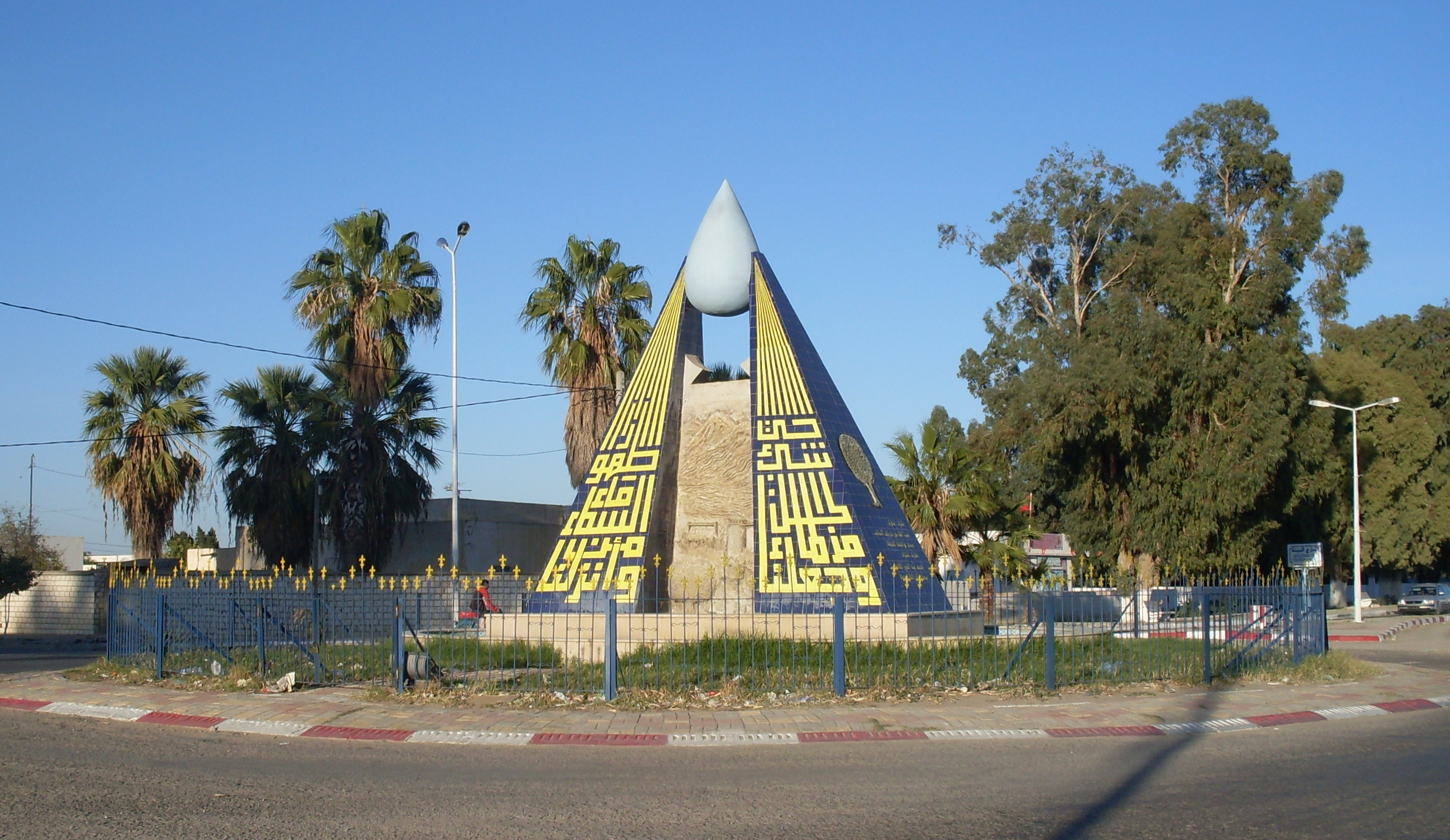
Entrance of the city of Chebika to the vicinity of Kairouan

Chebika, Kairouan is a town in the Kairouan Governorate, Tunisia.

== See also ==
- List of cities in Tunisia
