= Djebel Bouramli =

Mountain in Tunisia

Coordinates: 34°29′30″N 8°32′36″E

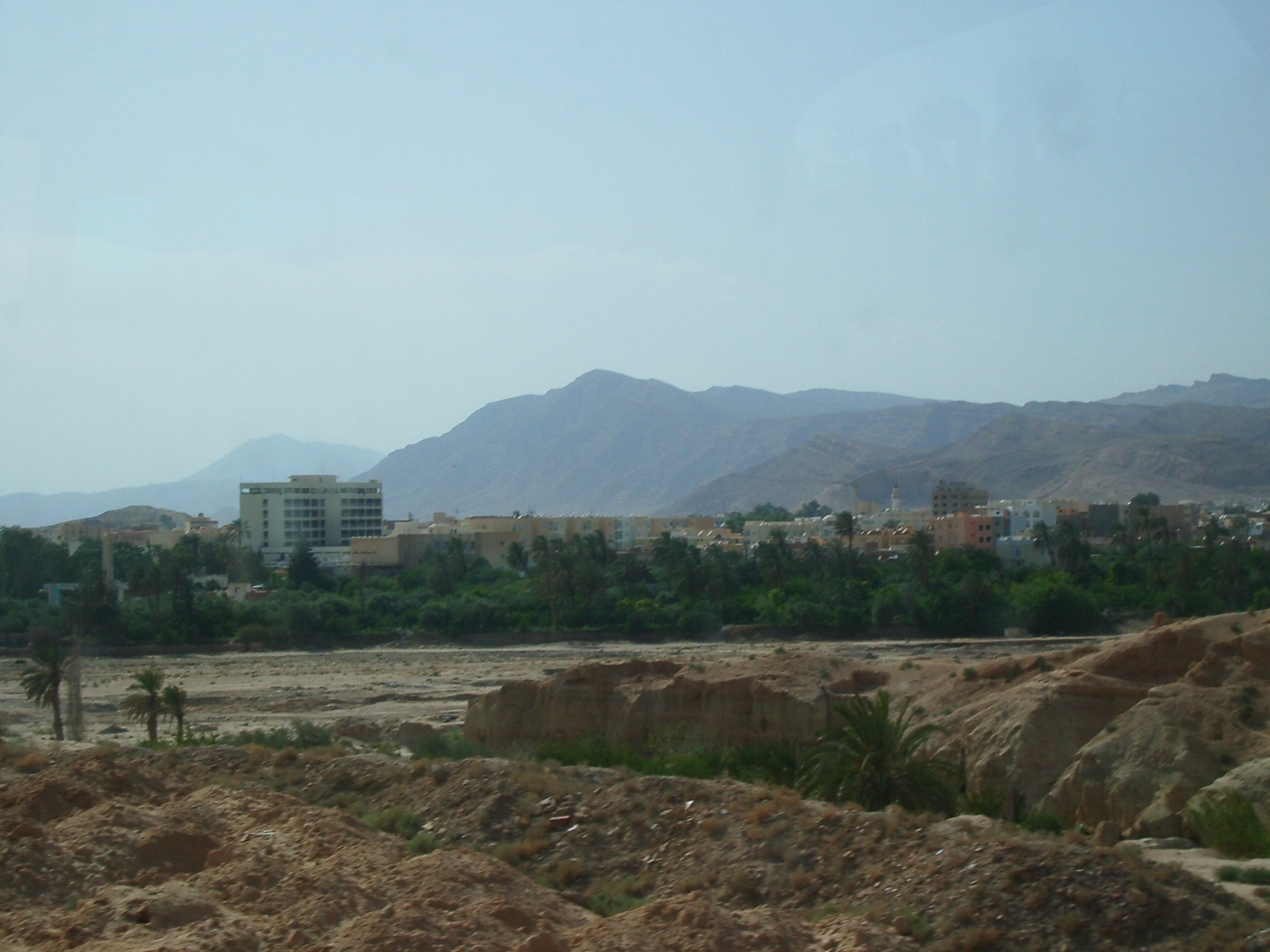
View of Djebel Bouramli

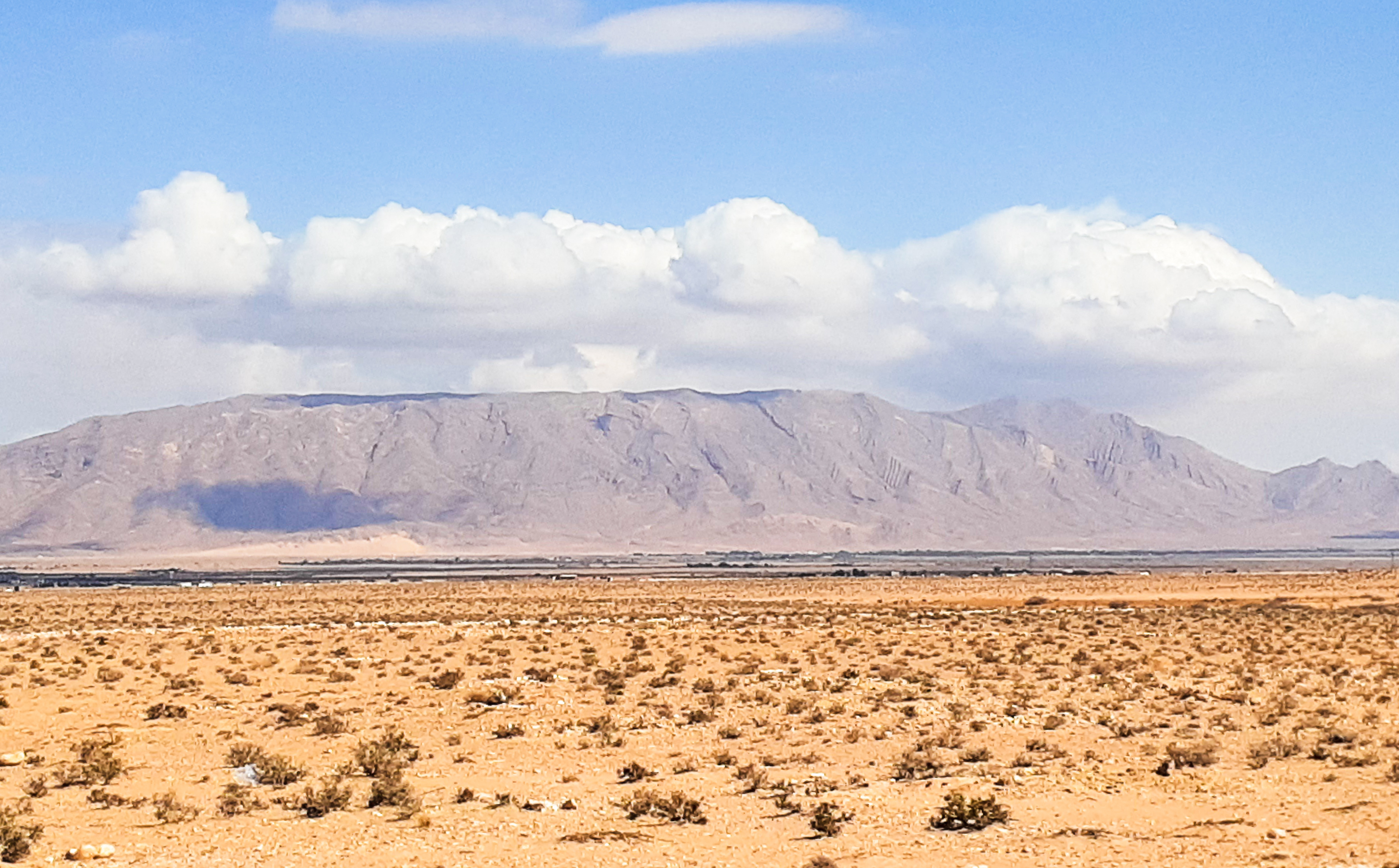

Djebel Bouramli is a mountain located in the governorate of Gafsa, in the south-west of Tunisia.

It is in the center of a natural reserve created in 1993 and covers an area of 50 hectares.
