= Mdhila =

- Commune and town
- Location within Tunisia
- Coordinates: 34.25°N 8.75°E
- Country: Tunisia
- Governorate: Gafsa Governorate
- Delegation(s): Mdhila

Government
  - Mayor: Hafedh Henchiri (Nidaa Tounes)

Population (2014)
  - Total: 12,814
- Time zone: UTC+1 (CET)

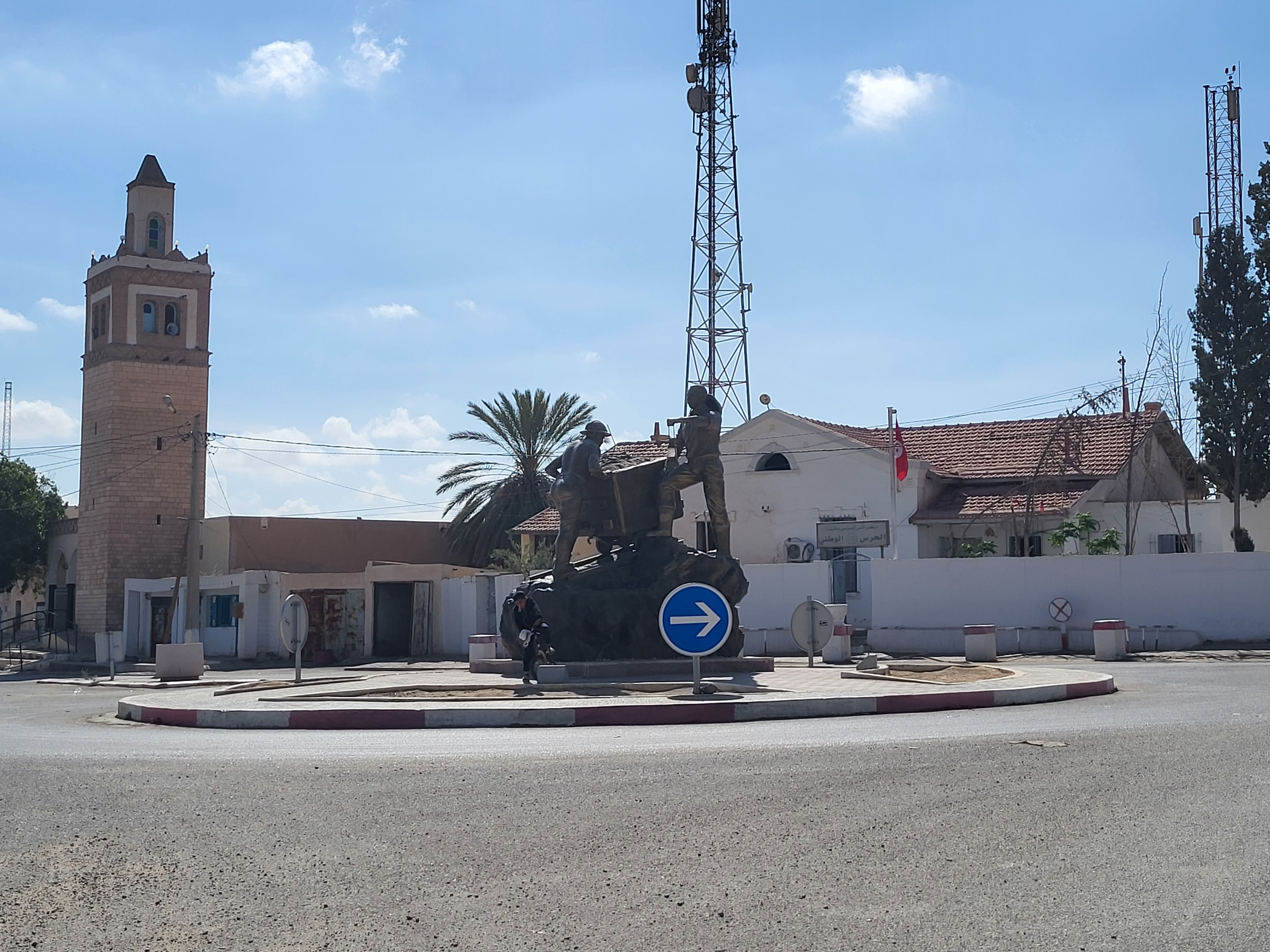
Al-Filaj Al-Mdhila Intersection

Mdhila (Arabic: المضيلة Al Maḏīla) is a town in the Gafsa Governorate, Tunisia. It constitutes a municipality with 12814 inhabitants in 2014.

== Population ==
2014 Census (Municipal)
Homes	Families	Males	Females	Total
2922	2739	6532	6282	12814

== See also ==
- List of cities in Tunisia
