= Aïn Djeloula =

- Commune and town
- Location in Tunisia
- Coordinates: 35°48′N 9°47′E
- Country: Tunisia
- Governorate: Kairouan Governorate

Population (2014)
  - Total: 1,757
- Time zone: UTC1 (CET)

Aïn Djeloula is a small town and commune in the Kairouan Governorate of central Tunisia, situated 30 kilometers west of Kairouan and the eastern mountains of Jebel Ousselat. In 2004 it had a population of 1,651.

The surroundings contain numerous caves housing prehistoric remains.

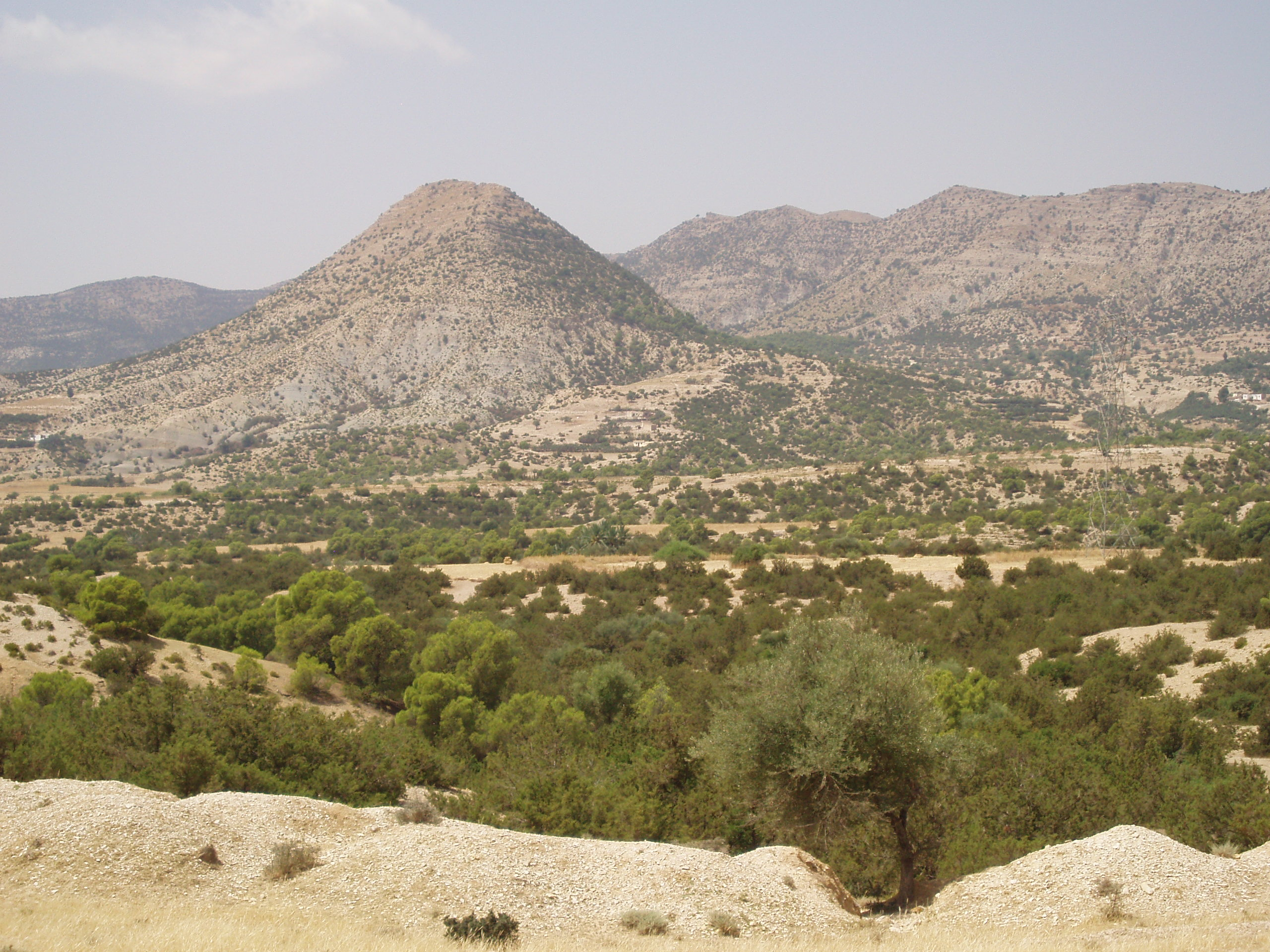
Mount Ousselat
