= Echrarda =

Coordinates: 35°07′08″N 10°01′49″E

Echrarda ⴻⵛⵔⴰⵔⴷⴰ Chrarda
- Commune and town
- Interactive map of Echrarda
- Country: Tunisia
- Governorate: Kairouan Governorate

Population (2014)
  - Total: 1,721
- Time zone: UTC+1 (CET)

Echrarda is a town and commune in the Kairouan Governorate, Tunisia. As of 2014 it had a population of 1,721. The town has a singular hospital, high school, middle school, and library. It also has a lawyers office which specializes in property disputes. The town has no court with the nearest one being in Nasr Allah. The town's main source of income is agriculture with the main crop being grown being Olives and their byproducts such as olive oil. The town of Echrarda is the capital and largest city within the Commune of Echerada. The Commune is within the Kairouan Governorate in the center of Tunisia. It also borders the Sidi Bouzid Governorate. The majority of the Commune is rural area except for the town of Echrada. The town has the famous "seventy-four" corner which is 74 kilometers from Kairouan, Sidi Bouzid and Sfax respectively.

== Population ==
2014 Census (Municipal)
Homes	Families	Males	Females	Total
663	452	825	880	1705

== See also ==
- List of cities in Tunisia
