= Fériana =

Fériana فريانة
- Commune and town
- Interactive map of Fériana
- Coordinates: 34°57′00″N 8°34′00″E
- Country: Tunisia
- Governorate: Kasserine Governorate

Population (2014)
  - Total: 75,000
  - Ethnicities: Arab
  - Religions: Islam
- Time zone: UTC+1 (CET)
- Postal code: 1240

Fériana (Arabic: فريانة) is a town and commune in the Kasserine Governorate, Tunisia. As of 2004 it had a population of 26,504. It is 35 km from Kasserine and 75 from Gafsa.

Located in the southern part of the Tunisian ridge, at 745 meters of altitude, it is one of the highest cities of Tunisia. It has a semi-arid climate in cool winter and receives about 350 millimeters of rain per year. Vegetation is scarce except a few steppes of alfa (spartum lygum) and vestiges of an Aleppo pine forest.

Each year in August, the town hosts a festival celebrating the culture of the Ouled Sidi Tlil tribe, particularly its cavalry.

== Population ==
2014 Census (Municipal)
Homes	Families	Males	Females	Total
8281	7849	18131	18373	36504

== See also ==
- List of cities in Tunisia
