= Nasrallah, Tunisia =

Coordinates: 35°21′00″N 9°49′12″E

- Commune and town
- Interactive map of Nasrallah, Tunisia
- Country: Tunisia
- Governorate: Kairouan Governorate

Government
  - Mayor: Hedi Mahfoudh (Popular Front)

Population (2014)
  - Total: 8,930
- Time zone: UTC+1 (CET)

Nasrallah, Tunisia (Arabic: نصرالله), is a town and commune in the Kairouan Governorate, Tunisia. As of 2004 it had a population of 5,054.

== See also ==
- List of cities in Tunisia
