= Floods in Tunisia =

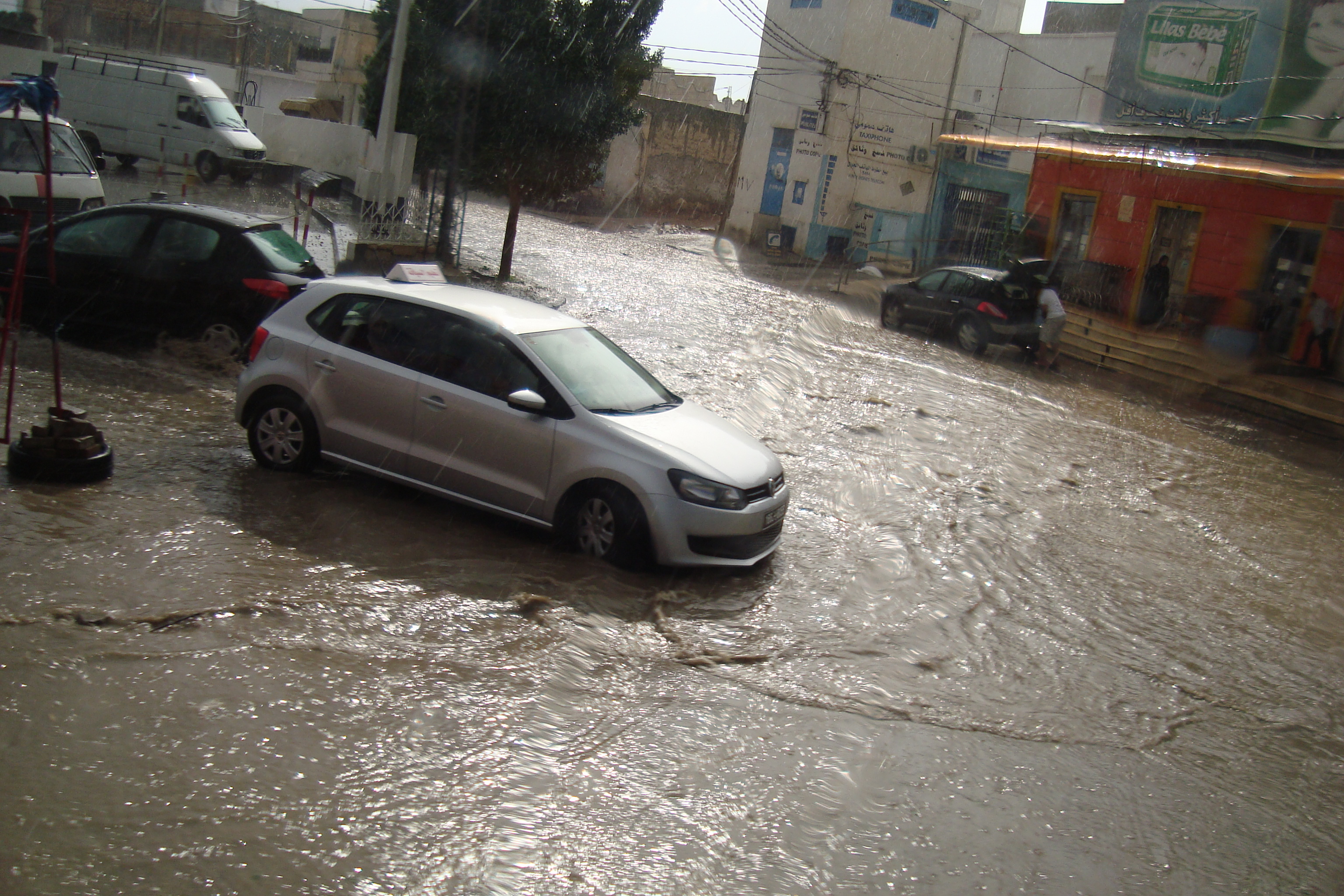
Severe urban flooding in Tunisia after heavy rainfall

Flooding in Tunisia occurs primarily due to heavy rainfalls, particularly during the winter months, which leads to overflow in rivers and streams. Rivers like Oued Merguellil, Oued el Hadjar, and Oued el Hattab. According to data from Tunisia's National Institute of Meteorology significant rainfall events have occurred in the country. In March 2022, certain regions experienced rain accumulation of up to 120 mm over four days, exceeding twice the average monthly rainfall. Statistical analysis indicates that floods accounted for approximately 60% of total disaster-related economic losses in Tunisia from 1957 to 2018. During this period, over 560,000 individuals were affected by flood events.

== List of Floods ==
=== September 2020 Floods ===
- In September 2020, heavy rainfall caused flash floods in several Tunisian towns and cities, including Monastir, Sousse, Mahdia, and Tunis. Rainfall totals reached 47.8 mm in Monastir and 89 mm in Kairouan within a 24-hour period. Flooding in Tunis resulted in water depths exceeding one meter, causing road closures and building damage. According to the Tunisian Civil Protection Agency, the floods resulted in at least six fatalities, and over 40,000 individuals were affected, leading to displacement and property loss.
