= Foussana =

- Location in Tunisia
- Coordinates: 35°20′51″N 8°37′47″E
- Country: Tunisia
- Governorate: Kasserine Governorate

Area
  - City: 363.9 sq mi (942.4 km^{2})

Population (2014)
  - City: 41,447
  - Density: 113.9/sq mi (43.98/km^{2})
  - Urban: 7,716
  - Metro: 33,731
- Time zone: UTC1 (CET)
- Postal code: 1220
- Website: Foussana Official Website

Foussana (Arabic: فوسانة) is a town and commune in the Kasserine Governorate, Tunisia. As of 2004 it had a total population of 41249; in 5622 the urban area and 35627 in the rural. Foussana is located in the west of Kasserine Governorate, on the border with Algeria. The city was established on April 18, 1975.

== Population ==
2014 Census (Municipal)
Homes	Families	Males	Females	Total
1874	1666	3719	3984	7703

== See also ==
- List of cities in Tunisia
