= Oueslatia =

Coordinates: 35°50′24″N 9°34′48″E

Oueslatia الوسلاتية
- Commune and town
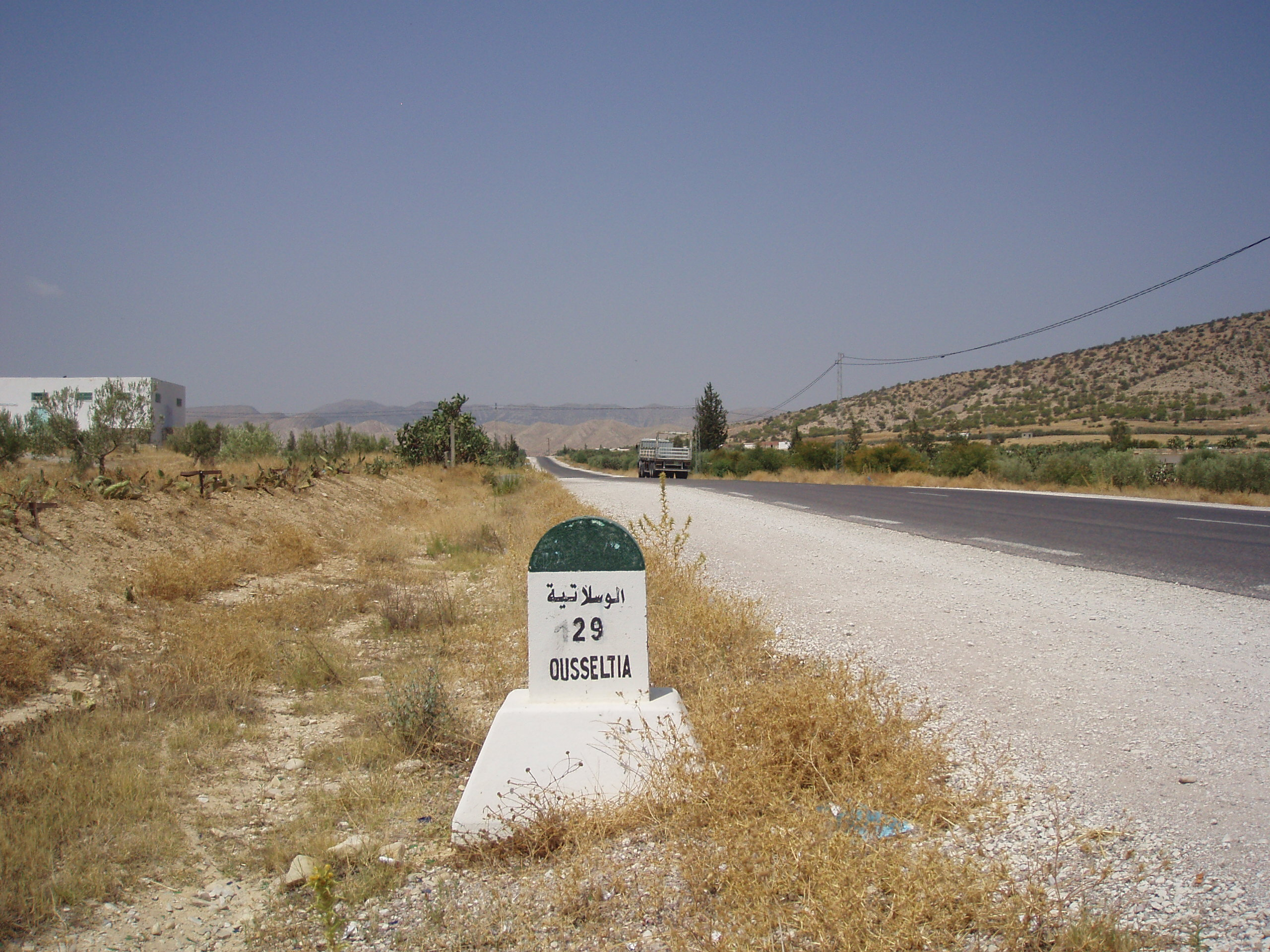
- Interactive map of Oueslatia
- Country: Tunisia
- Governorate: Kairouan Governorate

Government
  - Mayor: Karim Mlaiki (Nidaa Tounes)

Population (2014)
  - Total: 10,783
- Time zone: UTC+1 (CET)
- Website: www.commune-weslatia.gov.tn

Oueslatia is a town and commune in the Kairouan Governorate, Tunisia. As of 2004 it had a population of 8,444. It is also the capital of a delegation with 36,195 inhabitants in the 2006 census.

It is at the center of a plain between the mountainous alignments of Djebel Ousselat and Djebel Serj belonging to the southern flank of the Tunisian ridge.

In addition to the city, the villages of Maarouf, El Menzel, Djebel Serj, Zaghdoud, Djebel Ousselat, Djebel Erreihane, Ain Djeloula, Oum El Ksal and El Behaïer are attached to it.

There are caves with cave paintings of which the best preserved represent scenes of hunting rhinoceros, ostriches and buffalos.

Thirty kilometers from Oueslatia is the ancient site of Ksar Lemsa where the remains of a fortress of the Byzantine period and a Roman theater are preserved. A water source is used for the bottling of mineral water.

== Population ==
2014 Census (Municipal)
Homes	Families	Males	Females	Total
3178	2636	5174	5589	10763

== See also ==
- List of cities in Tunisia
