= El Ksar =

- Commune and town
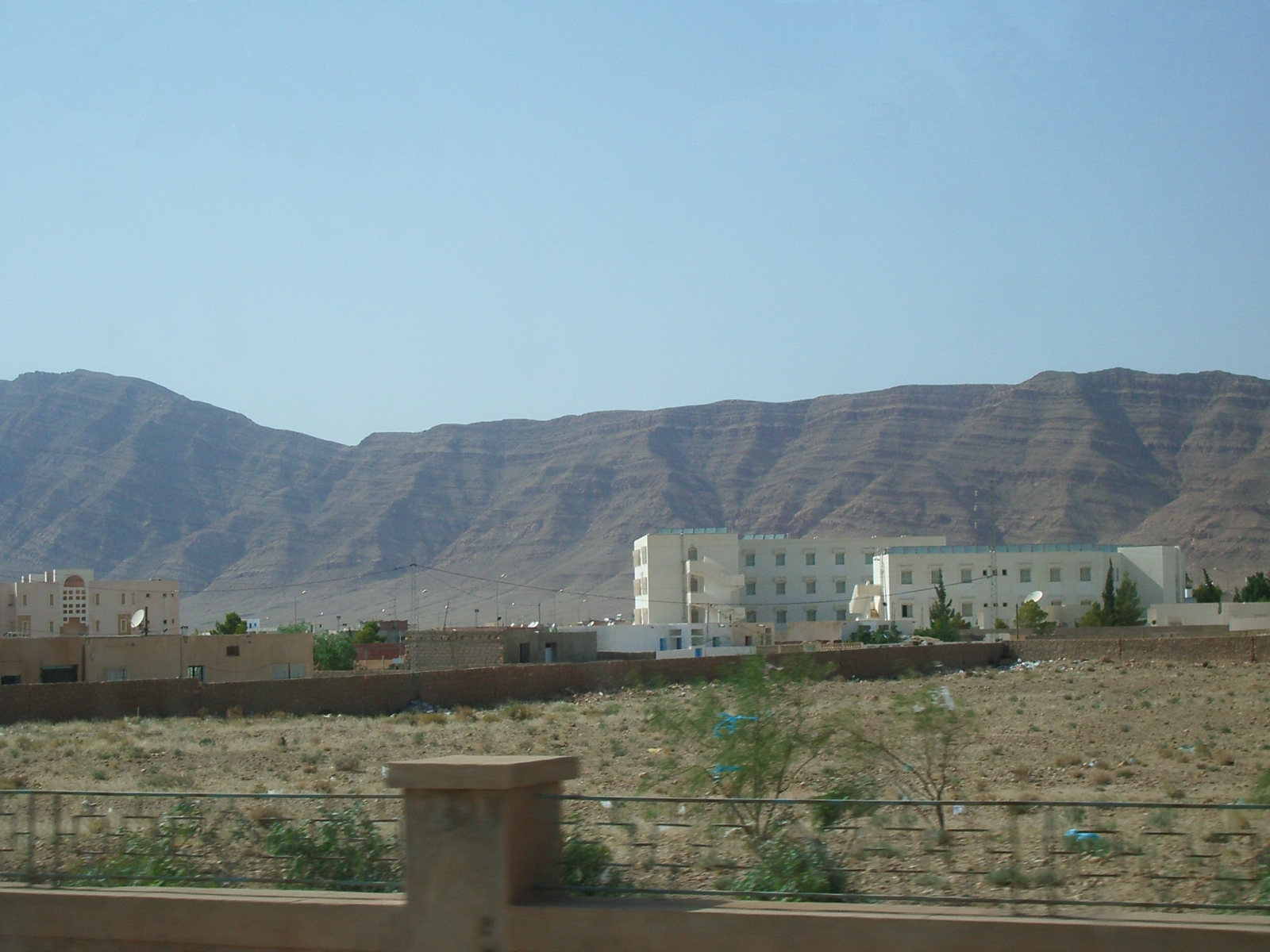

- Location within Tunisia
- Coordinates: 34.39°N 8.80°E
- Country: Tunisia
- Governorate: Gafsa Governorate

Population (2014)
  - Total: 33,729
- Time zone: UTC+1 (CET)

El Ksar (Arabic: القصر Al Qaṣr) is a town and commune in the Gafsa Governorate, Tunisia. As of 2004 it had a population of 29,617.

== Population ==
2014 Census (Municipal)
Homes	Families	Males	Females	Total
9061	8379	16432	17297	33729

== See also ==
- List of cities in Tunisia
