= Bou Hajla =

Coordinates: 35°12′21″N 10°07′29″E

Bou Hajla بوحجلة sidi umar bou hajla
- Commune and town
- Interactive map of Bou Hajla
- Country: Tunisia
- Governorate: Kairouan Governorate

Population (2014)
  - Total: 7,940
- Time zone: UTC+1 (CET)

Bou Hajla is a town and commune in the Kairouan Governorate, Tunisia. As of 2004 it had a population of 6,002.

== Culture ==
The Sidi Amor Bou Hajla Festival is the result of the combining together two events. In the late 1960s, the local authorities of the municipality and the delegation decided to organize a traditional equestrian performance alongside the religious processions honoring Sidi Amor Bou Hajla, a sufi patron. The move intended to allow people from the more remote rural areas to participate in both festivities with a single journey. Through the festival, the local community initially presents itself through its most prominent landmarks: the tomb of the patron and the space for the horse riders located behind the livestock market. Over time, both the venues of the festival and the symbols chosen by the organizers to represent the local society have evolved.

In 2008, the city established an annual theater festival under the name Theatrical Days of Sidi Amor Bou Hajla.

In 2013, the city hosted the inaugural edition of the National Anthropological Film Festival, which took place from September 12 to 14, organized by the city's Cultural Center.

== Economy ==
The town lacks previous industrial developments and has a higher-than-average unemployment rate.

In 2011, reports revealed potential reserves of oil in Bou Hajla and nearby areas. Exploration license was granted to Canadian oil company DualEx Energy. At the time, the company estimated the area, within three locations, to hold over 1 billion barrels of oil. In 2016, the company ceased its operations and surrendered the license.

== See also ==
- List of cities in Tunisia
