= ISO 3166-2:TN =

Entry for Tunisia in ISO 3166-2

ISO 3166-2:TN is the entry for Tunisia in ISO 3166-2, part of the ISO 3166 standard published by the International Organization for Standardization (ISO), which defines codes for the names of the principal subdivisions (e.g., provinces or states) of all countries coded in ISO 3166-1.

Currently for Tunisia, ISO 3166-2 codes are defined for 24 governorates.

Each code consists of two parts, separated by a hyphen. The first part is TN, the ISO 3166-1 alpha-2 code of Tunisia. The second part is two digits.

== Current codes ==
Subdivision names are listed as in the ISO 3166-2 standard published by the ISO 3166 Maintenance Agency (ISO 3166/MA).

Click on the button in the header to sort each column.

Code	Subdivision name (ar) (conventional names)	Subdivision name (ar) (Note: For reference only, Arabic name in Arabic script not included in the ISO 3166-2 standard.)
TN-31	Béja	باجة
TN-13	Ben Arous	بن عروس
TN-23	Bizerte	بنزرت
TN-81	Gabès	ڨابس
TN-71	Gafsa	ڨفصة
TN-32	Jendouba	جندوبة
TN-41	Kairouan	قيروان
TN-42	Kasserine	ڨصرين
TN-73	Kébili	ڨبلي
TN-12	L'Ariana	أريانة
TN-14	La Manouba	منوبة
TN-33	Le Kef	الكاف
TN-53	Mahdia	المهدية
TN-82	Médenine	مدنين
TN-52	Monastir	المنستير
TN-21	Nabeul	نابل
TN-61	Sfax	صفاقس
TN-43	Sidi Bouzid	سيدي بوزيد
TN-34	Siliana	سليانة
TN-51	Sousse	سوسة
TN-83	Tataouine	تطاوين
TN-72	Tozeur	توزر
TN-11	Tunis	تونس
TN-22	Zaghouan	زغوان

== Changes ==
The following changes to the entry have been announced in newsletters by the ISO 3166/MA since the first publication of ISO 3166-2 in 1998:

Newsletter	Date issued	Description of change in newsletter	Code/Subdivision change
Newsletter I-5	2003-09-05	Addition of one new governorate. List source updated. Code source updated	Subdivisions added: TN-14 Manouba
Newsletter I-6	2004-03-08	Adjustment of name form in TN-14. List source updated	
Newsletter II-3	2011-12-13 (corrected 2011-12-15)	Toponym evolution, alphabetical re-ordering and source list update.	

== See also ==
- Subdivisions of Tunisia
- FIPS region codes of Tunisia
- Neighbouring countries: DZ, LY
