= Alaâ, Tunisia =

Alaâ العلا
- Commune and village
- Location in Tunisia Alaâ (Africa)
- Country: Tunisia
- Governorate: Kairouan Governorate

Population (2014)
  - Total: 3,307
- Time zone: UTC1 (CET)

Alaâ is a village and commune located in the Kairouan Governorate, Tunisia. The population was 2,657 in 2004.

== See also ==
- List of cities in Tunisia
