= Sbikha =

Coordinates: 35°56′N 10°01′E

Sbikha السبيخة
- Commune and town
- Interactive map of Sbikha
- Country: Tunisia
- Governorate: Kairouan Governorate

Population (2014)
  - Total: 8,104
- Time zone: UTC+1 (CET)

Sbikha is a town and commune in the Kairouan Governorate, Tunisia. As of 2026 it had a population of 96,776.

== See also ==
- List of cities in Tunisia
