= Aïn Chrichira =

Nature reserve in Tunisia

Coordinates: 35.628546°N 9.832146°E

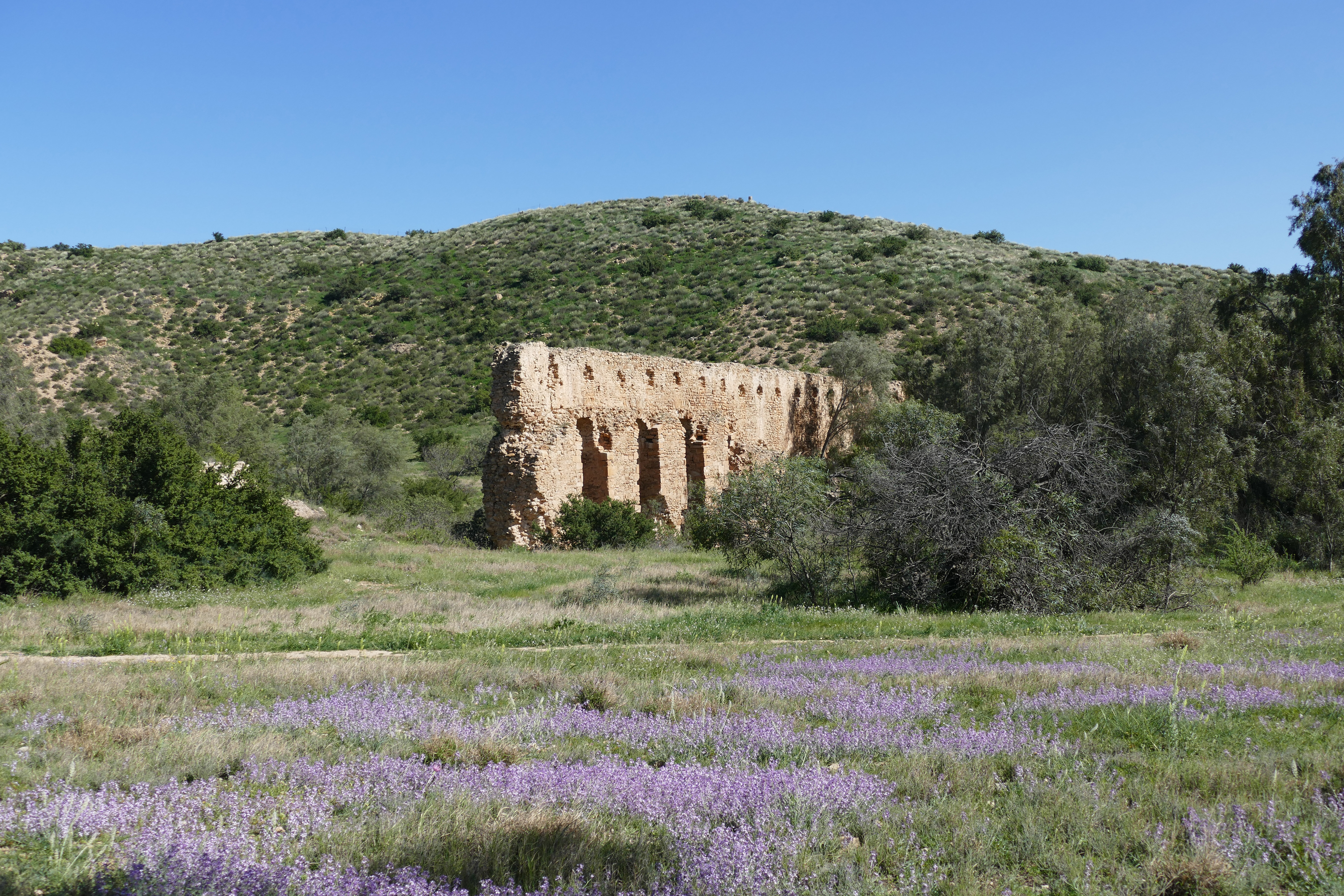
Aïn Chrichira.

Aïn Chrichira (Arabic: عين شريشيرة) is a natural site located in the governorate of Kairouan, in the center of Tunisia, covering an area of 122 hectares. It is classified as a nature reserve since 1993.

== Geological formations ==
The geological formations of the site date from the Tertiary (Paleogene and Neogene on the south of the ridge with nummulite and dolomitic limestones of the ypresian and the Lutetian lower, as well as the clay-brown Flysch of the Aquitanian Oligocene.
