= Djebel Serj =

Mountain in Tunisia

Coordinates: 35.9367°N 9.5497°E

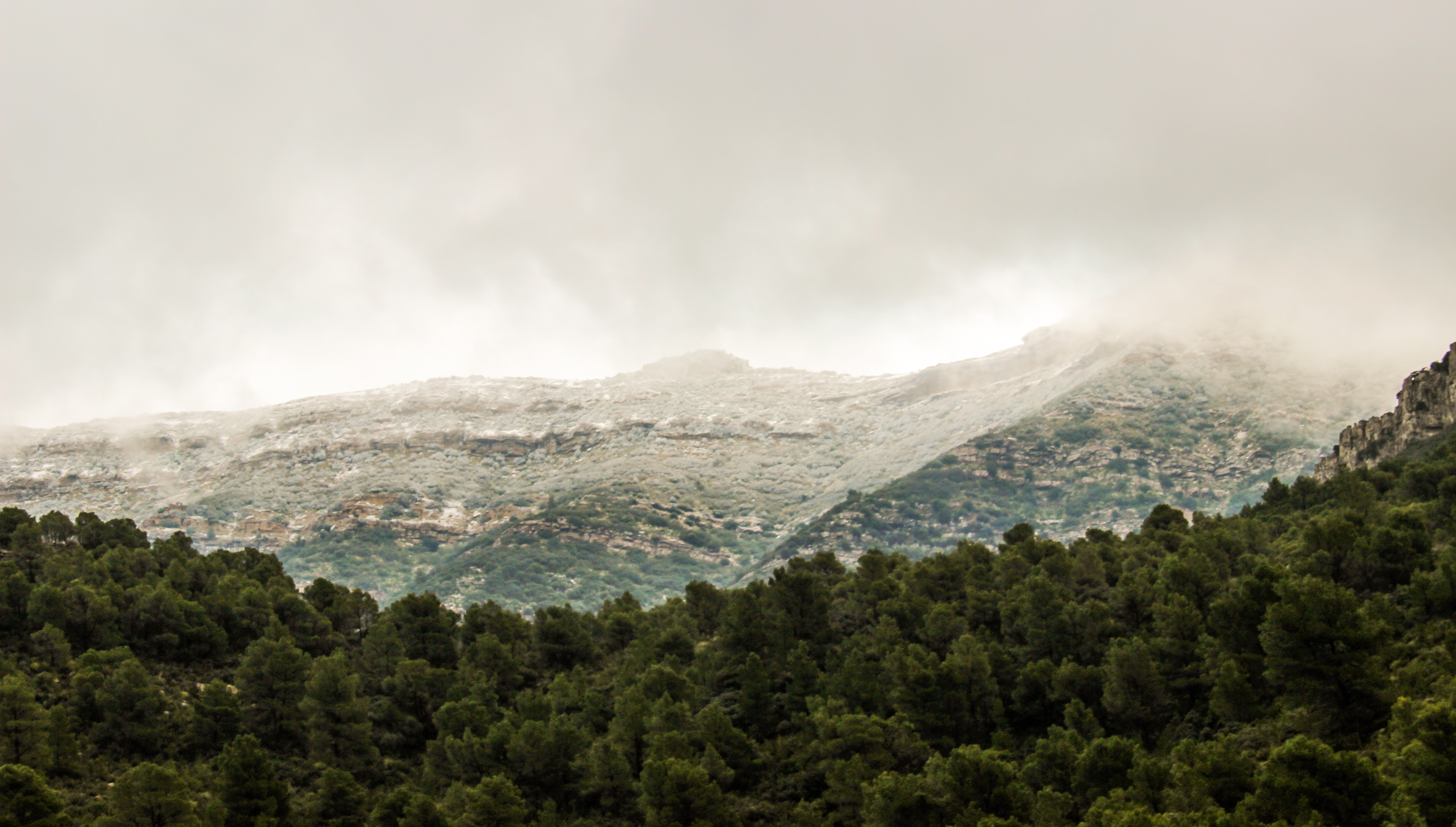
View of Djebel Serj

The Djebel Serj (جبل السرج) is a limestone mountain located in the center of Tunisia, within the Tunisian ridge. It rises to 1,357 meters above sea level. The mountain is located at 35° 56′ 12″n, 9° 32′ 59″e

== Location ==
Djebel Serj is located twenty kilometers southeast of Siliana and sixty kilometers north-west of Kairouan, in the middle of the ridge, halfway between Grombalia and djebel Tamsmida. It is about five kilometers wide and twenty kilometers long.

Its northern slope represents the watershed of the main wadis that feed the Lakhmess dam.

== Name ==
The origin of the appellation serj would come from the peculiar shape of a mountain ridge which approaches the shape of a saddle (Arabic: سرج). This rapprochement has fed many legends and myths around the formation of this singularity among the neighboring populations of the jebel.

== Description ==
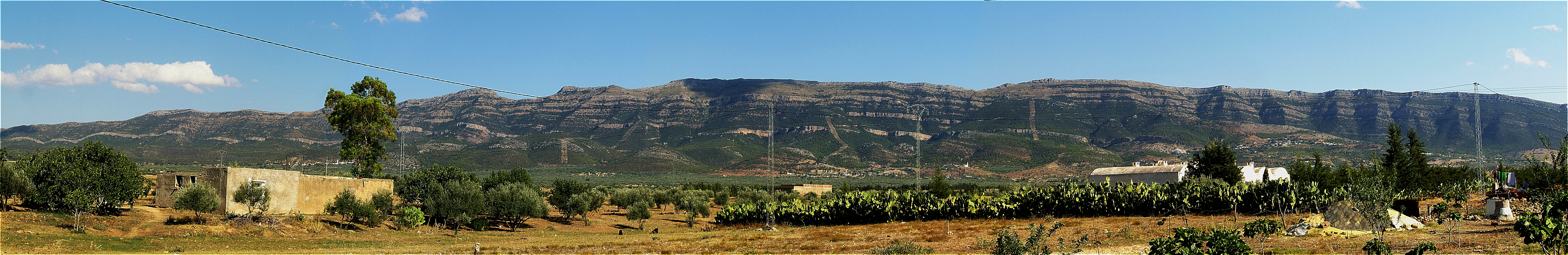
Djebel Serj panorama.

The mountain is in the Jebel Serj National Park.

This mountain is considered a special place for speleology in Tunisia due to the Ain Dhab and Mine caves being in the mountain.

The mountain has been protected within the Jebel Serj national park since the decree of March 29, 2010. This one has an area of 17.2 km2

== Recent history ==
In November 2015, a raid operation was carried out at the Jebel Serj in the context of the fight against terrorism, without, however, leading to an arrest. A similar operation in January 2016 led to the death of an alleged terrorist.

The mountain is also affected by several fires in July 2016 in different areas.
