= Haffouz =

Coordinates: 35°38′N 9°41′E

Haffouz حفوز
- Commune and town
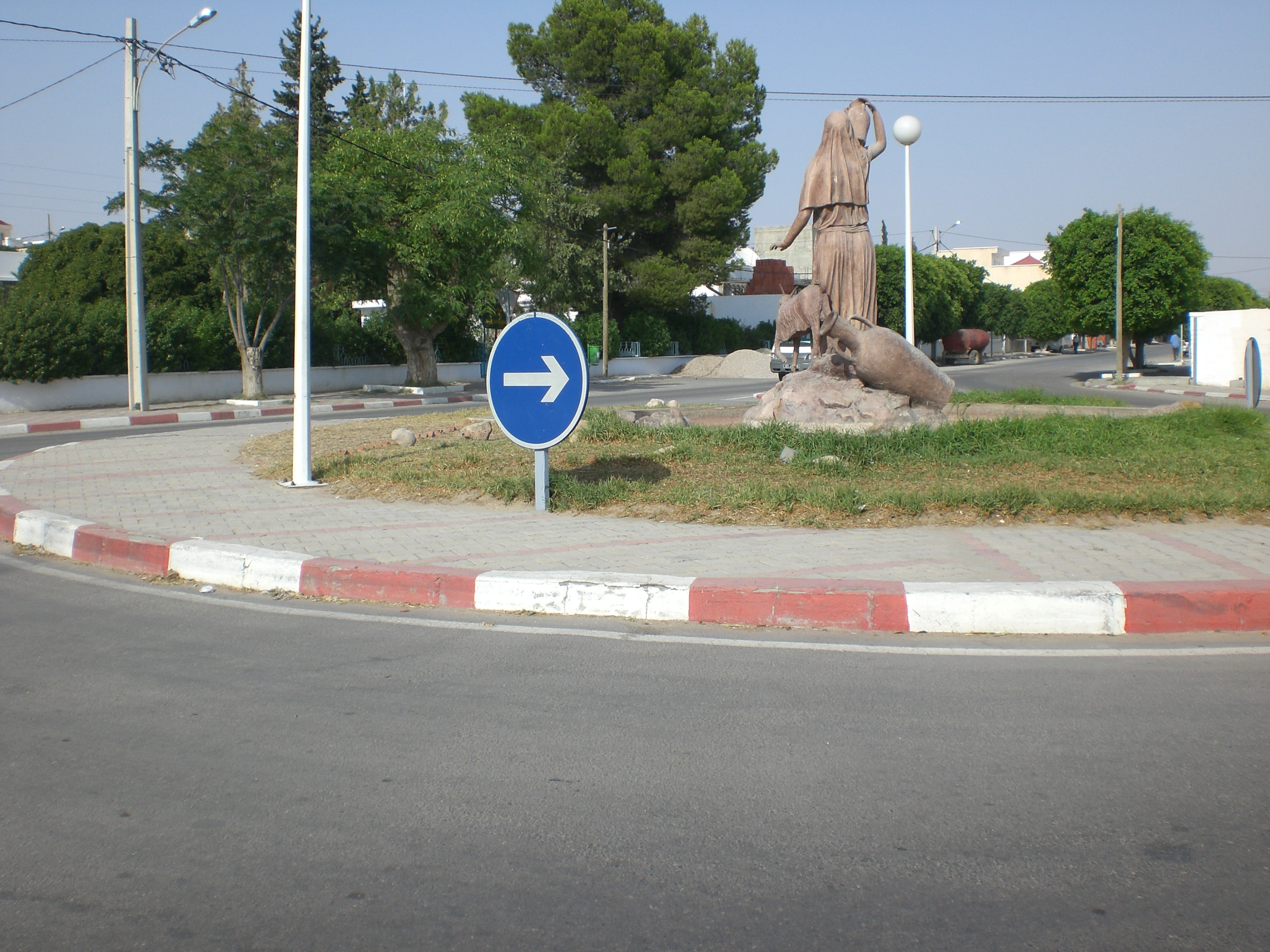
- Interactive map of Haffouz
- Country: Tunisia
- Governorate: Kairouan Governorate

Population (2014)
  - Total: 8,472
- Time zone: UTC+1 (CET)

Haffouz is a town and commune in the Kairouan Governorate, Tunisia. As of 2004 it had a population of 8,225.

== Population ==
2014 Census (Municipal)
Homes	Families	Males	Females	Total
2239	1920	4063	4366	8429

== See also ==
- List of cities in Tunisia
