= Caving in Tunisia =

Caving in Tunisia is a relatively rare sport in the country. Caving emerged in the late 1970s and includes a limited number of practitioners.

== Practice ==
The caving club of Bizerte began in 1979, in the youth house in the city. In 1981, a second club was opened in Zaghouan.

== Sites ==
=== Mine Cave ===
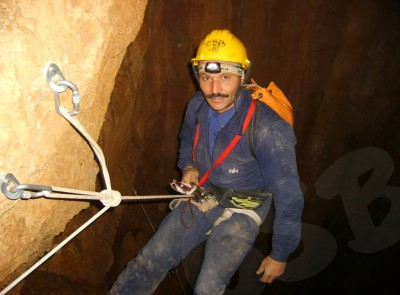
Caver descending in the Mine Cave

It is believed to be the longest cave in Tunisia. The two main caves are on the mountain ridges Jebel Serj and Jebel Bargou. They culminate respectively 1,309 and (m) 1,268 m and are oriented southwest and northeast. The first of these is composed of two parallel ridges separated by deep notch. All of the backbone is formed by Aptian land whose limestone's reef summit are almost all of outcrops. The sides of the djebel are pronounced, forming a safe fold structure.

There are sources emerging in wild vegetation and Roman ruins such as the bridge Sidi Amara.

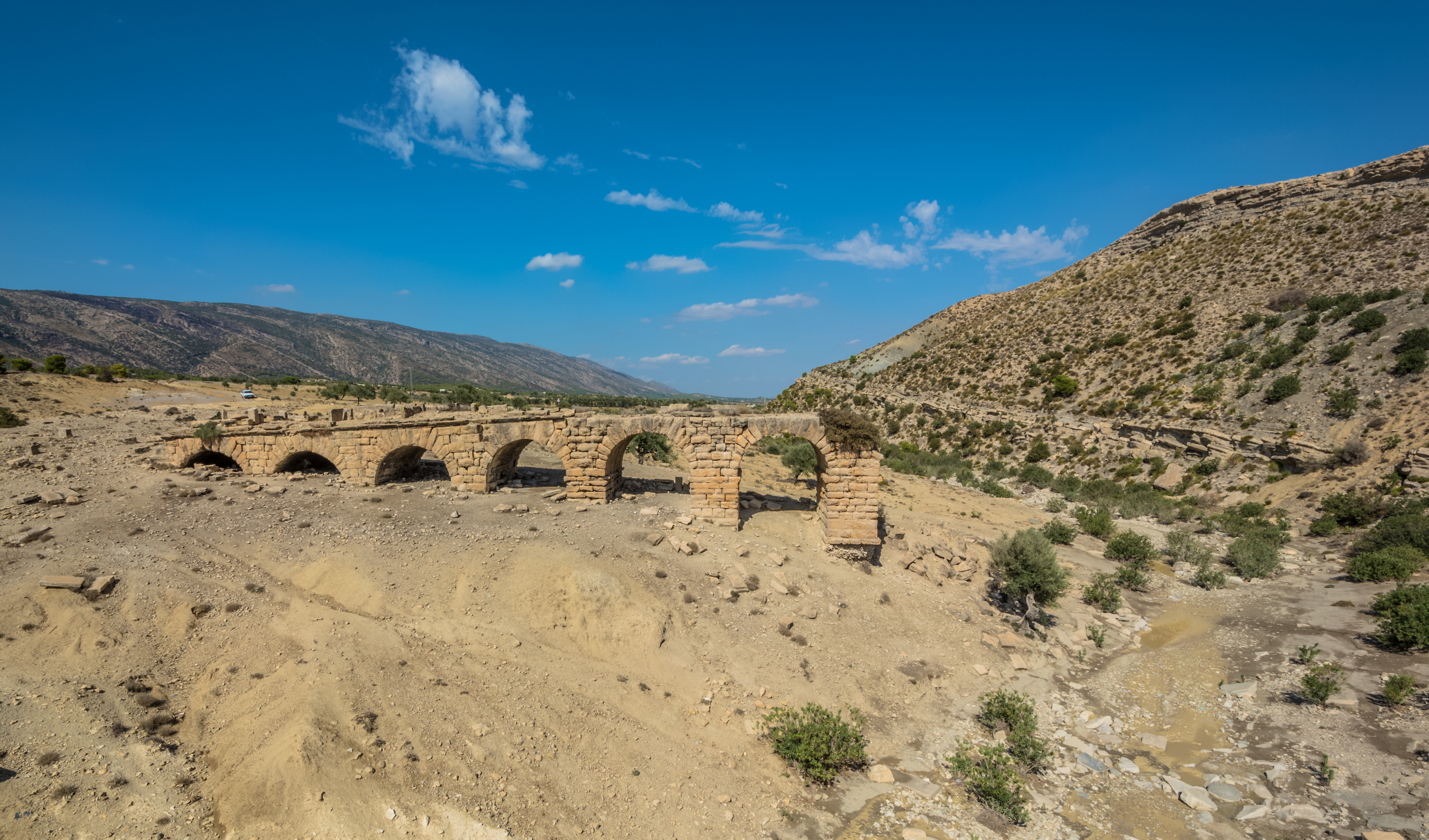
Roman bridge Sidi Amara

There are caves, the most important step is the cave of El Kef Biadh whose access is via a series of wells or galleries, most of which come from mining. The first large room of 1,608 m long and 267 metres deep shelters concretions and boulders; its walls are covered with bushes of Eccentric. The hall ends with a diaclases which opens on a well. It measures about 150 metres long and 50 metres wide. The vault is located some thirty metres above the ground.

It then goes to the second room that looks much like the previous one with the presence of concretions and basins . This last room is closed on a crack up to two metres above the ground. There is a colony of bats. The second room is over 200 meters long and 75 metres wide and has a vault located about forty metres above the ground in places.

=== Cave Nefza ===
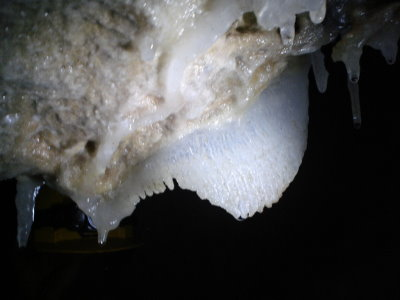
Draprerie

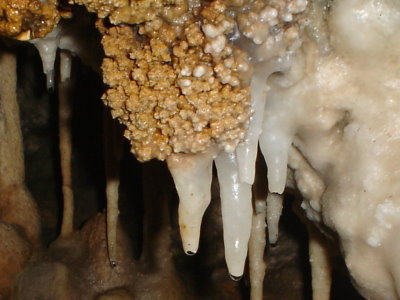
Stalactite

The cave Nefza is an extension of the mine Ghanguet Kef at Jebel El Damous which peaked at about 202 metres. The latter is formed by land dating from the Cretaceous, the Eocene, and the Oligocene. At these sites are deposits of zinc and lead.

The cavity, with a total length of 310 metres and a height of 60 metres, contains a tectonic accident: its cross section shows a general shape of a triangle with a straight wall western wall and a shaped Eastern staircase reversed. A gallery of thirty metres, covered in concentric circles and ovals, about eight metres above the ground, leads to a first room that leads to two lanes of forty metres in length, at different levels, leading to a large room in which there are two columns of stalagmites. A conduit leads to a third room containing concretions and eccentrics. At this level, progress is blocked by a narrow conduit.

=== Caves Joumine ===
The region of Joumine has land dating to the Triassic and Cretaceous. Access to the cave of El Blida is difficult: it is entered through a narrow conduit that leads to a very small room leading into the main room; the passage between these two rooms is made through a slope of approximately 20°.

Access to the cave of Bou Touil is the entrance is from a fairly broad which leads to narrow corridors on the left side. It leads to a room with stalactites and stalagmites and columns. A large, steep (about 45 ° to 50 °) corridor in the back is ended by a narrow passage that stops the progression.

=== Cave Ichkeul ===
The Ichkeul cave is located in the Jebel Ichkeul, located about twenty kilometres from the city of Bizerte in the National Park Ichkeul covering an area of 12,600 hectares including a lake of 8,500 hectares. Limestone, dolomite, and marble rocks date from Triassic and Jurassic and are located above a collapsed ditch.

The cave itself has a narrow entrance allowing access to a room with cracks along the length of the walls and showing cavities. The room is followed by a narrow corridor formed by the wall and giant calcitic concretions, which ends with a stack of 32 metres. On the sides of the second room there are draperies, small stalactites and young stalagmites.
