= South East Tunisia =

South East Tunisia is the region in Tunisia which contains three of the country's governorates: Gabes, Medenine and Tataouine.

== Geography ==
The region has an arid climate with 99% of its area desert. It measures 62,767 kilometers square. The area makes more than a quarter of the total Tunisian territory with a population of 1,958,694 Million makes it the Second Populated region After the North East Tunisia.

== Economy ==
The economy of the south east is mainly based on commerce with neighboring country Libya, tourism (mainly the island of Djerba) and petrol industries in both Tataouine and Gabes. Due to the geographical nature of the area, agriculture is well known in Sfax Especially with olive and olive oil. The region remains quite impoverished and marginalized in comparison to the north and the coast.

== Culture ==
The south east of Tunisia has maintained an image of moderate conservatism unlike many other regions (North and coast) which have embraced a European-like lifestyle. Inhabitants of the south east have their unique accent, social norms and a distinctive folklore.
