= Kairouan Governorate =

Governorate of Tunisia

Kairouan قيروان
- Governorate
- Map of Tunisia with Kairouan highlighted

- Subdivisions of Kairouan Governorate
- Coordinates: 35°40′N 10°06′E
- Country: Tunisia
- Created: 21 June 1956
- Capital: Kairouan

Government
  - Governor: Dhaker Bargaoui (since 2024)

Area
  - Total: 6,712 km^{2} (2,592 sq mi)
  - Rank: Ranked 8th of 24

Population (2024)
  - Total: 600,803
  - Rank: Ranked 8th of 24
  - Density: 89.51/km^{2} (231.8/sq mi)
- Time zone: UTC+01 (CET)
- Postal prefix: xx
- ISO 3166 code: TN-41

Kairouan Governorate (Tunisian Arabic: ولاية قيروان Wilāyat Qiyrwān; French: Gouvernorat de Kairouan) is one of the twenty-four governorates of Tunisia. It is landlocked and in the centre-east of the country. It covers an area of 6,712 km^{2} and has a population of 600,803 (2024 census). The capital is Kairouan. Lowland parts of the province are semi-arid, experiencing in most years light rains in the winter months and scant rainfall in other months but higher parts attract relief precipitation in and around the Djebel Zhagdoud and a large part of the Djebel Serj national parks, in the north-east of the province which are geologically outcrops of the Dorsal Atlas mountains in the province to the north.

== Administrative divisions ==
The Kairouan Governorate is divided into eleven delegations (mutamadiyat), listed below with their populations at the 2004 and 2014 Censuses, and further sub-divided into sectors (imada).

Delegation	Area in km^{2}	Population 2004 Census	Population 2014 Census
Alaâ	361	31,773	28,991
Bou Hajla	690	70,589	72,371
Chebika	513	33,889	35,308
Echrarda	330	25,903	27,518
Haffouz	611	43,792	40,066
Hajeb El Ayoun	589	35,403	36,137
Kairouan North	251	83,794	96,781
Kairouan South	520	80,444	93,101
Nasrallah	685	37,112	33,789
Oueslatia	915	36,195	34,452
Sbikha	1,069	67,315	71,922

Twelve municipalities are included within Kairouan Governorate:

4111	Kairouan	172,788
4112	Chebika	21,799
4113	Sbikha	42,533
4114	Oueslatia	26,454
4115	Aïn Djeloula	6,441
4116	Haffouz	29,207
4117	El Alâa	28,897
4118	Hajeb El Ayoun	26,455
4119	Nasrallah	20,310
4120	Menzel Mehiri	12,680
4121	Echrarda	14,361
4122	Bou Hajla	71,836
	Raqqada	25,741
	Chraitia - Ksour	11,215
	Sisseb - Driaat	35,117
	Jehina	10,090
	Aïn El Beïdha	15,285
	Chaouachi	14,200
	Abida	15,394

== Nature reserves ==
- Aïn Chrichira

== Governors ==
A historical list of Governors of Bizerte Governorate since the independence in 1956:

- 1956–1964: Amor Chachia
- 1964: Mohsen Bel Aljia
- 1964–1969: Mongi Fekih
- 1969–1970: Amor Msadek
- 1970–1972: Slim Aloulou
- 1972–1978: Tahar Boussemma
- 1978–1979: Hédi Alaya
- 1979–1981: Béchir Lahmidi
- 1981–1982: Abdessalem Ben Ammar
- 1982–1984: Chédli Neffati
- 1984–1987: Khaled Guezmir
- 1987–1988: Rafik Belhaj Kacem
- 1988–1991: Kamel Haj Sassi
- 1991–1992: Salem Mekki
- 1992–1993: Noureddine Hafsi
- 1993–1994: Salah Jouini
- 1994–2000: Jamel Bouslimi
- 2000–2001: Habib Ben Gamra
- 2001–2004: Habib Aoual
- 2004–2007: Néjib Barkallah
- 2007–2011: Yassine Barbouche
- 2011–2011: Abdeljelil Ben Hassen
- 2011–2012: Mohamed Sahraoui
- 2012–2013: Abdelmajid Laghouen
- 2013–2014: Abdennaser Ellafi
- 2014–2015: Mohsen Mansouri
- 2015–2016: Chokri Belhassen
- 2016–2017: Taoufik Ouertani
- 2017–2019: Mounir Hamdi
- 2019–2023: Mohamed Bourguiba
- Since 2024: Dhaker Bargaoui
