= Gafsa Governorate =

Governorate of Tunisia

Gafsa ڨفصة
- Governorate
- Flag

- Map of Tunisia with Gafsa highlighted

- Subdivisions of Gafsa Governorate
- Coordinates: 34°25′N 8°47′E
- Country: Tunisia
- Created: 1956
- Capital: Gafsa

Government
  - Governor: Slim Frouja (since 2024)

Area
  - Total: 7,807 km^{2} (3,014 sq mi)
  - Rank: Ranked 5th of 24

Population (2019)
  - Total: 351,437
  - Rank: Ranked 17th of 24
  - Density: 45.02/km^{2} (116.6/sq mi)
- Time zone: UTC+01 (CET)
- Postal prefix: xx
- ISO 3166 code: TN-71

Gafsa Governorate (Tunisian Arabic: ولاية ڨفصة Wilāyat Gafṣa; French: Gouvernorat de Gafsa) is one of the 24 governorates of Tunisia. It is situated in central Tunisia, bordering Algeria. It covers an area of 7807 km^{2} and has a population of 337,331 (2014 census). The capital of the city is Gafsa. The governorate is considered a primarily mining region. Phosphate is the region's main resource, with 47 industrial enterprises located there.

== Geography ==
The governorate is located 355 kilometres (221 mi) from the capital and borders the governorates of Gabès, Sidi Bouzid, Kebili, Tozeur, and Kasserine.

The average temperature is 19.8 °C and annual rainfall is 48.9 millimeters.

Gafsa is a noted irrigated fruit-growing oasis and a major shipping center for phosphates obtained from the salt flats of Chott el Djerid.

== Administrative divisions ==
Administratively, the governorate is divided into eleven delegations (mutamadiyat), eight municipalities, nine rural councils, and 76 sectors (imadas). The delegations and their populations from the 2004 and 2014 censuses, are listed below:

Delegation	Population in 2004	Population in 2014
Belkhir	15,159	14,784
El Guetar	19,942	20,137
El Ksar	32,186	36,482
Gafsa Nord	9,407	10,022
Gafsa Sud	90,742	100,148
Mdhilla	14,841	15,306
Metlaoui	38,938	38,634
Oum El Araies	31,733	27,012
Redeyef	27,940	26,976
Sidi Aïch	8,297	10,084
Sned	34,524	36,746

The following eight municipalities are located in Gafsa Governorate:

6111	Gafsa	129,931
6112	El Ksar	23,806
6113	Moularès (Oum El Araies)	31,767
6114	Redeyef	31,421
6115	Métlaoui	44,547
6116	Mdhila	16,883
6117	El Guettar	20,784
6118	Sened	23,633
	Belkhir	15,923
	Lalla	16,125
	Sidi Aïch	12,029
	Sidi Boubaker	5,402
	Zannouch	16,525
	[[Other (if aggregated)] ]	N/A
