= Kasserine Governorate =

Governorate of Tunisia

Kasserine ڨصرين
- Governorate
- Map of Tunisia with Kasserine highlighted

- Divisions of Kasserine Governorate
- Coordinates: 35°10′N 8°50′E
- Country: Tunisia
- Created: 21 June 1956
- Capital: Kasserine

Government
  - Governor: Zied Trabelsi (since 2024)

Area
  - Total: 8,260 km^{2} (3,190 sq mi)
  - Rank: Ranked 4th of 24

Population (2024)
  - Total: 492,741
  - Rank: Ranked 11th of 24
  - Density: 59.7/km^{2} (155/sq mi)
- Time zone: UTC+01 (CET)
- Postal prefix: 1200
- +216: 77
- ISO 3166 code: TN-42
- Unemployment Rate: 22%
- As of: 2019

Kasserine Governorate (Arabic: ولاية الڨصرين Wilāyat al-Gaṣrīn pronounced [ɡasˤˈriːn]; French: Gouvernorat de Kasserine), sometimes spelt Casrein, is one of the twenty-four governorates (provinces) of Tunisia. It is in west-central Tunisia on the frontier with Algeria, wholly north of the true centre line but the area is south or west of the bulk of the population of the country, based on Tunisia's greater northern rainfall. It covers an area of 8,260 km^{2} and has a population of 492,741 (2024) .The capital is Kasserine which is at the foot of Jebel ech Chambi, Tunisia's highest mountain, in turn part of the Dorsal Atlas mountains. The mountain and its associated escarpment form its own national park in the province. The governorate is known for its archaeological wealth and has 102 monuments listed by the National Heritage Institute. At the same time, it is also noted for the marginalization it has suffered at the hands of various governments: in 2012, it recorded the lowest knowledge index (0.03), the lowest wealth and employment index (0.21), the lowest justice and equity index (0.32), and ranked last among governorates according to the regional development indicator (0.16).

== Main sights ==
In Kasserine Governorate exist two of the most famous Roman sites in Tunisia, which are Sbeitla and Haidra. The Triumphal Arch of the Tetrarchy at the entrance to Sbeitla commemorates the four emperors that governed the empire in the year 300, just before the rule of Constantine I.

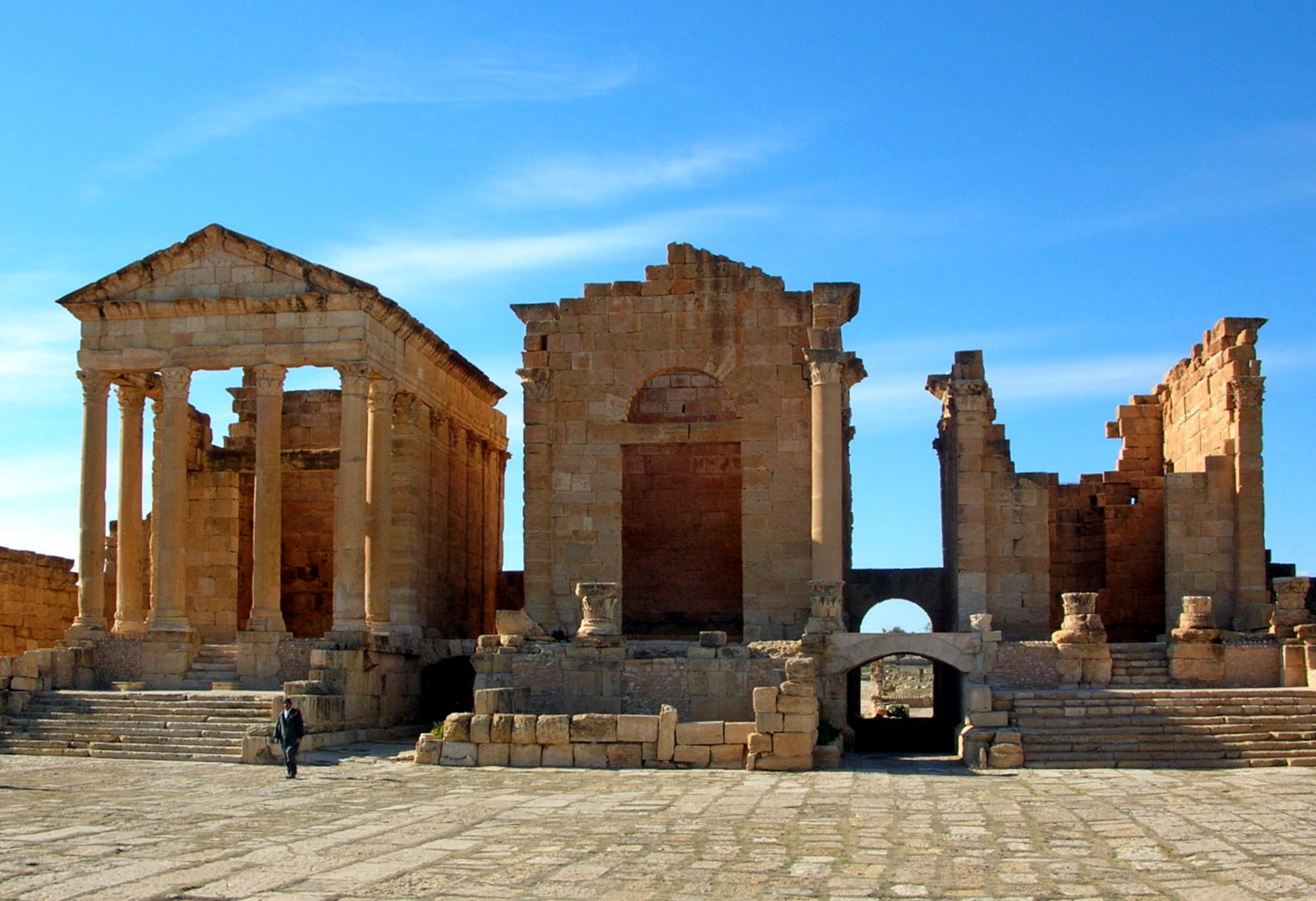
Capitoline temples

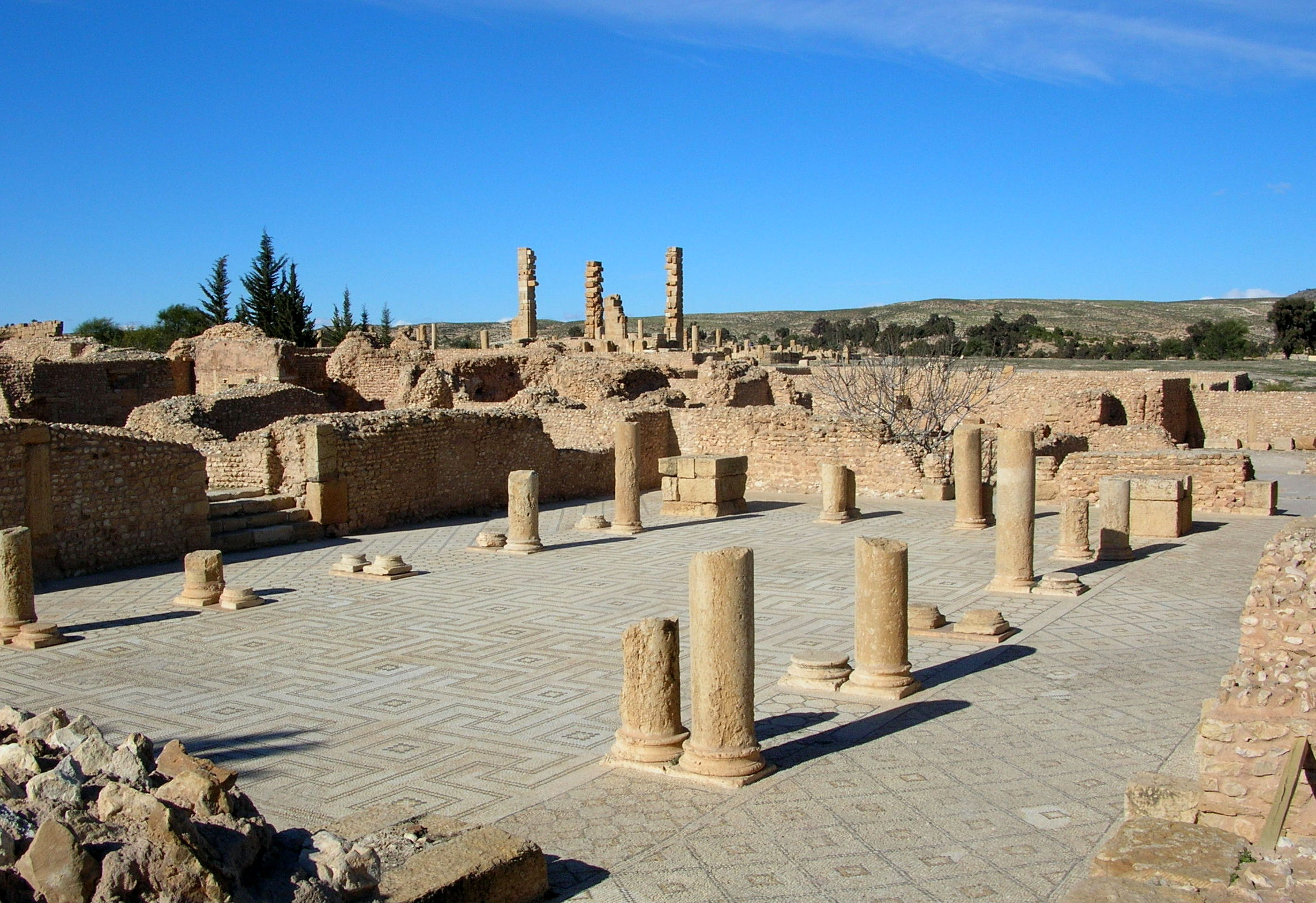
Public baths

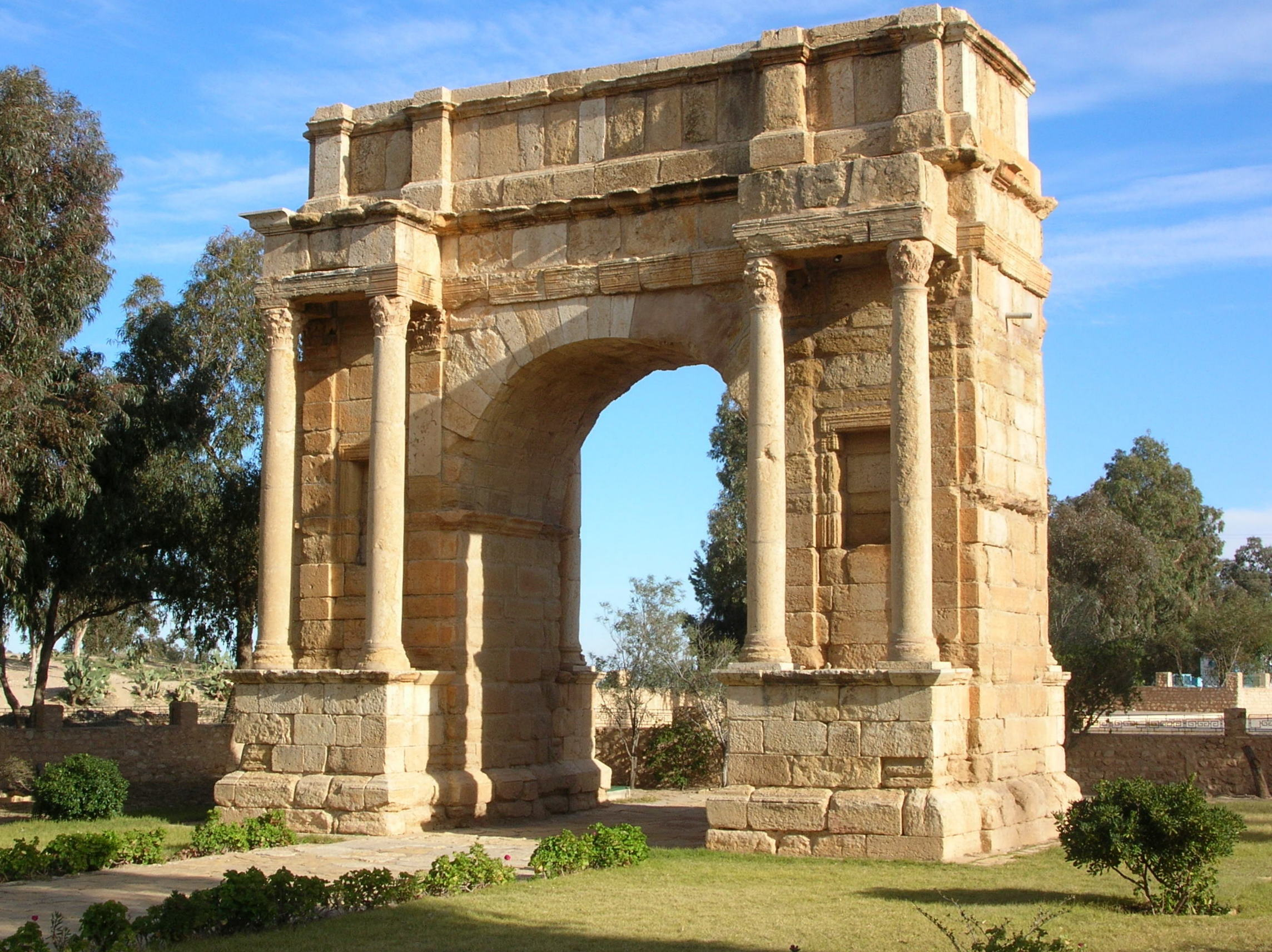
Arch of Diocletian

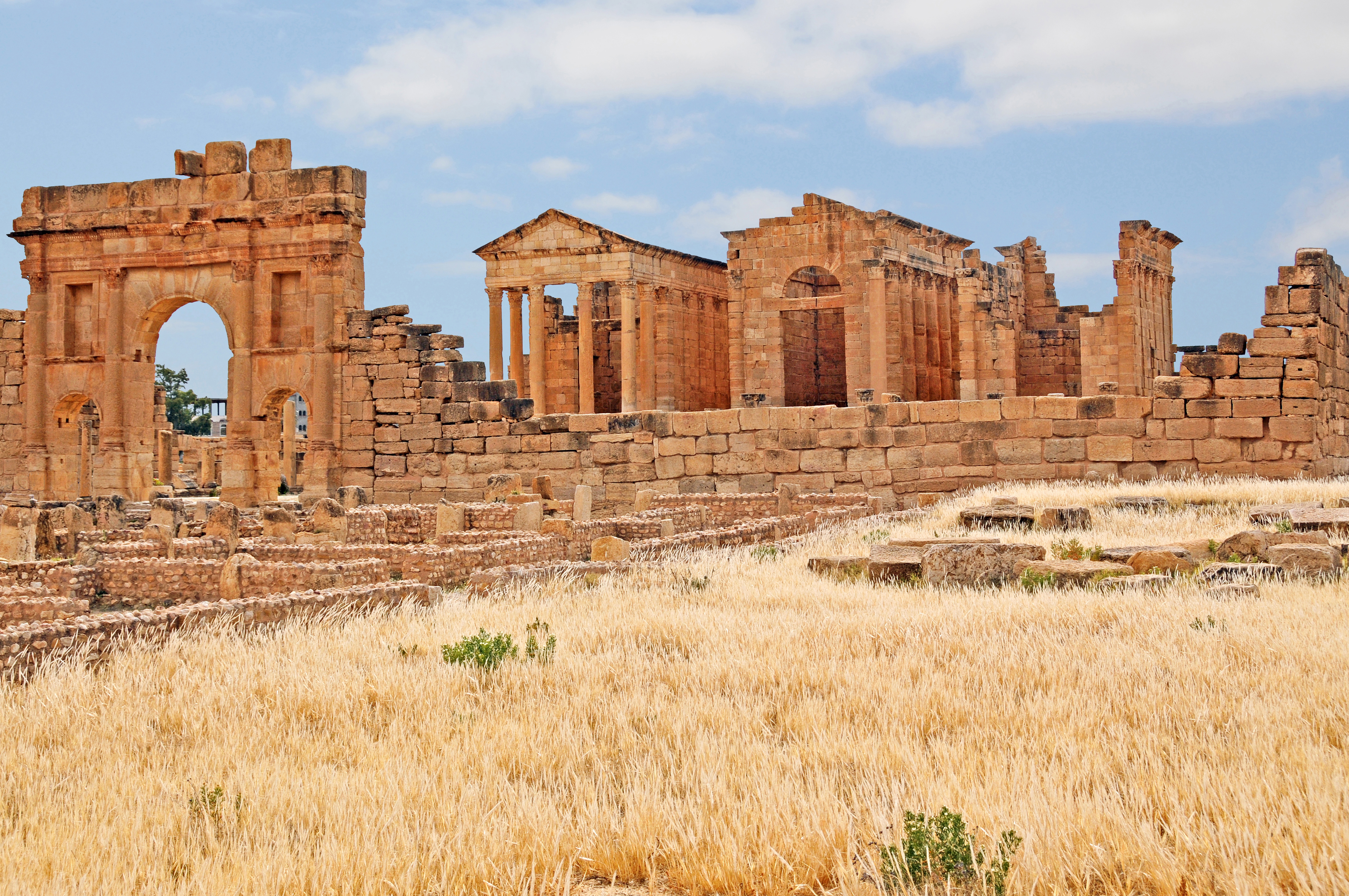
Public baths

== Administrative divisions ==
| Delegation | Population in 2021 |
|---|---|
| El Ayoun | 19,810 |
| Ezzouhour | 23,009 |
| Fériana | 55,674 |
| Foussana | 43,511 |
| Haïdra | 10,847 |
| Hassi El Ferid | 21,109 |
| Jedelienne | 12,100 |
| Kasserine Nord | 70,289 |
| Kasserine Sud | 22,299 |
| Majel Bel Abbès | 24,462 |
| Sbeïtla | 80,063 |
| Sbiba | 41,016 |
| Thala | 39,512 |
Sources : National Institute of Statistics

== Governors ==
Below the list of governors of Kasserine since its creation:

- Mustapha El Khabthani (1956–1957)
- Hédi Mabrouk (1957–1958)
- Ahmed Bellalouna (1959–1960)
- Mehrez Bellamine (1960–1961)
- Mohamed Besbes (1961–1964)
- Mohamed Bellamine (1964–1966)
- Mohamed Triki (1966–1969)
- Abdessalem Kallel (1969–1970)
- Taoufik Essid (1970–1973)
- Hédi Jédidi (1973–1978)
- Néjib Drissi (1978–1979)
- Romdhane Rahli (1979–1980)
- Abderahmen Mokrani (1980–1981)
- Kantaoui Morjane (1981–1983)
- Sadok Marzouk (1983–1984)
- Mohamed Mekki (1984–1986)
- Abdelkrim Azaïez (1986–1987)
- Mohamed Ben Saad (1987–1988)
- Hédi Ayèche (1988–1990)
- Mabrouk Bahri (1990–1993)
- Salah Kacem (August–December 1993)
- Béchir Jamaï (1993–1994)
- Mohamed Lamine El Abed (1994–1998)
- Habib Hadded (1998–2000)
- Slaheddine El Abed (2000–2001)
- Mahmoud Mehiri (2001–2003)
- Mohamed Laïd Kidoussi (2003–2005)
- Hassen Lajri (2005–2010)
- Mohamed Hafedh Cherif (2010–2011)
- Slaheddine Amouchi (2 February 2011, fired)
- Omar Belhaj Slimen (19 February-5 August 2011)
- Béchir El Bedoui (5 August 2011-27 August 2012)
- Mohamed Sidhom (27 August 2012-28 February 2014)
- Atef Boughatas (28 February 2014-22 August 2015)

== Sports ==
Kasserine Governorate's most popular sport clubs are the Union Sportif of Sbeitla and AS Kasserine.
