= Governorates of Tunisia =

Governorates of Tunisia

Tunisia is divided into 24 governorates (wilayat, sing. wilayah), also called provinces.

The governorates are divided into 264 delegations (mutamadiyat), and further subdivided into municipalities (baladiyat), and sectors (imadats). Tunisia is divided into 6 regions.

Key	Governorate	Population (2024)	Area (km^{2})	Density	Region
1	Ariana	668,552	482	1387.04	North East
2	Béja	311,417	3,740	83.27	North West
3	Ben Arous	722,828	761	949.84	North East
4	Bizerte	607,388	3,750	161.97	North East
5	Gabès	410,847	7,166	57.33	South East
6	Gafsa	388,776	7,807	49.80	South West
7	Jendouba	404,352	3,102	130.35	North West
8	Kairouan	600,803	6,712	89.51	Centre West
9	Kasserine	492,741	8,260	59.65	Centre West
10	Kebili	183,201	22,454	8.16	South West
11	Kef	237,686	4,965	47.87	North West
12	Mahdia	449,985	2,966	151.75	Centre East
13	Manouba	418,354	1,137	367.95	North East
14	Medenine	537,255	9,167	58.61	South East
15	Monastir	599,769	1,019	588.59	Centre East
16	Nabeul	863,172	2,788	309.60	North East
17	Sfax	1,047,468	7,545	138.83	Centre East
18	Sidi Bouzid	489,991	7,405	66.17	Centre West
19	Siliana	216,242	4,642	46.58	North West
20	Sousse	762,281	2,669	285.61	Centre East
21	Tataouine	162,654	38,889	4.18	South East
22	Tozeur	120,036	5,593	21.46	South West
23	Tunis	1,075,306	288	3,733.70	North East
24	Zaghouan	201,065	2,820	71.30	North East

== See also ==
- Subdivisions of Tunisia
- Delegations of Tunisia
- Grand Tunis
- ISO 3166-2:TN
