= List of rivers of Tunisia =

This is a list of rivers and wadis in Tunisia. This list is arranged by drainage basin, with respective tributaries indented under each larger stream's name.

== North Coast ==
- Oued Zouara
- Oued Sejenane
  - Oued Zitoun
- Oued Joumine
- Oued Tine
- Oued Medjerda
  - Oued Siliana
  - Oued Tessa
  - Oued Mellègue
    - Oued Sarrath
- Oued Miliane
  - Oued el Hamma

== East Coast ==
- Oued el Hadjar
- Oued Lebna
- Oued Chiba
- Oued Nebhana
- Oued Zeroud
  - Oued Merguellil
  - Oued el Hattab
  - Oued el Hajel
    - Oued el Fekka
- Oued el Leben

== Interior ==
- Oued el Melah
  - Oeud Sefioune
    - Oued el Kebir
- Oued Jeneien
