= Jesús Castro Marte =

21st-century Dominican Republic Catholic bishop

The Most Reverend Mons. Jesús Castro Marte
- Bishop of Nuestra Señora de la Altagracia in Higüey
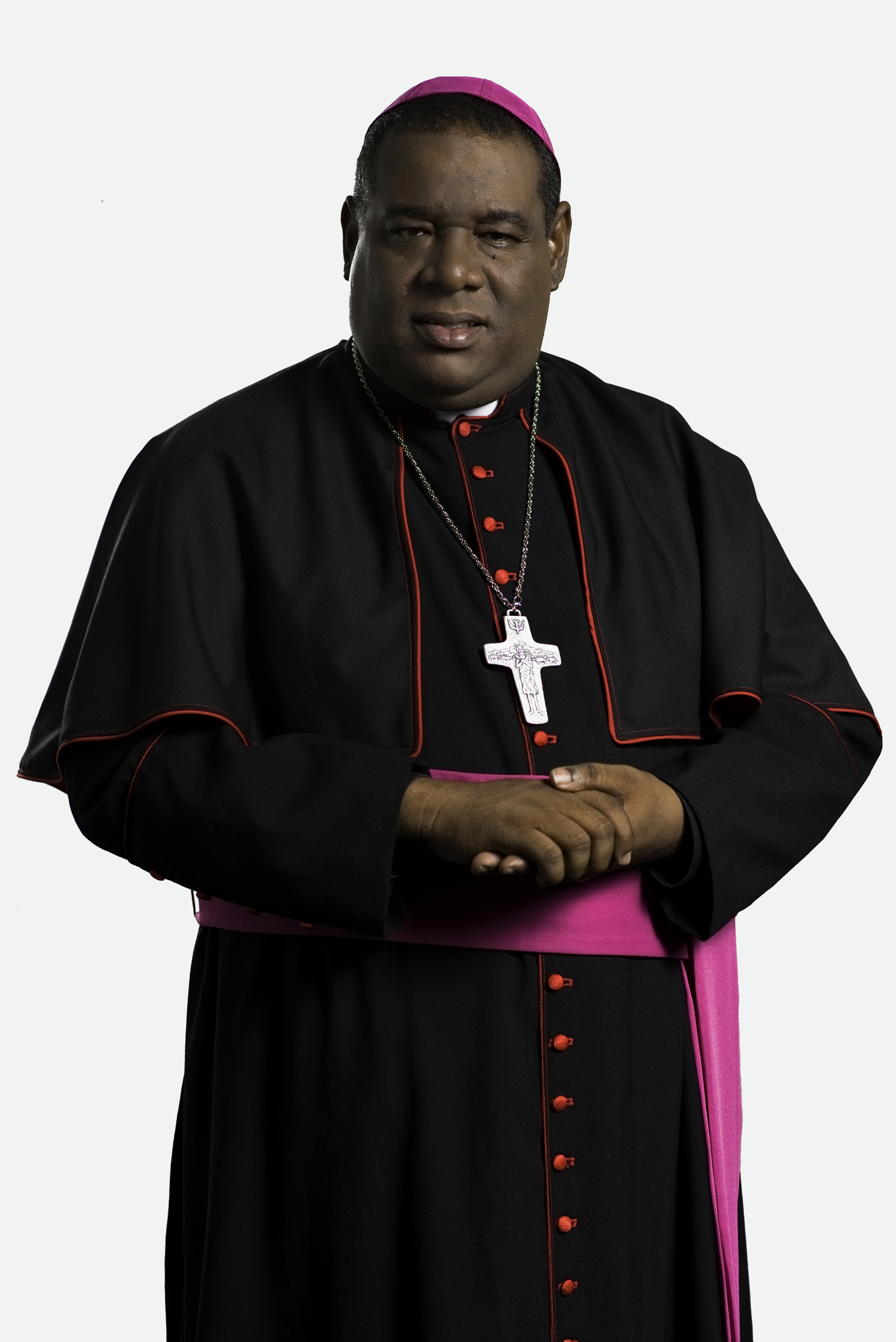
- Bishop Castro Marte in 2017
- Church: Catholic Church
- Archdiocese: Santo Domingo
- In office: 2020 –
- Predecessor: Gregorio Nicanor Peña Rodríguez
- Previous posts: Auxiliary Bishop of Santo Domingo; Titular Bishop of Giufi

Orders
- Ordination: 13 June 1995
- Consecration: 26 August 2017 by Francisco Ozoria Acosta
- Rank: Bishop

Personal details
- Born: 18 March 1966 (age 60) San Antonio de Guerra, Dominican Republic
- Motto: Væ mihi si non evangelizavero
- Coat of arms

Jesús Castro Marte (born 18 March 1966) is a Dominican Catholic bishop, being the bishop of the Diocese of Higüey since 2020. He was previously an auxiliary bishop of the Archdiocese of Santo Domingo and titular bishop of Giufi from 2017 to 2020.

== Biography ==
Castro Marte studied philosophy and theology at the Pontifical Catholic University in Santiago de los Caballeros. He then studied bioethics at the Regina Apostolorum in Rome. He was ordained a priest on 13 June 1995 for the archdiocese of Santo Domingo. On 1 July 2017 Castro Marte was appointed by Pope Francis as an auxiliary bishop of the archdiocese of Santo Domingo as well as the titular bishop of Giufi. He was ordained a bishop on 26 August 2017 by the archbishop of Santo Domingo Francisco Ozoria Acosta with the co-consecrators being Rafael Leónidas Felipe y Núñez and Andrés Napoleón Romero Cárdenas.

On 31 May 2020 Castro Marte was appointed by Pope Francis as the new bishop of Higüey. He was installed as bishop of Higüey at the Basílica Catedral Nuestra Señora de la Altagracia on 28 July 2020. Due to COVID-19 pandemic the event was streamed live with limited in-person audience.
