= Sawaf =

Sawaf may refer to:

- Ayman Sawaf (1953–2022), social commentator, film producer, entrepreneur, musician and author
- Nikolaki Sawaf (born 1943), Syrian Melkite Greek Catholic prelate, former Archbishop of Latakia
- Rama Sawaf Duwaji (born 1997), American animator, illustrator and ceramist, First Lady-designate of New York City
- Sawwaf family, Druze dynasty in Mount Lebanon
- Saouaf, a town in Zaghouan Governorate, Tunisia

== See also ==
- Sandra Saouaf, American immunologist
