= 2015 El Fahs train accident =

2015 train collision in Tunisia

2015 Tunis train accident

Details
- Date: 16 June 2015; 6:30 CET
- Location: El Fahs
- Country: Tunisia
- Incident type: collision
- Cause: No barrier at the Level crossing

Statistics
- Trains: 1 (train and lorry)
- Deaths: 19
- Injured: 98

On 16 June 2015, a collision occurred between a train and a lorry in El Fahs, Tunisia, resulting in 19 deaths and 98 injuries. The main cause of the accident was the lack of a barrier at the level crossing.
