= Henchir el Merazguia =

Coordinates: 37°12′N 9°36′E

Oued Sejenane River drainage basin

Henchir el Merazguia is a location in Tunisia, North Africa.

Henchir el Merazguia is on the Oued Sejenane River east of Bizerte and is south of Douar Salah Ben Saad. Henchir el Merazguia has an elevation of 29 metres. The town is on the north side of Ichkeul Lake.
