= Rafael Leónidas Felipe y Núñez =

Dominican Roman Catholic prelate (1938–2025)

His Excellency Rafael Leónidas Felipe y Núñez
- Bishop Emeritus of Barahona
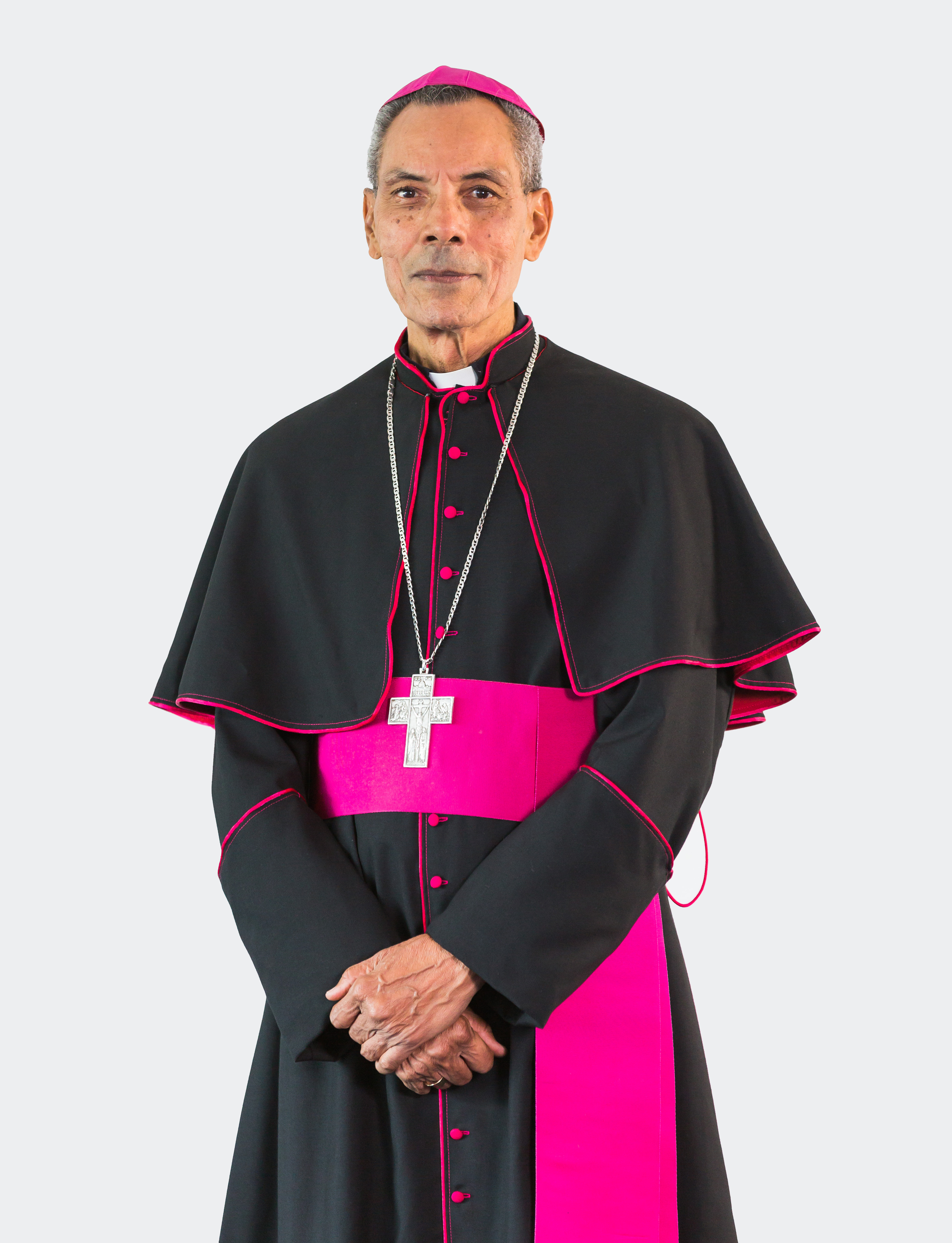
- Núñez in 2014
- Archdiocese: Santo Domingo
- Diocese: Barahona
- Appointed: 7 December 1999
- Term ended: 23 February 2015
- Predecessor: Fabio Mamerto Rivas Santos
- Successor: Andrés Napoleón Romero Cárdenas
- Other post: Apostolic Administrator of San Pedro de Macorís (2016–2017)

Orders
- Ordination: 25 March 1965 by José Humberto Quintero Parra
- Consecration: 22 January 2000 by François Bacqué, Fabio Mamerto Rivas Santos and Juan Antonio Flores Santana

Personal details
- Born: 12 September 1938 Villa Tapia, Dominican Republic
- Died: 10 December 2025 (aged 87) Santiago de los Caballeros, Dominican Republic
- Education: Pontificia Universidad Javeriana
- Motto: Jesús pastor me envía
- Coat of arms

Styles of Rafael Leónidas Felipe y Núñez
- Reference style: His Excellency; The Most Reverend
- Spoken style: Your Excellency
- Religious style: Bishop

Rafael Leónidas Felipe y Núñez (12 September 1938 – 10 December 2025) was a Dominican Roman Catholic prelate. He was bishop of Barahona from 1999 to 2015. Felipe y Núñez died on 10 December 2025, at the age of 87.

Catholic Church titles
Preceded by Fabio Mamerto Rivas Santos	Bishop of Barahona; 1999–2015	Succeeded by Andrés Napoleón Romero Cárdenas
