= El Fahs =

Coordinates: 36°22′N 9°54′E

- Commune and town
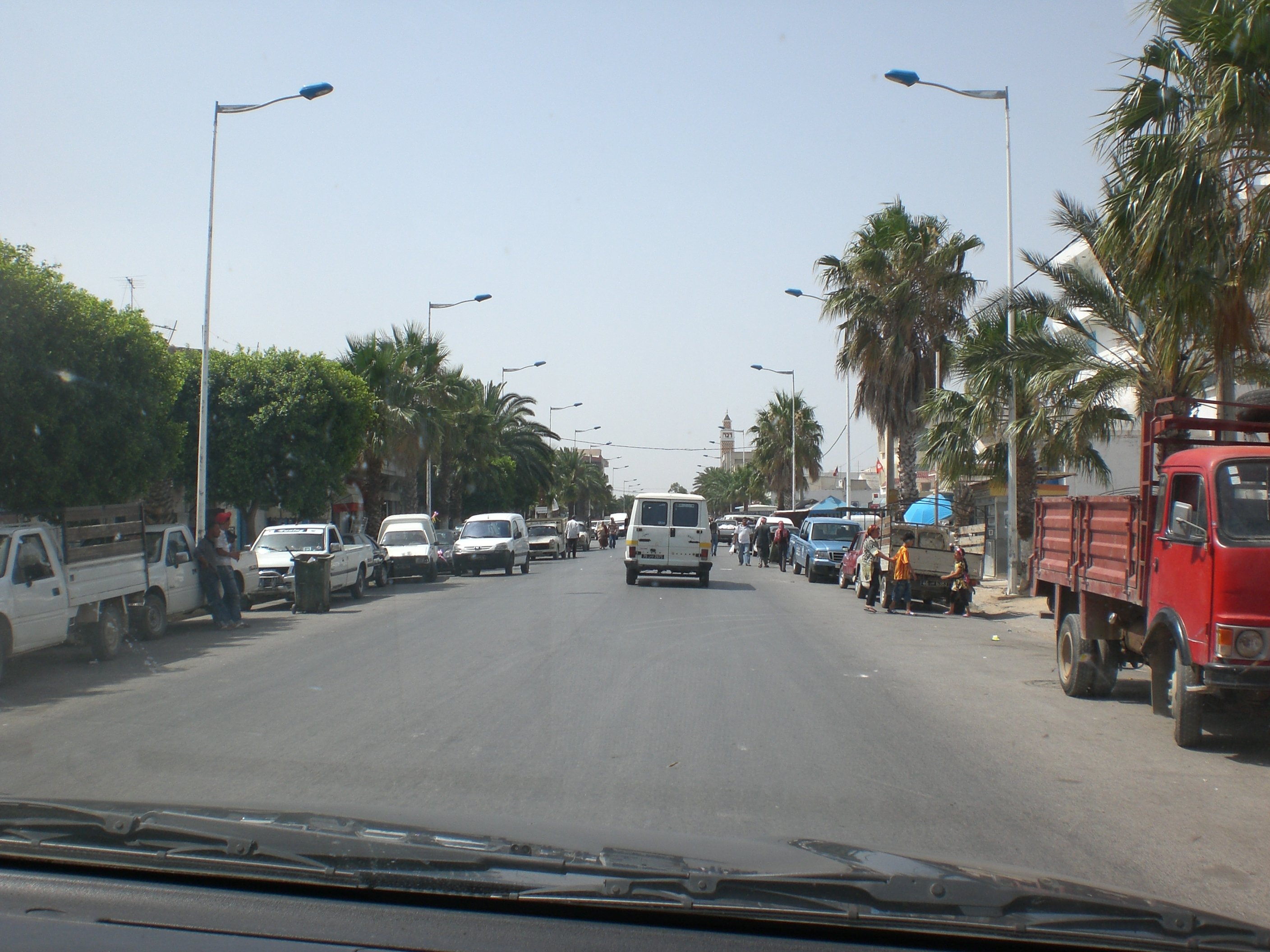
- Interactive map of El Fahs
- Country: Tunisia
- Governorate: Zaghouan Governorate

Population (2022)
  - Total: 25,100
- Time zone: UTC+1 (CET)

El Fahs (Arabic: الفحص, [lfɑħs(ˁ)]) is a town and commune located in the Zaghouan Governorate, 60 kilometers south-west of Tunis, Tunisia. Its population in 2014 was 23,556.

It is located in the Wadi Miliane valley, surrounded by mountains, in particular the Djebel Zaghouan. The Roman site of Thuburbo Majus is located 3 km away. Under the French protectorate, the city was known as Pont du Fahs, (trans. Bridge-of-Fahs), named after the remains of a Roman era bridge in the vicinity. The town was the site of a World War II battle during the Tunisia Campaign.

== Etymology ==
Etymology 1:

El Fahs or formerly known as Qantart El Fahs (Arabic: قنطرة الفحص) literally translates to "Bridge of the (medical) examination". This is because it was known to be the biggest center of public medical examination for nearby regions, near the Roman era bridge (supposedly under the Ottoman rule).

Etymology 2:

El Fahs was its original name that probably also meant "The flat hill" in Arabic, until the French came and prefixed it with "Pont d'(e)-" that translated to Arabic as "Qantara(t)" and meant "Bridge of-". The reason is that the French usually prefix a lot of urban gatheringsˈ and large towns' names by "Pont d'(e)-". Especially in North African colonies.

The proof being the French construction of the 'famous' railway in El Fahs, which represented and still symbolises the first manifestations of urbanization in the city.

== See also ==
- Pont du Fahs Airfield
