= Zriba =

Coordinates: 36°20′N 10°15′E

Hammem Zriba الزريبة حمام
- Commune and town
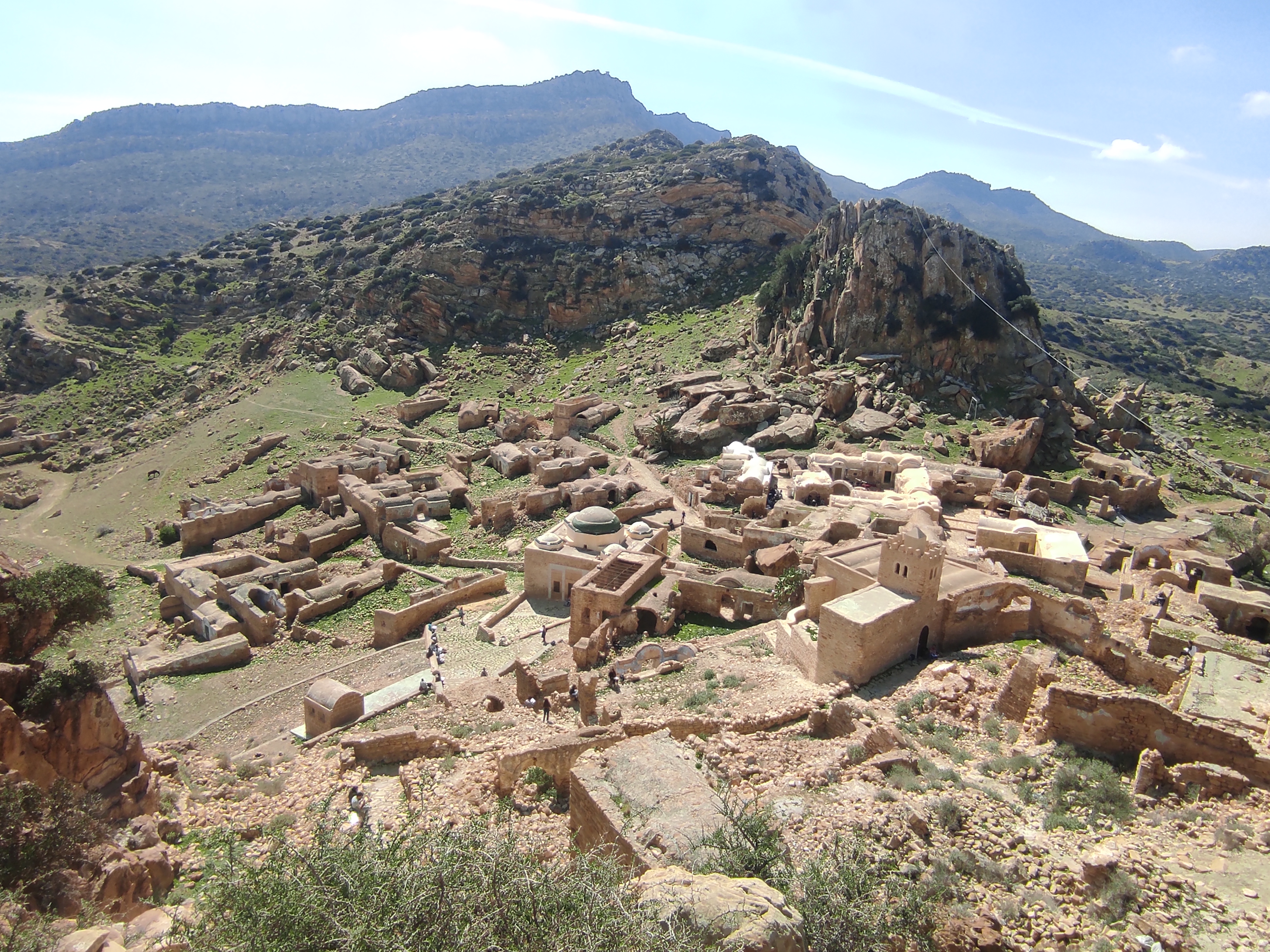
- Interactive map of Hammem Zriba
- Country: Tunisia
- Governorate: Zaghouan Governorate

Government
  - Mayor: Ibrahim Ben Amor (Nidaa Tounes)

Population (2014)
  - Total: 11,849
- Time zone: UTC+1 (CET)
- Postal code: 1152

Zriba is a town and commune in the Zaghouan Governorate, Tunisia. As of 2004, it had a population of 9,022.

== Population ==
2014 Census (Municipal)
Homes	Families	Males	Females	Total
3576	3071	6023	5796	11819

A genetic sample of Arabs from Zriba showed a 100% prevalence of the Berber-associated sub-haplogroup E-M183, a sub-haplogroup of E-Z827.

== See also ==
- List of cities in Tunisia
