= Nadhour =

Coordinates: 36°07′19″N 10°05′34″E

- Commune and town
- Interactive map of Nadhour
- Country: Tunisia
- Governorate: Zaghouan Governorate

Population (2014)
  - Total: 7,576
- Time zone: UTC+1 (CET)

Nadhour is a town and commune in the Zaghouan Governorate, Tunisia. As of 2004 it had a population of 5,207.

== Population ==
2014 Census (Municipal)
Homes	Families	Males	Females	Total
2176	1806	3764	3803	7567

== See also ==
- List of cities in Tunisia
