= Oued Jeneien =

Oued Jeneien is a wadi of Taţāwīn, Tunisia. It is also known as Wādī al Janā’in, and Oued Djeneien. in the far south of the country.

The wadi is at Latitude 31°39'55.47", Longitude: 9°49'10.16" and 273 meters above Sea level. The wadi is an internal stream flowing, and dissipating into the Sahara rather than flowing into the Mediterranean. The wadi is near the settlements of Gara M'hamed Ali and Tarfa.
