= Oued Zitoun (Tunisia) =

River in Tunisia

Coordinates: 37°03′N 9°23′E

The Oued Zitoun (وادى الزيتون) is a river of Tunisia, North Africa.

The Oued Zitoum is a tributary of the Oued Sejenane which flows into the Mediterranean near Bizerte. The river is known for the Cascades of Oued Zitoun, and is near to Ichkeul National Park, and the forest of Sajane.

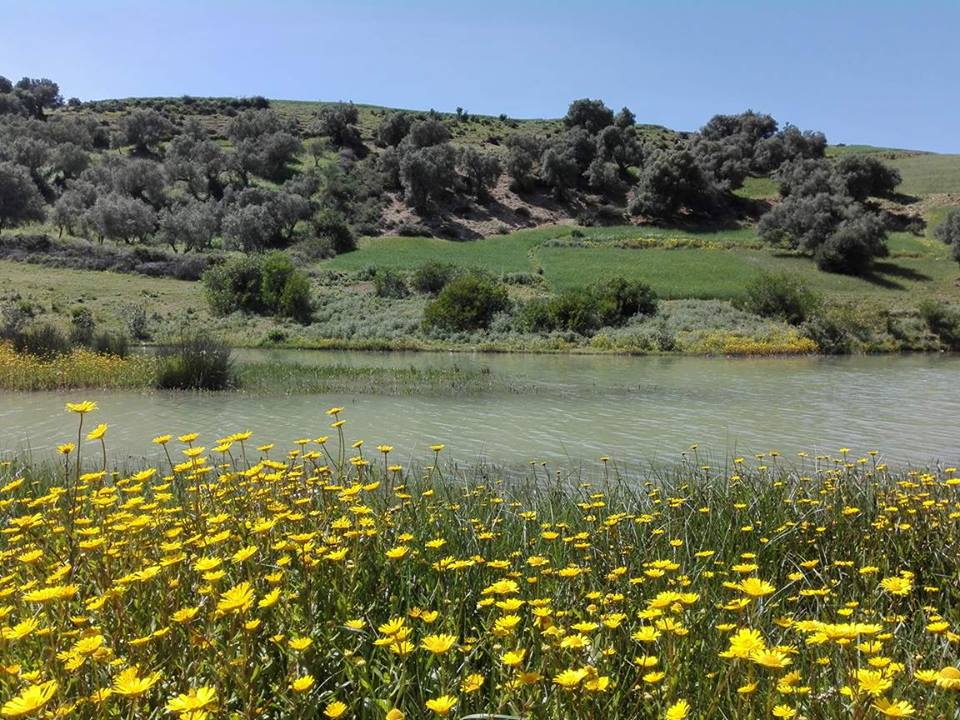
Flower of oued Zitoun River

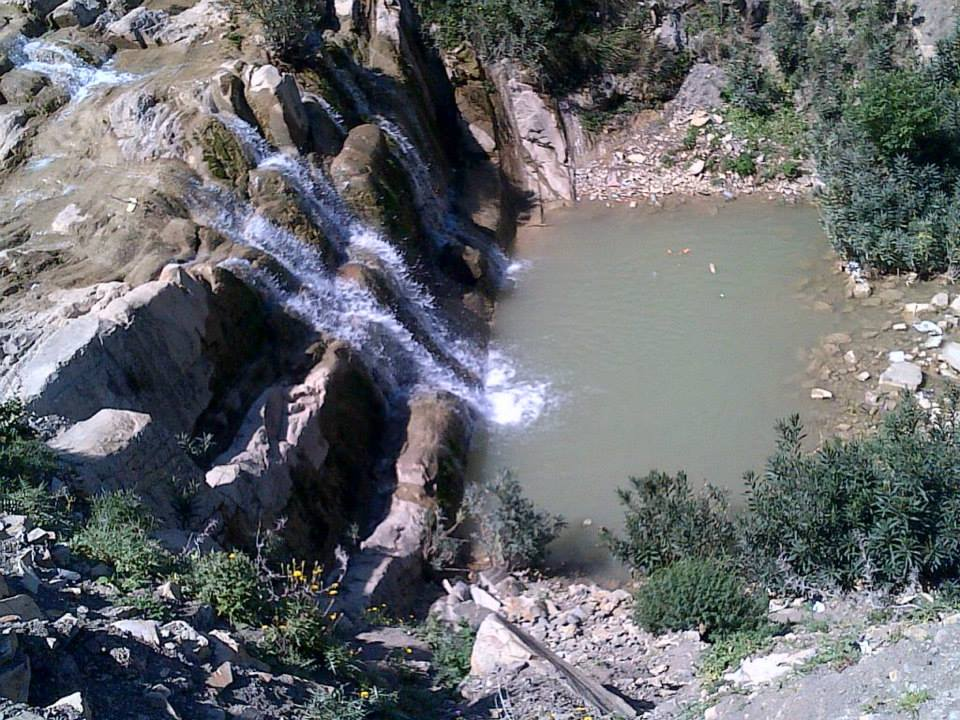
Oued zitoun Cascades

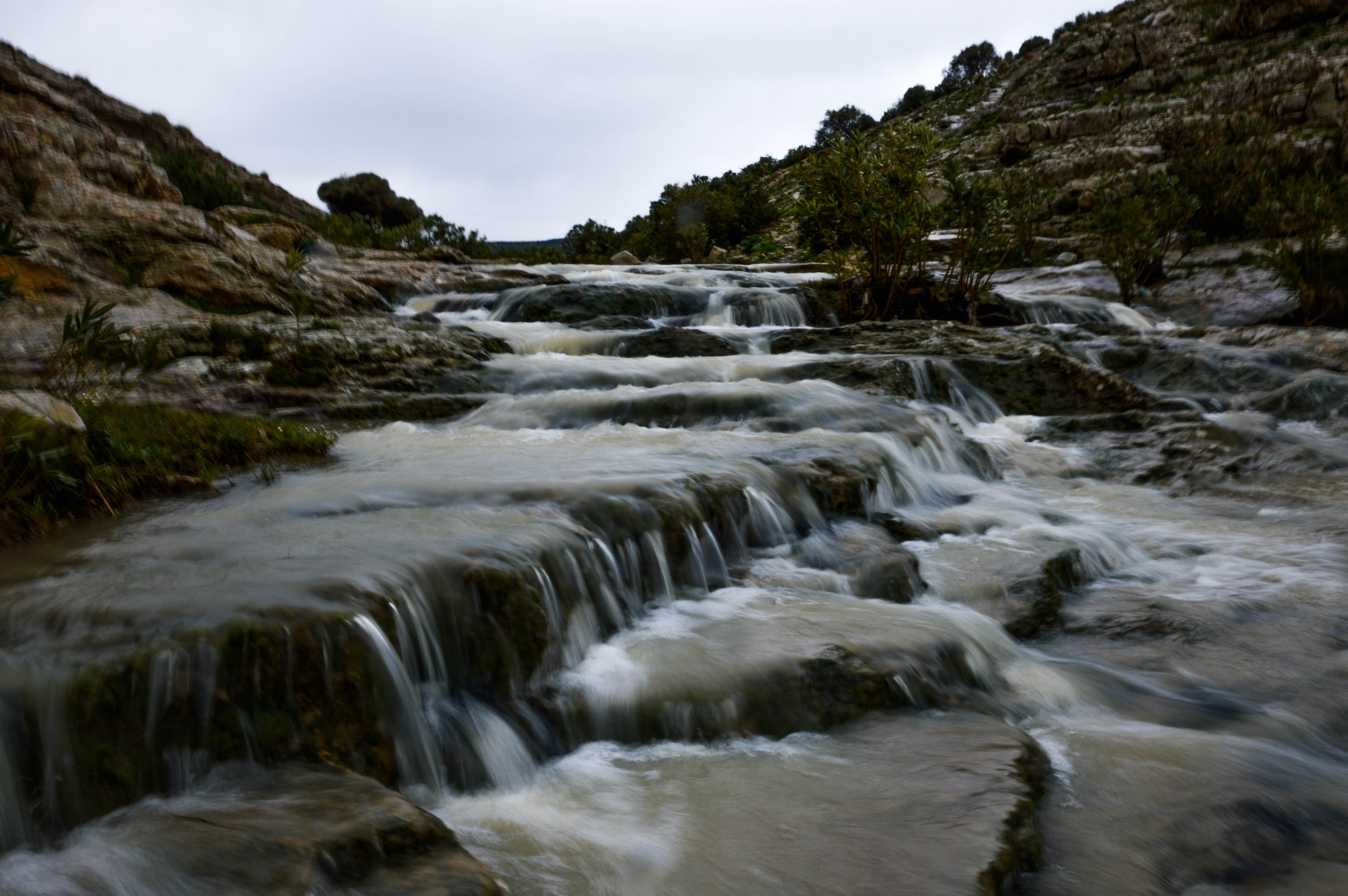
Oued Zitoune Cascades

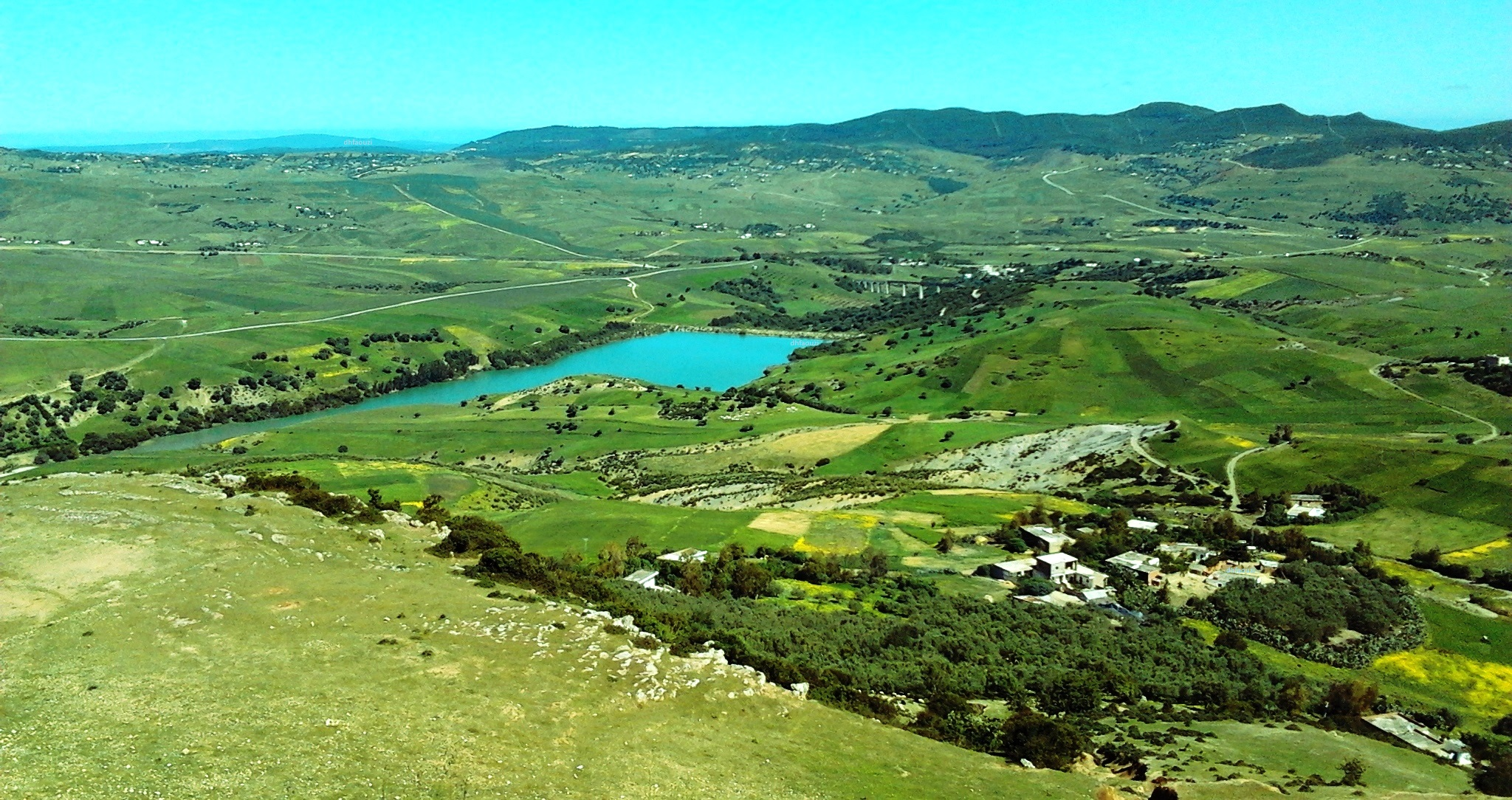
Oued Zitoun near Ghezala Tunisia.

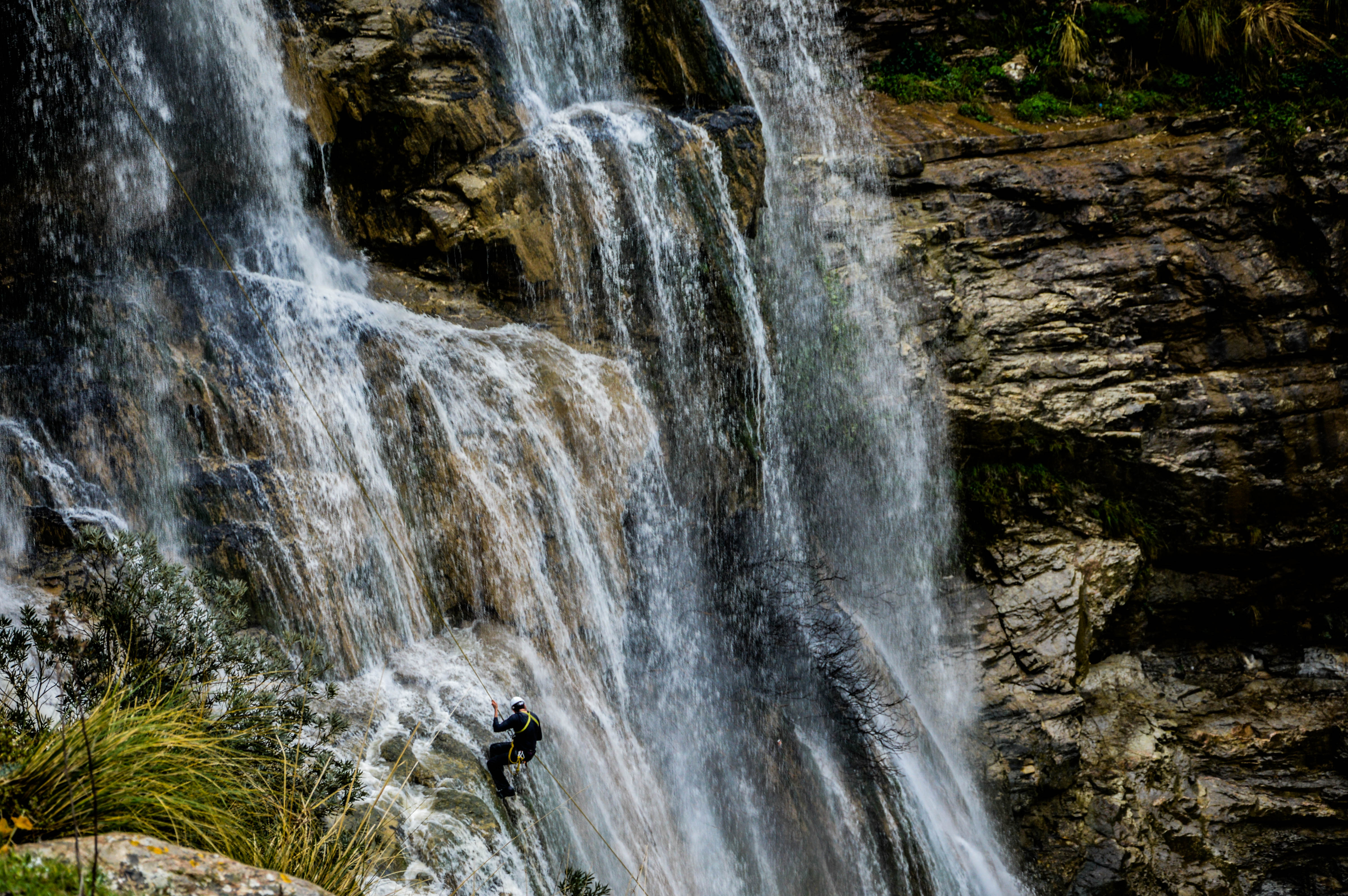
Olive Valley Waterfall(شلال واد زيتون) Zitoun
