= Bir-Mecherga =

Bir Mcherga
- Commune and town
- Interactive map of Bir Mcherga
- Country: Tunisia
- Governorate: Zaghouan Governorate

Population (2014)
  - Total: 13,665
- Time zone: UTC+1 (CET)

Bir Mcherga ( Arabic : بئر مشارڨة ) is a town and commune in the Zaghouan Governorate, Tunisia in the northwest of Tunisia, the site of former Roman North African city and bishopric Giufi, which only remains as Latin Catholic titular see.

It is located fifty kilometers southwest of Tunis at 36° 31 'north, 9° 58 'east, in the Zaghouan Governorate. As of 2004 it had a population of 7,203.

== Modern town ==
Bir Mchergais is a municipality of 7203 inhabitants and the chief town of a 'delegation' of 21 508 inhabitants comprising several sectors including that of Djebel Oust.

The city participates in the loosening of the industrial activities of the capital, notably because of its situation on the RN3 . With Djebel Oust, it hosts three large industrial zones on more than 300 hectares. Its labor force employs more than 35% in industry (21% nationally).

Bir Mcherga is located a few kilometers from the dam of Bir Mcherga, one of two dams on the Wadi Miliane, located 35 kilometers from its mouth in the Gulf of Tunis Benefiting from a watershed of 1,442 km 2, its reservoir lake irrigatean area of 1,600 hectares while avoiding the flood spectrum for the capital.

== History ==
Giufi was among the many cities of sufficient importance to become a suffragan diocese in the Roman province of Africa Proconsularis, in the papal sway.

It historically documented bishops were, as phrased in the sources :

- Victor, episcopus plebis Iufitanae, who intervened at the Council of Carthage called in 411, among the Catholic bishops, without schismatic counterpart of the disputed and condemned heresy Donatism
- Fortunius, episcopus ecclesiae Ofitanae, participant at the African council of 646 which pronounced against monothelitism as a heresy on instigation of monk Maximus the Confessor.

== Titular see ==
The diocese was nominally restored in 1933 as Latin titular bishopric of Giufi (Latin = Curiate Italian) / Giufitan(us) (Latin adjective).

Bishops of Giufi
From	Until	Incumbent	Notes
25 December 1949	25 April 1959	John Baptist Hubert Theunissen, S.M.M.	Simultaneously Apostolic Vicar of Blantyre in Malawi. On 25 April 1959 appointed as Archbishop of Blantyre.
10 October 1959	14 December 1978	Bogdan Stefanov Dobranov	Previously a priest. On 22 July 1975 appointed as Apostolic Vicar of Sofia-Plodviv in Bulgaria. On 14 December 1978 appointed as Bishop of Sofia-Plovdiv.
14 September 1980	29 July 1985	Petar Čule	The only Archbishop of Giufi. Previously Bishop of Mostar-Duvno and Apostolic Administrator of Trebinje-Mrkan in Yugoslavia. Died in office.
28 August 1987	6 November 2004	Edouard Mathos	Simultaneously Bishop Coadjutor of Bossangoa in the Central African Republic. On 6 November 2004 appointed as Bishop of Bambari in the Central African Republic.
9 March 2005	26 September 2012	Tomé Ferreira da Silva	Simultaneously Bishop Coadjutor of São Paulo in Brazil. On 26 September 2012 appointed as Bishop of São José do Rio Preto in Brazil.
20 February 2013	31 May 2017	José Mário Scalon Angonese	Simultaneously Bishop Coadjutor of Curitiba in Brazil. On 31 May 2017 appointed as Bishop of Uruguaiana in Brazil.
31 July 2017	30 May 2020	Jesús Castro Marte	Simultaneously Bishop Coadjutor of Santo Domingo in Dominican Republic.
4 November 2020	present	Valter Magno de Carvalho	Simultaneously Auxiliary Bishop of São Salvador da Bahia in Brazil.

== See also ==
- Giufi Salaria
- List of Catholic dioceses in Algeria

== Sources and external links ==
- GCatholic - (former and) titular see

Bibliography - ecclesiastical history

- J. Mesnage, L'Afrique chrétienne, Paris 1912, p. 108
