= Battle of Sabana Real =

1691 battle between Dominican soldiers and French soldiers

- Part of the Nine Years' War
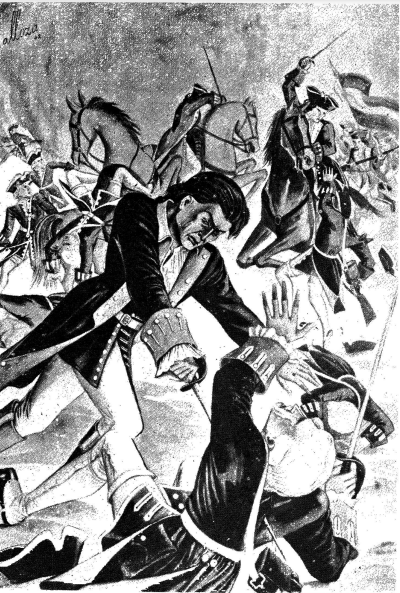
- Illustration of the Battle of Sabana Real, artwork by José Alloza
| Date | January 21, 1691; |
| Location | Captaincy General of Santo Domingo (in present-day Limonade, Haiti) |
| Result | Spanish victory |

Belligerents
| Santo Domingo | France |

Commanders and leaders
| Francisco de Segura Sandoval y Castilla | (Kingdom of France) De Cussy † |

Strength
| 700 Spanish Dominican raiders 2,600 militiamen | 1,000 |

Casualties and losses
| 47 dead 130 wounded | 400 dead |

The Battle of Sabana Real (Spanish: Batalla de Sabana Real) took place on January 21, 1691. An army of 700 Dominican raiders and 2,600 militiamen aboard five warships of the Armada de Barlovento, circled and overwhelmed 1,000 French defenders at Sabana de la Limonade; Governor de Cussy and 400 of his followers were killed.

This incident, among others, led Spain to formally recognize French control of some Caribbean territory in the Treaty of Ryswick in order to avoid further conflicts again in the future: Tortuga Island and the western third of the adjacent island of Hispaniola, where the French colony of Saint-Domingue was later established.

== Background ==
=== French invasion of Santiago ===
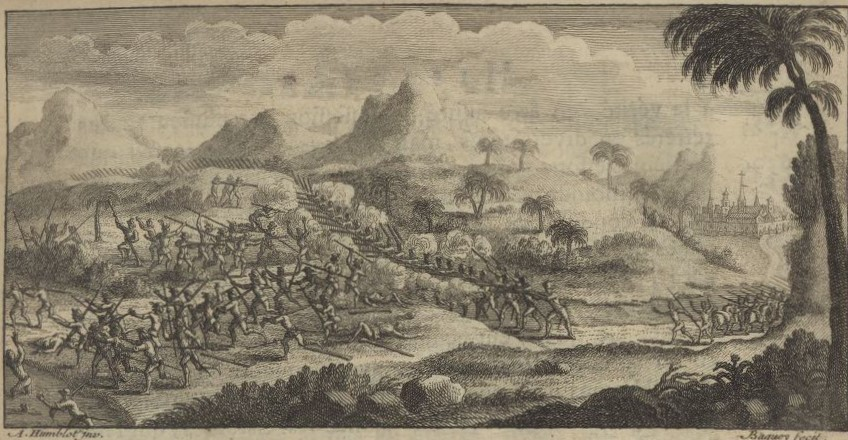
Invasion of Santiago de los Caballeros by Pierre-Paul Tarin de Cussy.

On June 6, 1690, De Cussy and his militias entered Santiago, the most important town in the entire Cibao region, and subjected it to pillage because its inhabitants had all fled in time, leaving the town completely abandoned. At the end of the mass robbery, De Cussy's troops burned it before beginning their retreat towards the French side. Along the entire northwest line, from Santiago to the border, the French left a desolate specter.

When the news of what the French did reached Admiral Ignacio Pérez-Caro y Fernández, he became irritated and wanted to request by any means suggested the possibility of revenge to achieve the absolute extermination of the French and evict them from the island, for which Admiral Ignacio Pérez-Caro wanted to reduce their forces with repeated hostilities to obtain the opportunity to achieve the French defeat. He would order the military corporals of Santiago and those of the towns of Azua and Hincha, to continually harass the French to obtain information on the people, militia captains and Corsicans with whom he was in contact. the disposition of its fortresses, towns and the rest that would lead to Spanish interest. Following those orders from the Governor, Captain Vicente Martín with the troops from the south together with the residents of Hincha and Azua killed 28 Frenchmen, imprisoned 9 and burned a large house with 4 huts. The residents of Azua burned 300 hides in a ranch, without the ones they took out for their needs, which were many. The northern troops killed 3 Frenchmen and imprisoned 7 casualties.

=== Reinforcements from Spain ===
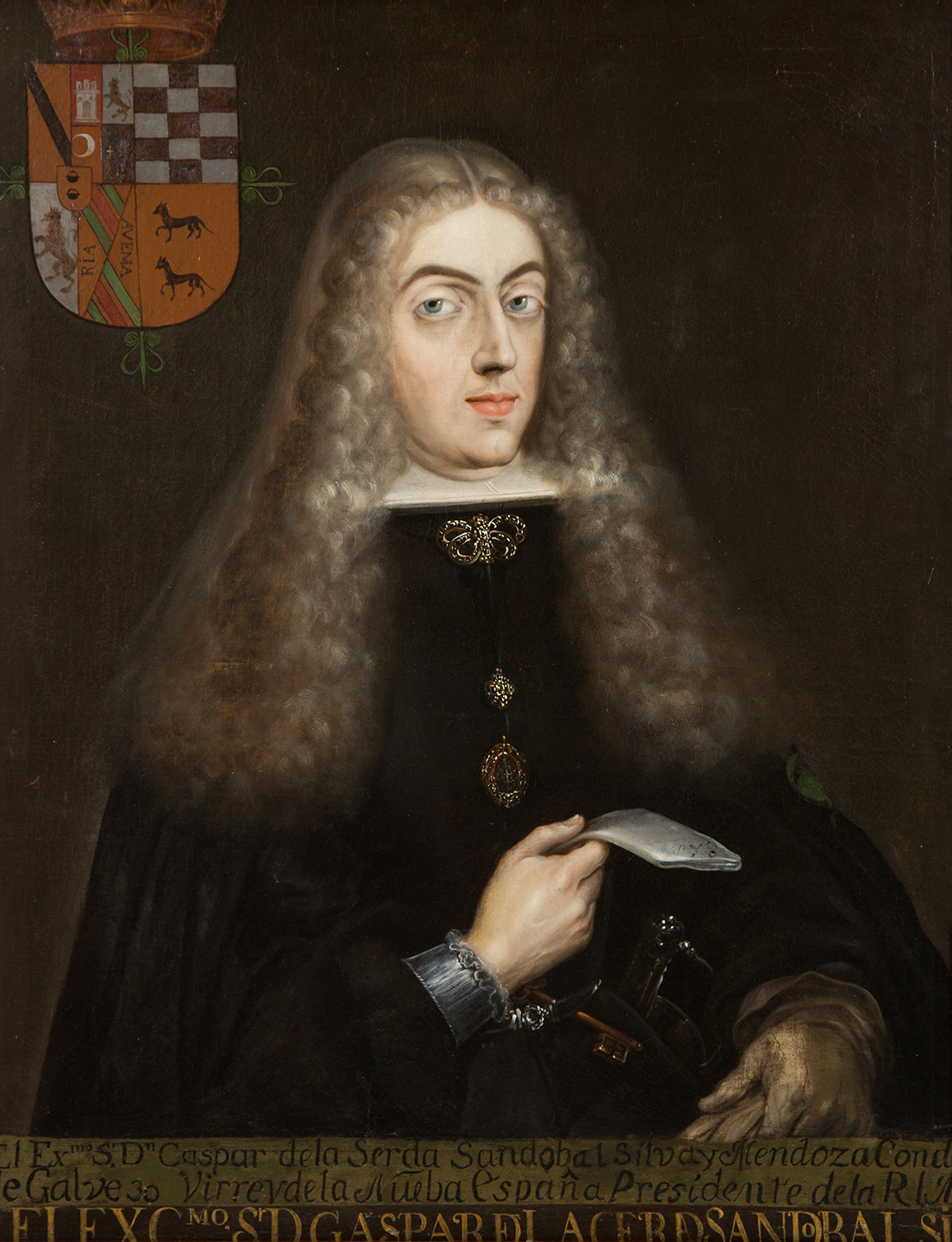

Seeing the impending threat, reinforcements from Spain became necessary. On July 4, 1690, Viceroy Gaspar de la Cerda Sandoval y Mendoza, Count of Galve, ordered that the royal armada of Barlovento be sent to Santo Domingo. He declared the following:

The wars of France being declared and this nation having many populations on this island with close proximity to ours, for which reason the governor and captain general of it may have orders from his Majesty for some operation, or reason in itself to ensure its borders, or enter the opposite ones, from where the vassals of His Majesty receive many hostilities and robberies in the work and estates of those territories, keeping them in continuous sleeplessness, considering that it could be that, due to lack of maritime forces, the governor and captain general of said island to do or attempt some good effect that would result in greater security for the vassals and dominions of his Majesty, it has seemed appropriate to his royal service to place the Navy at the command of said governor and captain general so that, using hisforces, if he needs them, apply them to the operation and effect that he finds most convenient and necessary for his safety and proportionate to them; resolving the employment that will be determined in a meeting with the military corporals of that place and with those of the Navy; and the operation that is resolved in it will be carried out by General Don Jacinto Lope Gijón and his admiral, Don Antonio de Astina, and other military and sea corporals of the Windward Navy, keeping the provisions given by the governor and captain general of the island of Santo Domingo, which I do not doubt will be arranged in this by the orders of your Majesty and the experiences acquired during the time of your government, so that the good effect that I desire in the royal service is happily achieved. And because if one of the cases expressed arises, the general of the Navy cannot embarrass himself by saying that he lacks my order, it seemed to me to give it and warn him to execute it; and of what is done and resolved in this, he will bring the general testimony and entire report of what happened so that he can give it to his Majesty.”

Gaspar de la Cerda y Mendoza

On November 9, 1690, the royal fleet of Barlovento dawned over the port of the City of Santo Domingo and after having delivered the royal located to the officers of Santo Domingo, General Lope Gijón, the Admiral, left for the City of Santo Domingo. Antonio de Astina and other Captains, after the mutual congratulations dictated by civility to the meeting that was held in the palace of the royal houses of Admiral Ignacio Caro, where the most circumspect characters of the res publica attended and the authorities of Santo were pleased Domingo upon learning that the French royal fleet had been defeated on October 6, 1691.

=== Preparations for battle ===
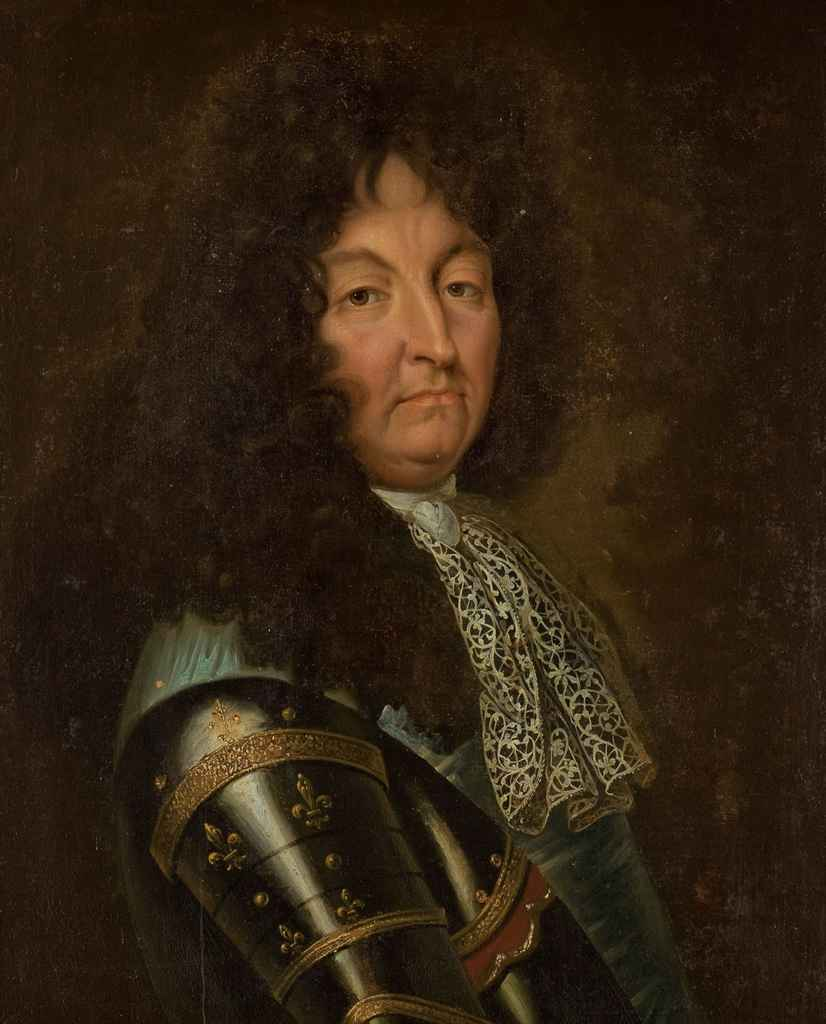

A war junta was formed made up of Field Master Pedro Morel of Santa Cruz, Sergeant Major Antonio Picardo Vinuesa and other Captains of the island. The advance to the port of Guarico and immediate towns was what was resolved in that meeting, and before dissolving it, Admiral Caro sent strict orders so that, both from the people of the prison of that square and from the militiamen of the city and places From inland, 13,000 men were recruited, which were then judged sufficient for the army; and pointing out Santiago de los Caballeros as the parade ground, they began to prevent supplies and ammunition. To also remedy the pilot defect of those northern coasts with which the navy pilots were burdened, among many who generously offered themselves for this endeavor, Admiral Caro appointed 10 lancers from the northern coast.

The majority acclamation requested that command be given to Field Master Francisco de Segura Sandoval and they promoted with applause the common voice of Admiral Caro, the ministers of the Royal Court of Santo Domingo, General Lope and the corporals. Field Master Francisco Sandoval agreed to assume command and would leave for Manzanillo Bay (meeting point with the Barlovento fleet), accompanied by 15 companies on November 21, 1690.

== Battle ==
On January 21, 1691, in Limonada, the French, advancing their left horn a little, encountered the Spanish; they were given a musketry charge that they overlooked. He responded to it with continuous battery in the form of a skirmish, and having returned as 6 or 7, the Field Master Francisco de Segura, the Field Master Morel and the Sergeant Major Antonio Picardo warned that not only was his body coming on the Spanish right left, in which Pierre Tarin de Cussy and all his captains were, but he paraded a few sleeves to attack the Spanish side that was without shelter from firearms. When the spearmen were given the order to attack, they said: "Advance, Spaniards! Santiago to them!”

Francisco de Segura Sandoval y Castilla An hour after the battle began, the hidden volunteers of Salvaleón de Higüey climbed behind the Duclée hill. They surprised and completely eliminated the French leadership, killing 32 officers, including De Cussy and his Lieutenant General Fransquenay. Seeing the French from afar, the massacre of their high command, the French broke ranks and fled, leaving the Spanish behind.

== The miracle ==
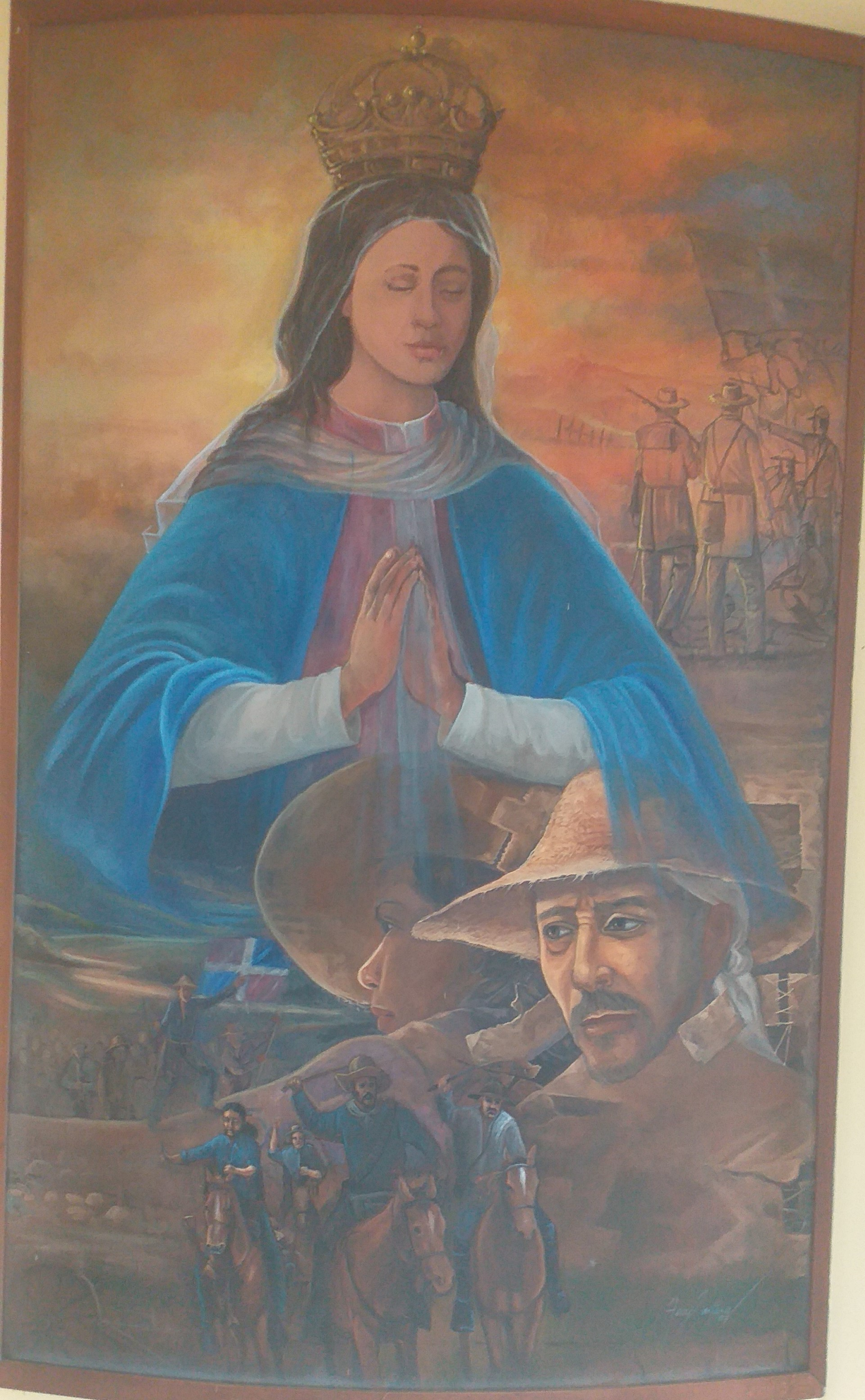
Monument of Our Lady of the Altagracia - at the Monumento a los Héroes de la Restauración.

Each and every one of the volunteers from Higüey who had entrusted themselves under the protection of Our Lady of Altagracia, returned safe and sound, without any scratches. This was seen as a clear answer to his prayers and a patent miracle.

== Results ==
The Spanish victory was promoted in the Kingdom of Mexico (New Spain) mainly in 2 texts written by Carlos de Sigüenza: Report of what happened to the Windward Armada and Trophy of Spanish justice, the second includes as an annex the Gratulatory Epinicios.

=== Dajabón River ===
Due to the massacres suffered by the French in the Spanish attacks, they changed the name of the Dajabón River to the name of Masacre.

== See also ==
- Siege of Santo Domingo (1655)
- Battle of Palo Hincado
