= Diocese of Barahona =

Roman Catholic diocese in the Dominican Republic

Coordinates: 18.2047°N 71.0969°W

Diocese of Barahona Dioecesis Barahonensis

Location
- Country: Dominican Republic
- Ecclesiastical province: Province of Santo Domingo
- Metropolitan: Barahona

Statistics
- Area: 2,892 km^{2} (1,117 sq mi)
- Population: Total; Catholics: (as of 2006); 357,000; 191,000 (53.5%)
- Parishes: 20

Information
- Denomination: Roman Catholic
- Rite: Latin Rite
- Established: 24 April 1976 (49 years ago)
- Cathedral: Cathedral of Our Lady of the Rosary

Current leadership
- Pope: Leo XIV
- Bishop: Rev. Andrés Napoleón Romero Cárdenas

Map
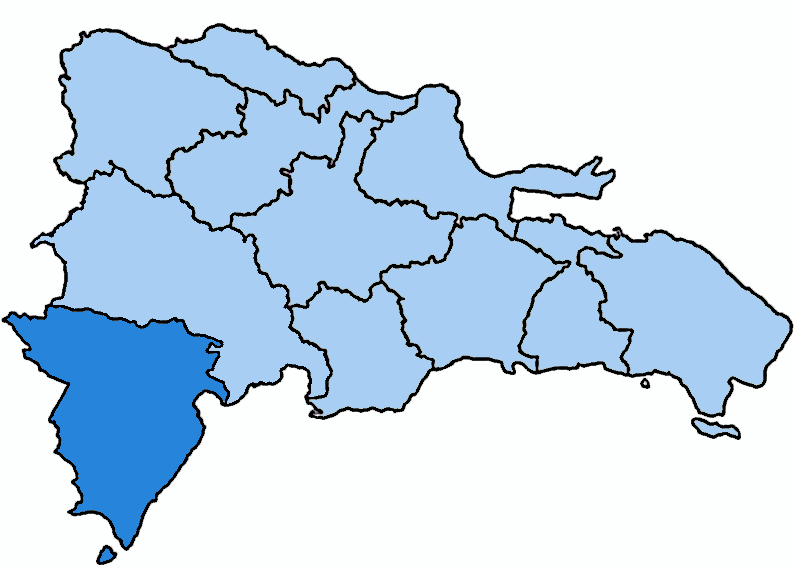

The Roman Catholic Diocese of Barahona (Latin: Dioecesis Barahonensis) (erected 24 April 1976) is a suffragan diocese of the Archdiocese of Santo Domingo.

== Ordinaries ==
- Fabio Mamerto Rivas Santos, S.D.B. (1976–1999) – Bishop Emeritus
- Rafael Leónidas Felipe y Núñez (1999–2015) – resigned, Bishop Emeritus
- Andrés Napoleón Romero Cárdenas (2015–present)
