= Our Lady of Altagracia =

Title of the Virgin Mary

La Virgen de la Altagracia
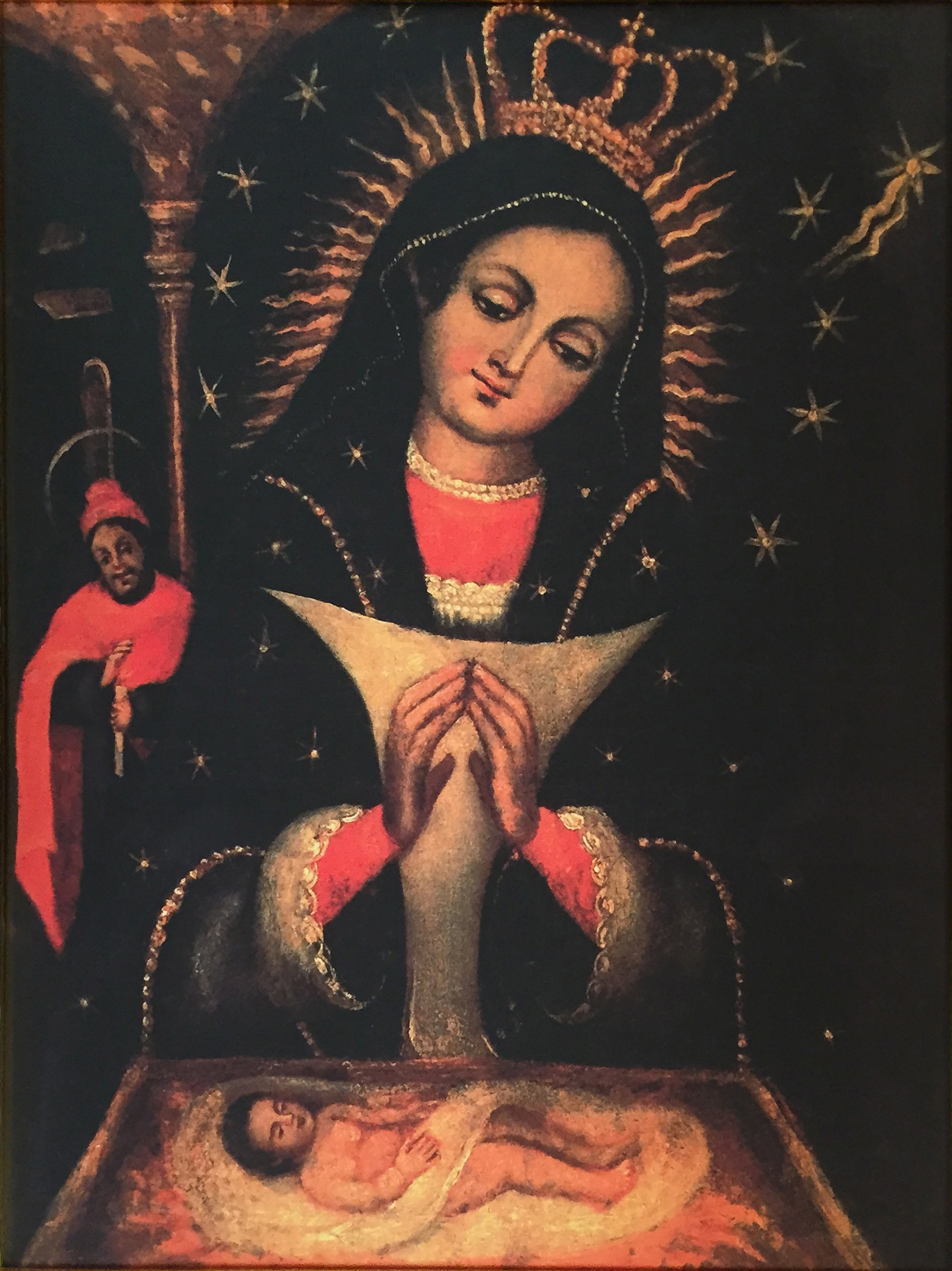
- Spiritual mother of the Dominican Republic and its people

Protective and Spiritual Mother of the Dominican People
- Venerated in: Roman Catholic Church; introduced to Hispaniola in 1502
- Major shrine: Basílica Catedral Nuestra Señora de la Altagracia
- Feast: January 21
- Attributes: The Star of Bethlehem and 12 stars that represent the tribes of Israel and a silver crown
- Patronage: The Dominican Republic and in any difficult situation

Our Lady of Altagracia or the Virgin of Altagracia (Our Lady of High Grace) in Catholic Marian devotion, is a title of Mary by which she is honored as the “protective and spiritual mother of the Dominican people.” The title also is used for a particular image of Mary with the baby Jesus in a manger. Her patronal feast day is January 21, a holiday/non-working day in the Dominican Republic on which many faithful devotees of the Virgin come from all over the Dominican territory to the Basilica-Cathedral of Our lady of Altagracia, in the province of La Altagracia. Devotion to her is also prominent in areas outside of the Dominican Republic where Dominican influence flourishes, including New York City, where her feast marks the beginning of Dominican Heritage Month.

The image of the Virgin of Altagracia shows symbols and imagery that are important in Marian devotion, including Jesus in a manger, a crown of stars and a mantle of stars for Mary, and symbolic colors.

The feast day was officially established by a bishop in 1692, but devotion had probably begun a century or two earlier. One story said that the venerated image is based on an appearance of Mary to a young girl in Spain, and that the painting was brought to Hispaniola by two brothers when the Spanish were establishing a colony; another says that a girl on the island had a dream of the "Virgin of Altagracia," prompting her father to find the image and bring it to the village of Salvaleón de Higüey around 1500. The Virgin's intercession is credited for victory of a Spanish-Dominican force over a French force in 1691.

In the 20th century, this devotion was given various forms of affirmation and approval, including the Dominican Congress' declaration of an official holiday, a papal declaration by Pius XI, and a blessing of the Basicilia-Cathedral (then called the Sanctuary of Altagracia) by Pope John Paul II during his 1979 visit. Similarly, Pope Francis sent a golden rose to honor her in 2022.

== The image of the Virgin of Altagracia ==
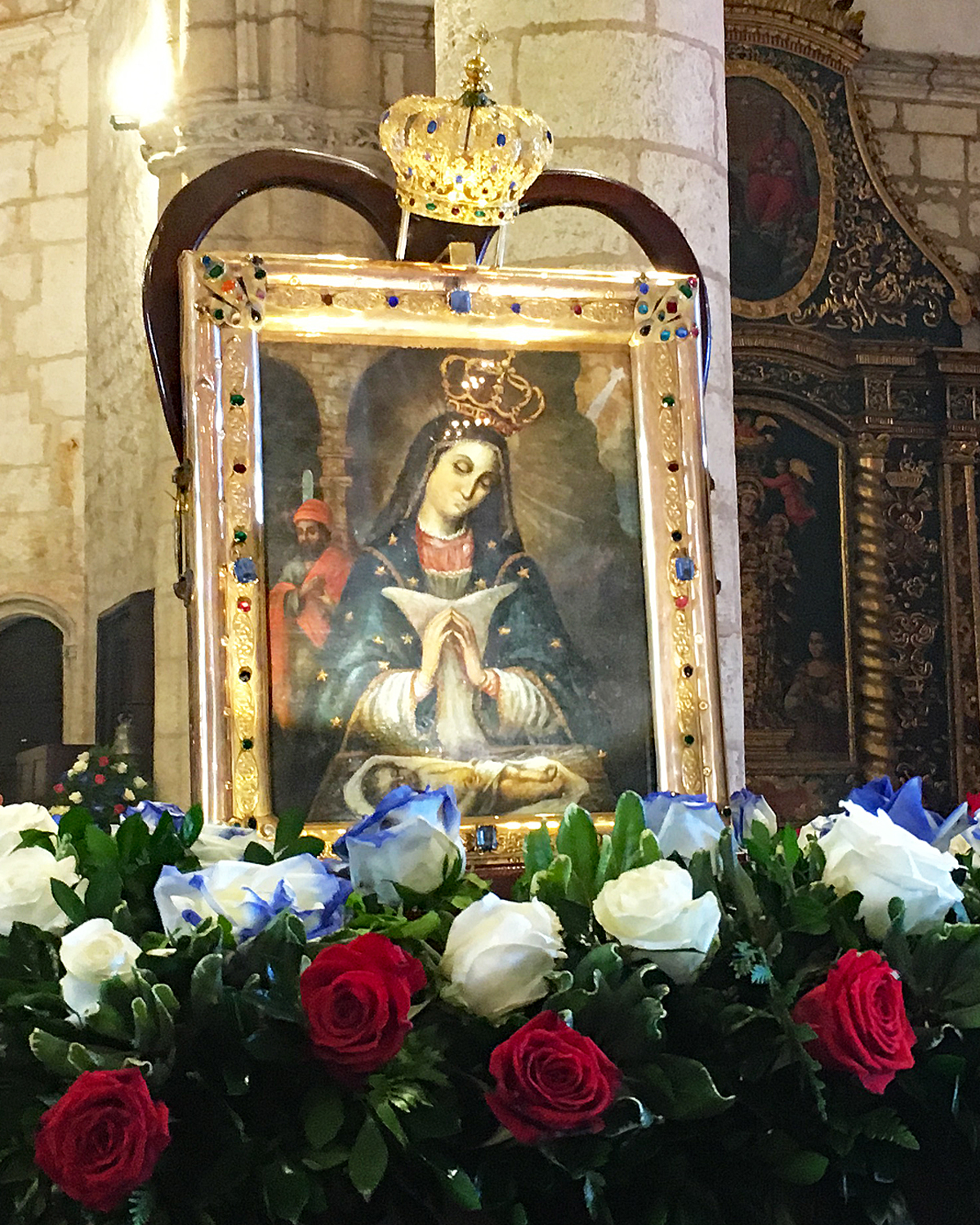
Nuestra Señora de la Altagracia, Catedral Primada de America

=== Description ===
The image is a painting on cloth, and is about thirteen inches by eighteen inches. It seems to have been painted by an unknown Spanish artist around the turn of the fourteenth century. It is set in an ornate frame made of gold, enamel, and precious stones. The frame was made by an unknown eighteenth-century artisan, and is considered one of the finest examples of Dominican goldwork. Restoration work was done in Spain in 1978 after centuries of exposure to candle smoke and handling.

The image depicts an infant Jesus, Mary and Joseph. It presents the scene of the Nativity of Jesus, with Jesus in the manger in Bethlehem. The maternity of the Virgin is emphasized. In the painting is the Star of Bethlehem, which has eight points and symbolizes heaven and has two rays extending towards the manger. Above the Virgin there are twelve stars, which represent the tribes of Israel and, at the same time, the Apostles in the New Testament. Around Mary there is a glow, corresponding to the description in Revelation 12:1.

La Altagracia wears a crown on her head because she is the Queen of Heaven, and a veil on her head because she is married to Joseph. She is dressed in red, white and blue. The red, according to the experts, she wears because she is a beautiful human being; the white because she is a woman conceived without sin; and the blue cloak because "the power of the Most High will come upon you" (cf. Luke 1:35) and because she is the queen of heaven. In front of the Mother is the Christ Child, naked, asleep on straw and well behind him is Saint Joseph, dressed in a red cape and with a candle in his left hand. The figure of Mary is posed in an attitude of adoration, with her hands joined in the form of an arch. On her chest there is a kind of white lightning in the shape of a triangle — an expression of the virgin birth of Jesus — that rises from the manger where the child sleeps almost to the shoulders of the Mother.

Mary's face is serene, with her eyes lowered, indicating neither seriousness nor sadness, but rather joy and peace, in an attitude of meditation. Her head is covered with a dark blue veil that reaches her shoulders and with a pearl crown, symbol of her status as queen, for being the Mother of the King and around twelve stars, which represent the Catholic Church, founded on the Twelve Apostles. Behind her stands out a great star, the same one that accompanied the Biblical Magi, to make the Savior known to them. Her mantle is dotted with sixteen small stars. Behind it there is a column, which means that the cave or manger of the birth is a temple because God himself, the baby Jesus, lives there.

== History ==
Brothers Alfonso and Antonio Trejo, from Plasencia, in Extremadura, Spain were two of the first European settlers to Santo Domingo. They had family in Garrovillas de Alconetar and were acquainted with the veneration of the image in a nearby monastery. The picture they brought to Hispaniola is of the Spanish school, painted c.1500. They brought the picture to the island some time prior to 1502 and eventually donated it to the parish church of San Dionisio at Higuey.

A 1650 account about the arrival of the Virgin in the colony by Canon Luis Gerónimo de Alcocer says:

The miraculous image of Our Lady of Altagracia is in the town of Higüey, about thirty leagues from the City of Santo Domingo;...it is clear that two noblemen from Pacencia in Extremadura brought her to this island, named Alonso and Antonio de Trejo who were among the first Christian settlers of this island, noble people as stated in a decree of King Don Felipe the First, year of 1506, in which he entrusts the Governor of this island to accommodate them.

== Legends or myths ==
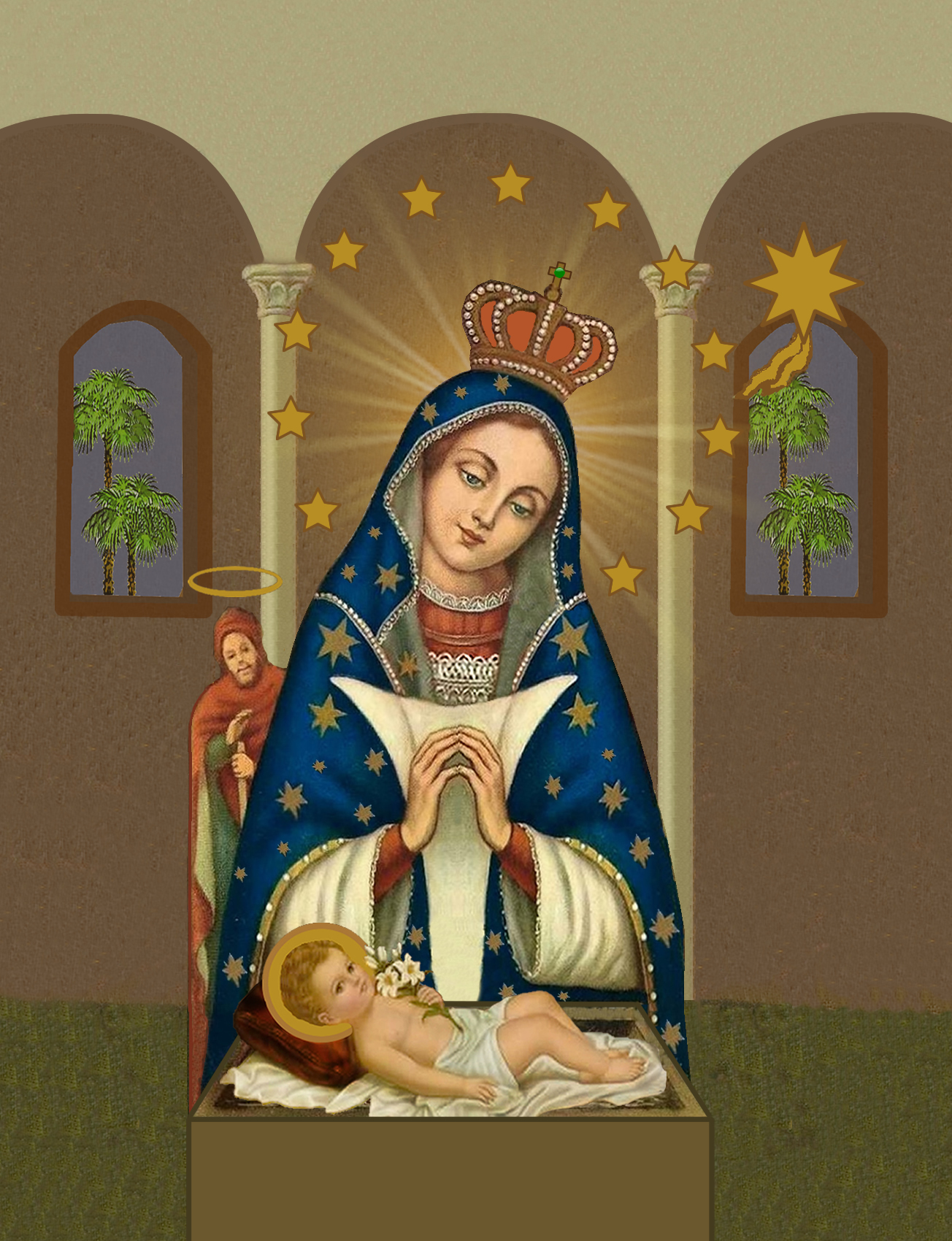
Devotional print

There are various legends about the origin of the Virgin of Altagracia in the Dominican Republic.

=== Estremadura ===
It was in Extremadura, in the town of Garrovillas de Alconetar, where the Virgin Mary was said to have appeared to a shepherd girl on top of a rock. The girl took the small image in her bag to a cabin, but the next morning the image had disappeared, reappearing in the same rock. The girl tried to take the image several times but the same thing always happened until the people of the place heard the story, and when they dug under the rock they found the image that is venerated today in the hermitage that they built in her honor.

=== The girl and the orange tree ===
Monsignor Juan Pepén in his book "Dónde floreció el naranjo" (Where the Orange Tree Bloomed), cites the testimony of Juan Elías Moscoso in 1907, who speaks of a Spanish colonist who lived in the Villa of Salvaleón de Higüey around 1500. He made a living by selling cattle, so he often traveled to the city of Santo Domingo. At least one account identifies the cattle dealer as one of the Trejo brothers.

According to Juan Pepén in his book "El Padre", on one of the man's trips to Santo Domingo, his two daughters asked him to bring back gifts: his eldest daughter asked him to buy her dresses, ribbons, and lace; by contrast, his youngest daughter only asked him to bring her the image of the "Virgin of Altagracia," since she had seen this Virgin in a dream. To everyone, this seemed strange, since no one had heard of such a Virgin. When the girls' father set out to return, he had gifts for the eldest daughter, but he was sorry for not having found the Virgin de la Altagracia for the younger girl, since even though he looked everywhere for the Virgin, he could not find her. He even went to ask the Canons of the Cabildo and the Archbishop himself, who answered that there was no such devotion.

Passing through the town of Los Dos Ríos, he stayed overnight at an inn, where he described the case of the unknown Virgin, expressing his sorrow at the prospect of returning home without item that his daughter had requested. An old man also staying there, heard the story and took from his bag a parchment of a painting of Altagracia. The old man gave him the painting, a beautiful image that showed Mary adoring a newborn who was at her feet in a cradle. When dawn arrived, the girl's father went looking for the old man, but the old man never appeared again.

Juan Pepén recounts that the girl met her father in the same place where the old sanctuary of Higüey is located today and that there, on January 21. At the foot of an orange tree, she showed the image to those present, establishing that day the venerated cult of the Virgin of Altagracia.

=== The Battle of Sabana, a.k.a. the Battle of Limonada ===
Some historians say that the official festival of Nuestra Señora de la Altagracia is on January 21 because on that day in 1691 the Battle of Sabana Real took place in the eastern part of the island of Santo Domingo, where the Spanish army, headed by Antonio Miniel, defeated the French army. The French had seized the island of Tortuga and in 1690 Santiago, causing the governor and captain Gral. Ignacio Caro to organize a column under the command of Francisco Segura y Sandoval. Military preparations were made in the Sabana Real, and using the element of surprise, the Spanish-Dominicans defeated the French. The Spanish fought from a disadvantaged position but triumphed regardless. The majority of those who made up the militias came from the areas of El Seybo and Higüey, and the faith they professed in the Virgin of Altagracia was present, since they were practitioners of the devotion to her. Before entering combat early in the morning, the Spanish-Dominicans implored the help of the Virgin of Mercy under the title of the Lady of Alta Gracia, so that by her grace she would help them to be victorious.

There is also a version that says that the Spanish asked the Virgin of Altagracia to help them win the battle. On January 21 they held a great religious festival for the veneration of Altagracia, although her festival should be on August 15, because on that date the image of Altagracia was taken to the colony. According to some historians, the Virgin first appeared in an event that occurred to a Spanish peasant from the autonomous community of Extremadura. The farmer said that he was walking through the forest when the Virgin Mary appeared to him at the height of the branches of a tree, hence her name "Lady of Altagracia" or "Virgin of Altagracia coming from the grace of the Lord". From there the people began to venerate her, as the mother of God. As of that date, the fervor of Dominican Christians for their mother spread throughout the island, as the numerous miracles that the Virgin of Altagracia performed on the island spread, thus beginning the tradition of the Dominican people to visit every 21 of January the basilica of Higüey, where her image is found.

== Official devotion ==
The date of January 21 was declared an official religious holiday by Archbishop Isidoro Rodríguez Lorenzo, who, in 1692, designated the date as a religious holiday, approving as good and valid the feast on January 21. However, it was during the leadership of Monsignor Arturo de Meriño, Archbishop of Santo Domingo, that the Holy See was asked to grant a Divine Office and designated Mass for the day of the Virgin of the Altagracia. The authorities were begged, in addition, that a mandatory holiday be established on January 21; the date of August 15 might have been chosen, except that it was already the Catholic feast of the Assumption of Mary. In the Dominican Republic, the official declaration of January 21 as a non-working day, a national and religious holiday throughout the country, was approved by law. This was executed during the government of Horacio Vásquez, who was a devotee of the Virgin.

== Honors to the Virgin of Altagracia ==
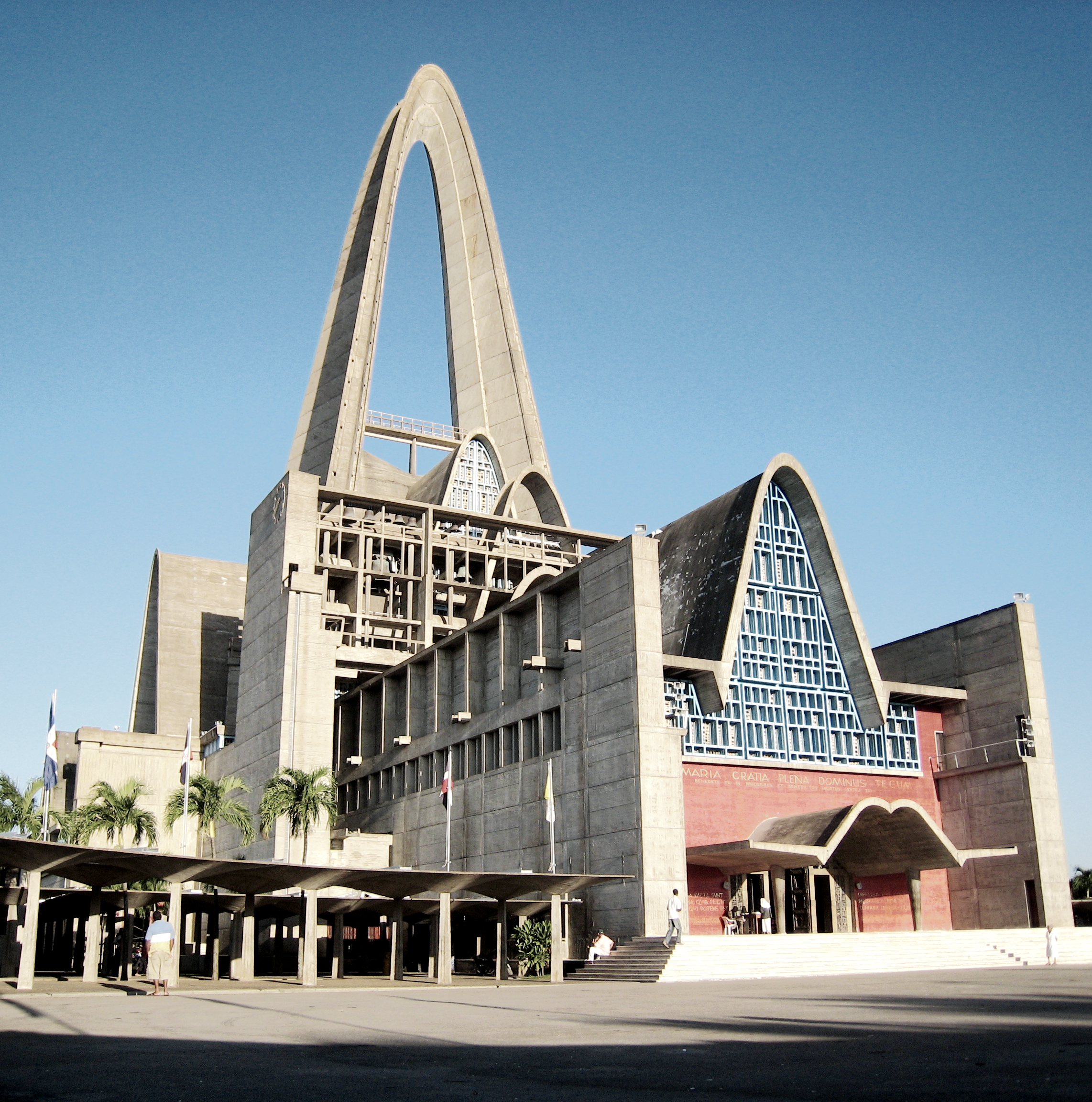
Basílica Catedral Nuestra Señora de la Altagracia

The pilgrimage and celebration of the festival of Nuestra Señora de la Altagracia dates from the colonial period . In the 20th century, Our Lady of Altagracia was crowned twice: during the pontificate of the pope Pius XI and personally by the pope John Paul II. Her first coronation was on August 15, 1922, at the Puerta del Conde. Having previously obtained the permission of the Pope Benedict XV on behalf of Mons. Adolfo Alejandro Nouel, it was the newly elected pope Pius XI who sent as his representative Archbishop Sebastián Leite de Vasconcellos, titular archbishop of Damietta, Roman count and eminent figure of the Portuguese episcopate. For the occasion, the image that was transferred from the sanctuary of San Dionisio was framed in gold and adorned with precious stones and crowned with a crown made in the goldsmith's workshop of José Oliva, modeled by the great Dominican artist Abelardo Rodríguez Urdaneta. In 1924 Congress decreed the celebration of Our Lady of Altagracia as a national holiday on January 21. On October 31, 1927, Pope Pius XI declared it a holiday of the Church, through an apostolic brief. During the first visit of Pope John Paul II on January 25, 1979, he blessed the Sanctuary of Altagracia (today Basilica of Higüey, Basílica Catedral Nuestra Señora de la Altagracia) and on October 12, 1992, on his second visit to the country, John Paul II personally crowned the image of the Virgen de la Altagracia with a gilded silver diadem. On August 15, 2022, she was presented with a golden rose sent by Pope Francis at the closing celebrations of the centenary of her canonical coronation.

== The devotion of Altagracia ==
The devotion to Nuestra Señora de la Altagracia began in Higüey and spread over the years until it became national and became part of the Dominican identity. This devotion manifests itself as the main pilgrimage of the town.

According to the Dominican historian Alejandro Paulino Ramos, Altagracian devotion began in the mid-16th century in Hispaniola, both in the area of Santo Domingo and in the then town of Higüey.

The historian highlights the fact that the main day of her devotion was August 15 at that time, because on that date the image of Altagracia was brought to the island and that it should be celebrated in the city of the East because, according to the traditions, it was the place where God wanted her to be, although others affirm that it was the place where the Trejos brothers established themselves since their arrival on the island. According to Bishop Ramón Benito, it is the story about the Trejo brothers that seems the most logical because, “they come from Extremadura; there the Altagracia is popular; It is known that when leaving the homeland each one took with him the devotion to his region; These two brothers settled in Higüey on the Island of Hispanola; there they took the image of the Virgin of their devotion.”

== Places devoted to her as patron saint ==
Argentina

- In the city of Alta Gracia, of Córdoba Province, Argentina, Argentina, the Virgin of Altagracia is the origin of the name of the city.

Spain

- She is patron of Garrovillas de Alconétar, Province of Cáceres y Siruela, Province of Badajoz.

Panama

- Patron of the community of Jobo Dulce, Los Santos Province, Panamá.

Dominican Republic

- Patron of La Altagracia Province, Dominican Republic.
- Patron of the parish in Loma de Cabrera, Dominican Republic.
- Patron of the municipality of Castañuelas, Montecristi, República Dominicana.
- Patron of the municipality of Villa Altagracia, Dominican Republic.

Venezuela

- Altagracia de Orituco: This Venezuelan city has celebrated festivities to the Virgin of Altagracia since the year 1705.
- Los Puertos de Altagracia, a city that takes its name from the Virgin.
- Patron of Curiepe, State of Miranda
- Patron of Quíbor and of Jimenez Municipality in Lara (state), where a procession occurs with a canvas that dates from 1605. This canvas was painted by Tomas de Cosas.

Peru

- Patron of the city of Huamachuco, located in the province of Sánchez Carrión in the department of La Libertad.
- Patron of the city of Ayaviri, Melgar, located in the province of Melgar in the department of Puno.

Mexico

- Patron of the community of Altagracia, Zapopan, México.

== Online resources ==
- Corazones.org
- Vicente Noble.org
- Rincón Dominicano
- Usuarios.lycos.es
- Alkonetara Garrovillas
- Dominikano.com
