= Diocese of Nuestra Señora de la Altagracia in Higüey =

Latin Catholic jurisdiction in the Dominican Republic

Diocese of Nuestra Señora de la Altagracia en Higüey Dioecesis Higueyensis
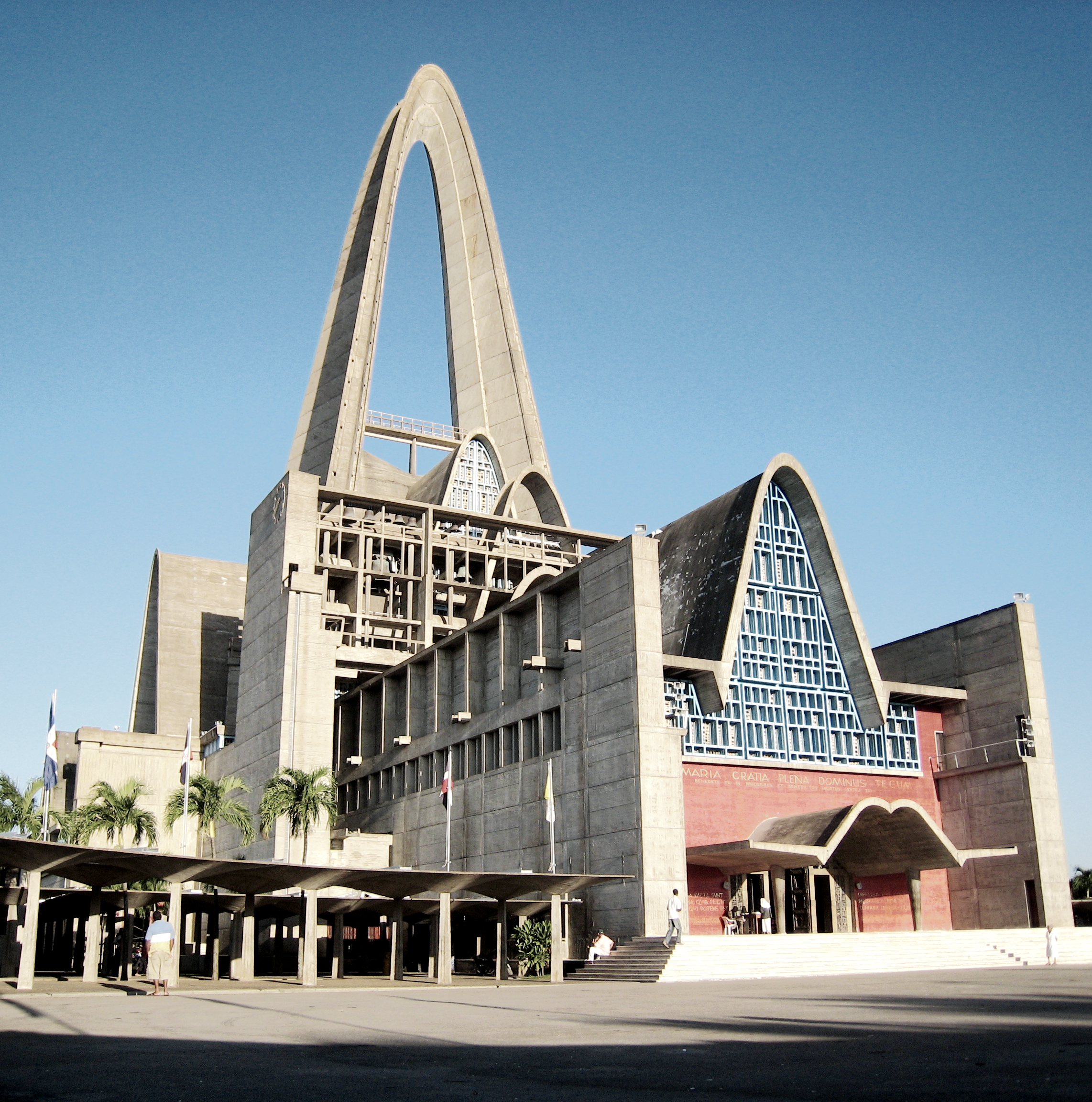
- Basílica Catedral Nuestra Señora de la Altagracia

Location
- Country: Dominican Republic
- Ecclesiastical province: Santo Domingo
- Metropolitan: Higüey

Statistics
- Area: 5,437 km^{2} (2,099 sq mi)
- Population: Total; Catholics: (as of 2004); 535,400; 457,100 (85.4%)
- Parishes: 22

Information
- Denomination: Catholic Church
- Sui iuris church: Latin Church
- Rite: Roman Rite
- Established: 1 April 1959 (66 years ago)
- Cathedral: Basílica Catedral Nuestra Señora de la Altagracia

Current leadership
- Pope: Leo XIV
- Bishop: Jesús Castro Marte
- Bishops emeritus: Gregorio Nicanor Peña Rodríguez

Map

The Diocese of Nuestra Señora de la Altagracia en Higüey (Latin: Dioecesis Higueyensis) (erected 1 April 1959) is a Latin Church ecclesiastical jurisdiction or diocese of the Catholic Church in the Dominican Republic. It is a suffragan diocese in the ecclesiastical province of the metropolitan Archdiocese of Santo Domingo.

== History ==
- 1 April 1959: created from territory of the Archdiocese of Santo Domingo
- 1 February 1997: lost territory as did the Archdiocese of Santiago de los Caballeros to create the Diocese of San Pedro de Macorís

== Bishops ==
=== Ordinaries ===
- Juan Félix Pepén y Soliman † (1959 - 1975), became emeritus
- Hugo Eduardo Polanco Brito † (1975 - 1995), Archbishop (personal title), became emeritus
- Ramón Benito de La Rosa y Carpio (1995 - 2003), appointed Archbishop of Santiago de los Caballeros
- Gregorio Nicanor Peña Rodríguez (2004 - 2020), became emeritus
- Jesús Castro Marte (2020 - )

=== Other priest of this diocese who became bishop ===
- Pablo Cedano Cedano †, appointed Auxiliary Bishop of Santo Domingo in 1996
