= Djebel Oust =

Coordinates: 36°33′N 10°04′E

Djebel Oust جبل الوسط
- Commune and town
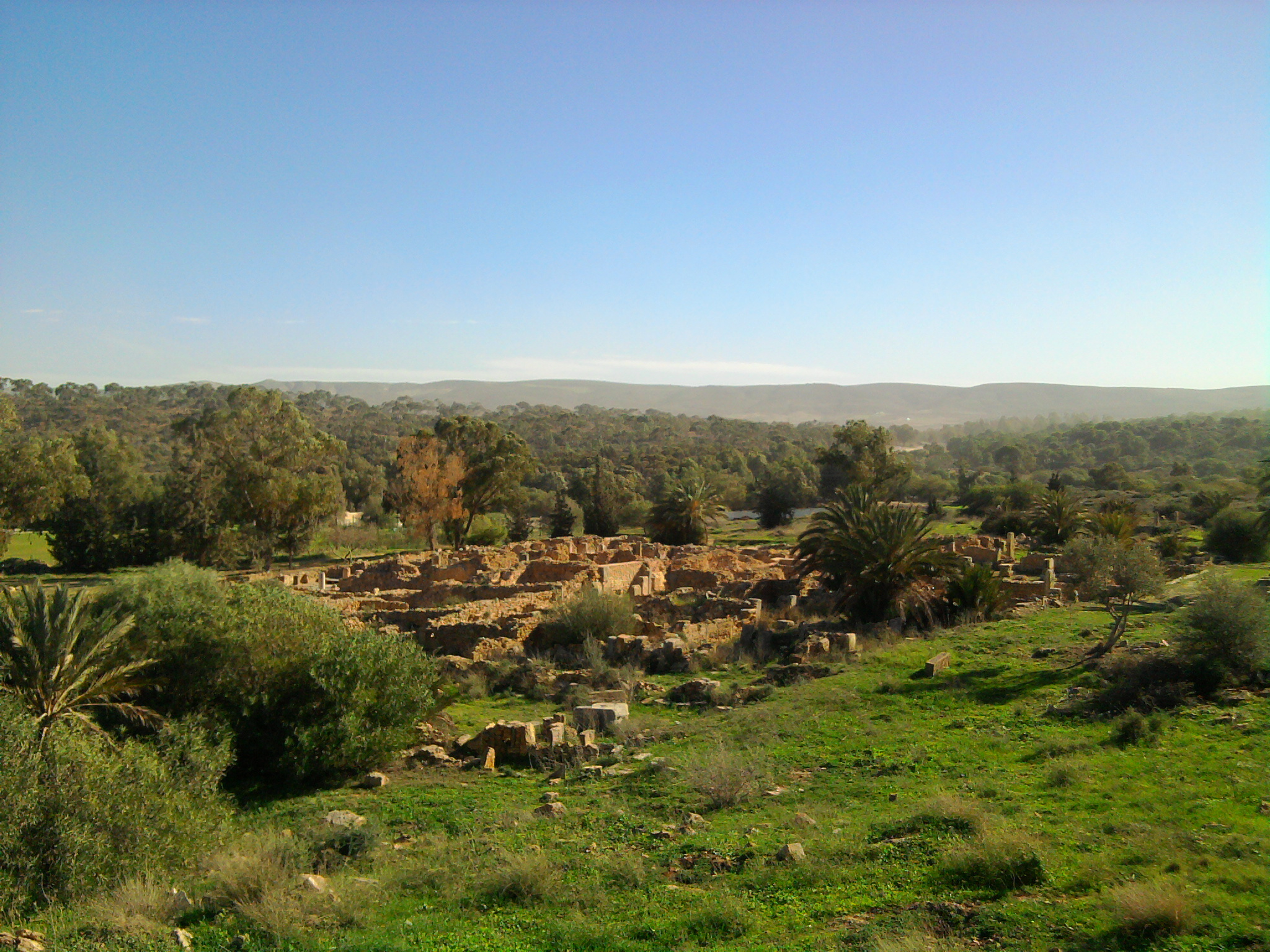
- Tunisie Djebel oust.
- Interactive map of Djebel Oust
- Country: Tunisia
- Governorate: Zaghouan Governorate
- Time zone: UTC+1 (CET)

Djebel Oust is a town and commune in the Zaghouan Governorate, Tunisia. As of 2004 it had a population of 3,830.

The city is participating in the loosening of the industrial activities of the capital, notably because of its situation on the RN3. With Bir Mcherga, it hosts one of the three important industrial zones of the governorate on more than 200 hectares including a very important cement plant.

The city is best known for its hot water source since ancient times. If it emerged from the eastern flank of the mountain, it is now pumped 100 meters deep. A spa has been created to exploit the properties of this chloro-sulfated water of 54 °C.

An ancient city was discovered, located halfway between the cities of Thuburbo Majus and Oudna. A sanctuary, thermal baths, cisterns and a residence attached to the thermal baths have been uncovered. A Franco-Tunisian archaeological mission has been in charge since 2000 to study the site.

== See also ==
- List of cities in Tunisia
