= Zaghouan Governorate =

Governorate of Tunisia

Zaghouan ولاية زغوان
- Governorate
- Map of Tunisia with Zaghouan highlighted

- Subdivisions of Zaghouan Governorate
- Coordinates: 36°24′N 10°09′E
- Country: Tunisia
- Created: November 1976
- Capital: Zaghouan

Government
  - Governor: Karim Beranji (since 2024)

Area
  - Total: 2,768 km^{2} (1,069 sq mi)
  - Rank: Ranked 18th of 24

Population (2014)
  - Total: 176,945
  - Rank: Ranked 21st of 24
  - Density: 63.93/km^{2} (165.6/sq mi)
- Time zone: UTC+01 (CET)
- Postal prefix: xx
- ISO 3166 code: TN-22

Zaghouan Governorate (Arabic: ولاية زغوان Wilāyat Zaghwān pronounced [zɑʁˈwe̞ːn]; French: Gouvernorat de Zaghouan) is one of the twenty-four governorates (provinces) of Tunisia and is in north-eastern Tunisia. It covers an area of 2,768 square kilometres (1,069 sq mi) and its population was 176,945 at the 2014 census. The capital is the town of Zaghouan. The governorate is traditionally agricultural but has recently undergone a movement towards industrialization. The working population is concentrated mainly in the agricultural sector (33.3%), services (17.9%), and manufacturing (16%). There are 150 industrial companies and 63 foreign companies, including 43 wholly exporting units.

== Geography ==
The area is roughly circular and lies above the low coastal plains; it has a summit of 1,295 metres (4,249 ft) close to its centrally located capital on the west side of the founding city. The summit sits on one of two north-east to south-west escarpments forming part of the dorsal Atlas Mountains commencing here close to the east coast and Tunisia's capital city, Tunis. The Oued Mellane drains the west and north of the province, having risen in the province to the south-west Siliana and then discharging into the Gulf of Tunis in the southern contiguous districts to the capital city, in particular flowing through Ben Arous the governorate of which takes in land immediately due south of the city centre. As such Zaghouan has no coastline, however its climate remains warm Mediterranean, with significant winter and early spring rainfall. The main road from Tunis to the city of Kairouan, inland from Sousse, passes through the town of El Fahs in the west of the province. A railway passes through the same city leading to the mid-west of the country, which is in turn is connected back to the east coast.

== Administrative divisions ==
The governorate is divided into six delegations (mutamadiyat), listed below with their populations at the 2004 and 2014 Censuses:

| Delegation | Area in km^{2} | Population 2004 Census | Population 2014 Census |
|---|---|---|---|
| Bir Mcherga | 536 | 21,508 | 24,387 |
| El Fahs | 936 | 43,678 | 46,449 |
| Nadhour | 357 | 28,550 | 30,366 |
| Saouaf | 253 | 12,095 | 12,681 |
| Zaghouan | 409 | 34,367 | 38,445 |
| Ez-Zeriba | 348 | 20,765 | 24,617 |

Six municipalities are in Zaghouan Governorate:

| 1611 | Zaghouan | 43,813 |
| 1612 | Zriba | 27,849 |
| 1613 | Bir Mcherga | 16,284 |
| 1614 | Djebel Oust | 10,999 |
| 1615 | El Fahs | 37,652 |
| 1616 | Nadhour | 37,130 |
| | El Amaiem | 13,562 |
| | Saouaf | 13,776 |
