= Basilica-Cathedral of Our Lady of Altagracia =

Roman Catholic minor basilica and cathedral in the Dominican Republic

- Basílica Catedral Nuestra Señora de la Altagracia
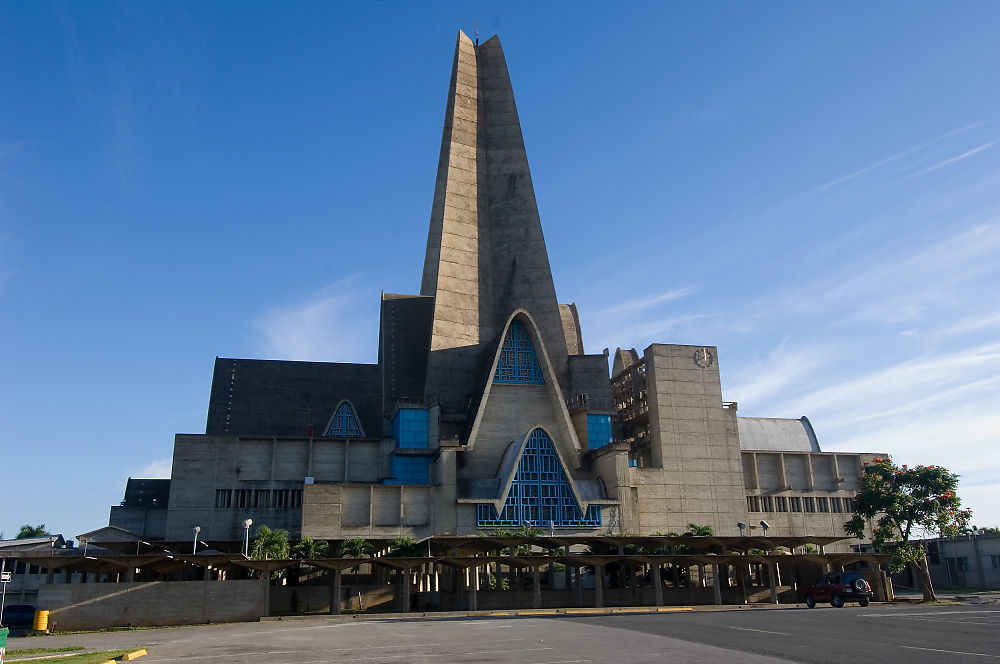
- Basílica Catedral Nuestra Señora de la Altagracia

Religion
- Affiliation: Roman Catholic
- Diocese: Diocese of Nuestra Señora de la Altagracia in Higüey
- Ecclesiastical or organisational status: Minor basilica

Location
- Location: Higüey, Dominican Republic
- Interactive map of Basilica-Cathedral of Our Lady of Altagracia
- Coordinates: 18°36′58″N 68°43′01″W

Architecture
- Type: Church
- Style: Modern
- Groundbreaking: 1954
- Completed: 1970

The Basilica-Cathedral of Our Lady of Altagracia (Spanish: Basílica Catedral Nuestra Señora de la Altagracia) is a Roman Catholic minor basilica and cathedral in the Dominican Republic dedicated to Our Lady of Altagracia, patroness of the nation. It is in Salvaleón de Higüey. The basilica is the seat of the Roman Catholic Diocese of Nuestra Señora de la Altagracia in Higüey.

The interior was completed in 1971. The cathedral was raised to the honor of a minor basilica by Pope Paul VI on December 17, 1970. It was visited by Pope John Paul II during his visit to the country in 1992. It also appears on the reverse of the Dominican Republic's 50-peso note.

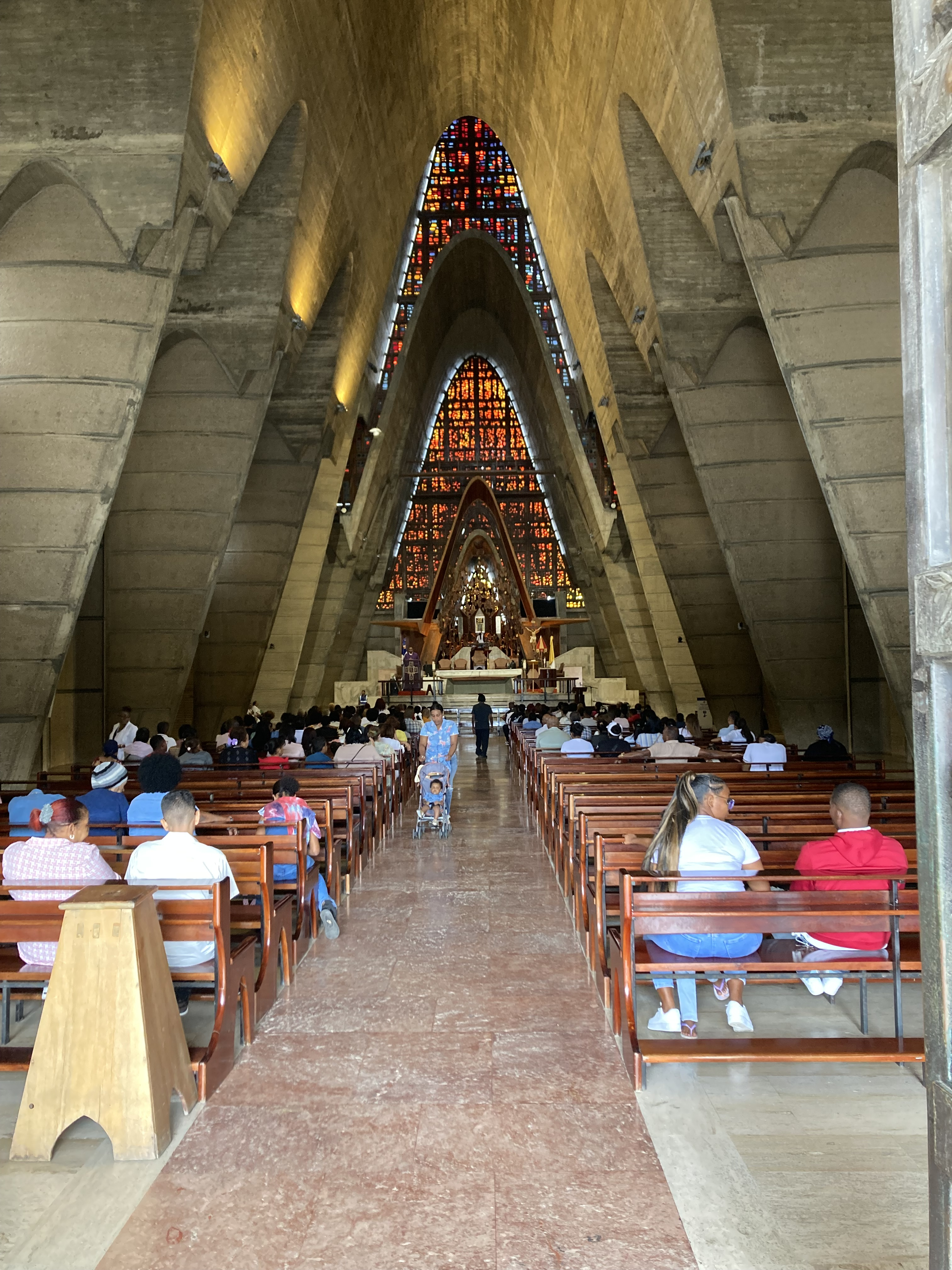
Interior of the Higuey Basilica

Among many legends, one stands out. A long time ago a young girl from Salvaleón de Higüey asked her father for a portrait of the Virgin Mary. Her father (name unknown) brought the picture as gift for her. It is believed that the portrait was placed at the house of this girl. For some reason, at the break of dawn of each day, the portrait was always found outside the house, beneath a small tree. Every day this portrait was moved back inside by the girl, until she told her parents about it. The place became sacred, and the basilica was built on that same spot as reference of Mary's grace. The painting has been on display since 1571 and it was brought to the basilica in 1970. More than 800,000 visit the Basilica to see the image of Our Lady of Altagracia each year.

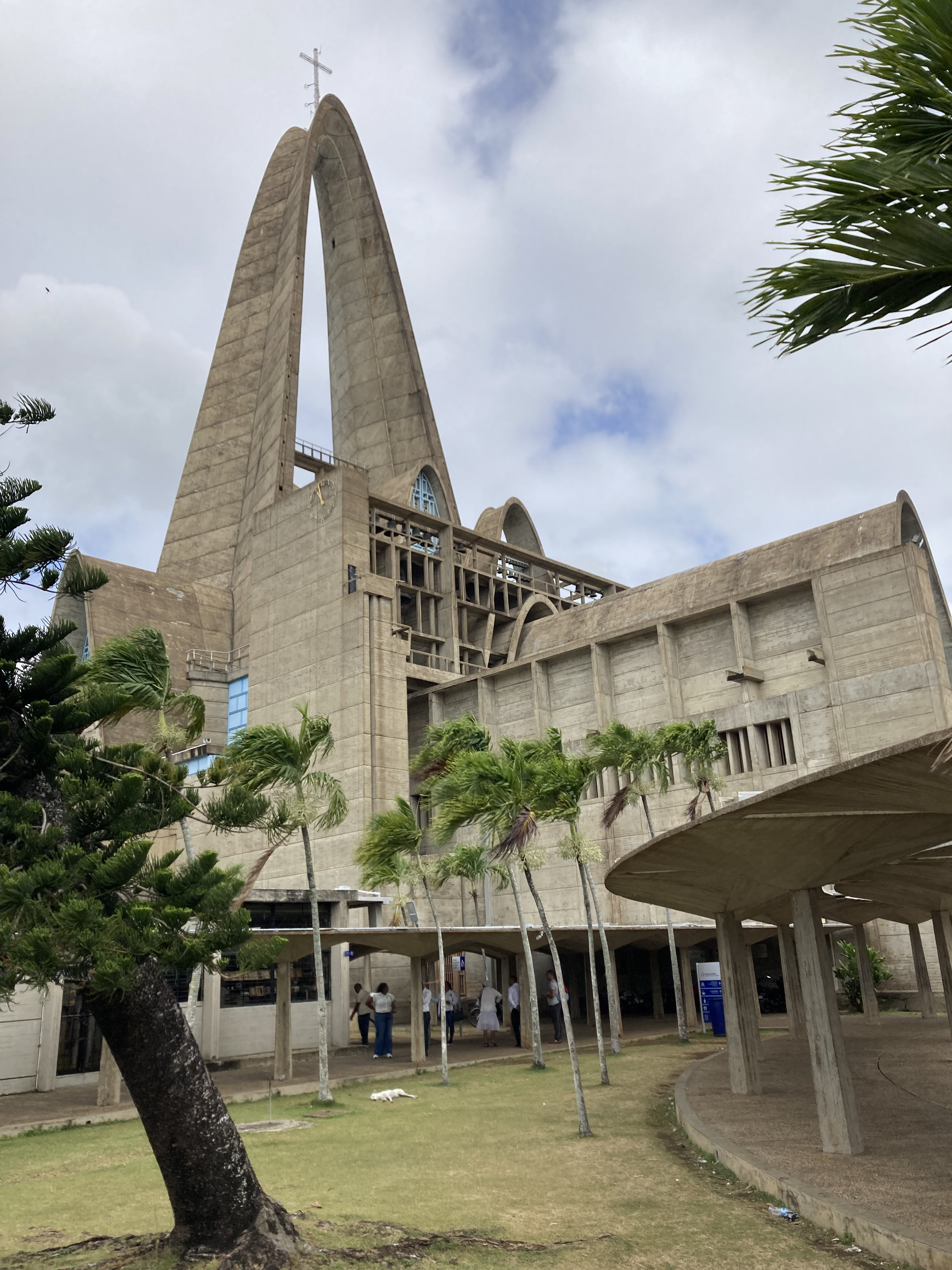
Side view of the Higuey Basilica, bells can be seen

The Feast of Our Lady of Altagracia is celebrated as a national holiday on January 21; depending on the day of the week it can be on the Friday before or the Monday after. The feast day was originally held on August 15 (Assumption of Mary) but was moved to January 21 to celebrate a victory over the French in 1690.

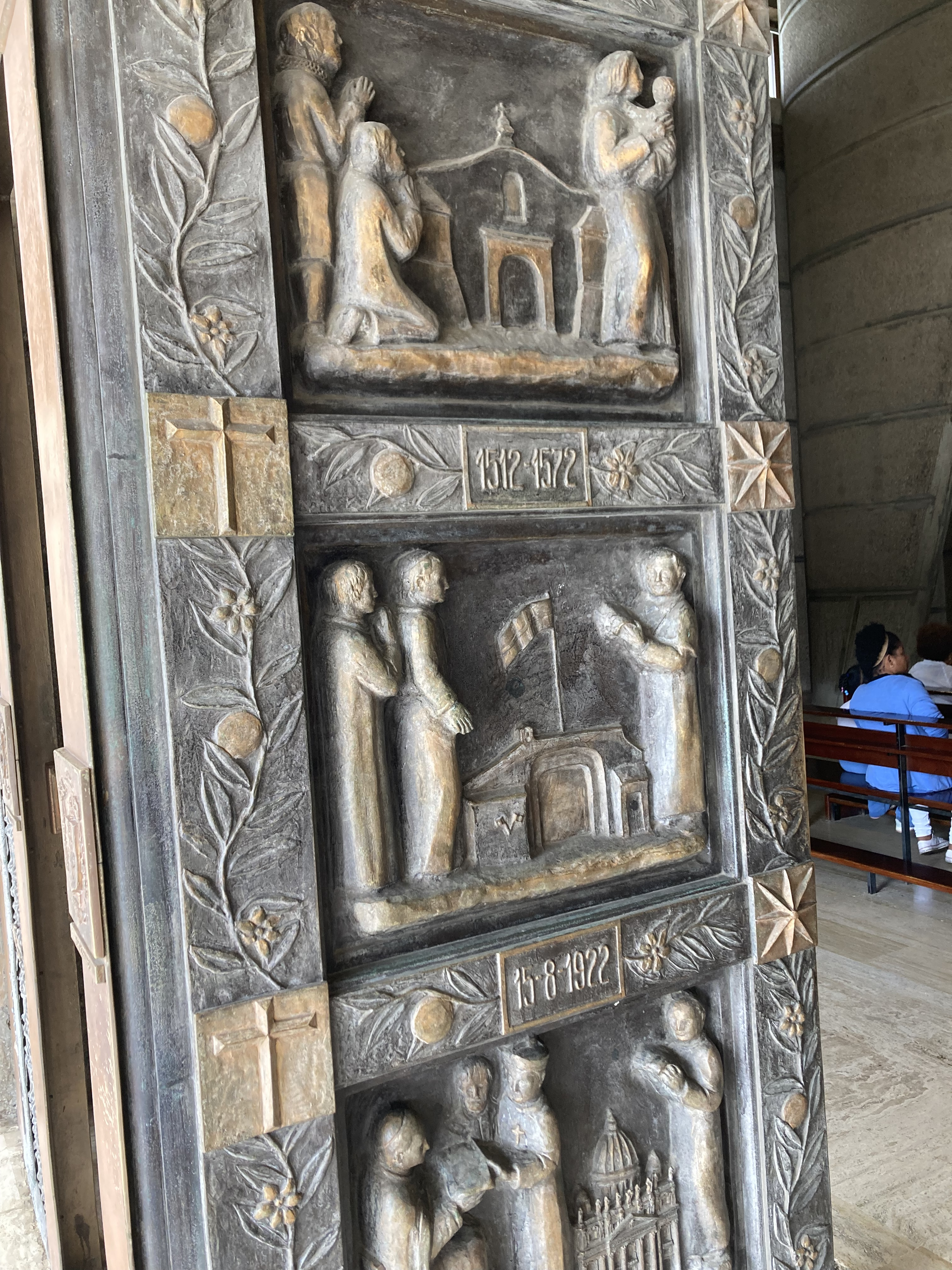
One of the doors to the Higuey Basilica

== See also ==
- Nine Years' War
- Virgin of Mercy
