= Oued el Melah =

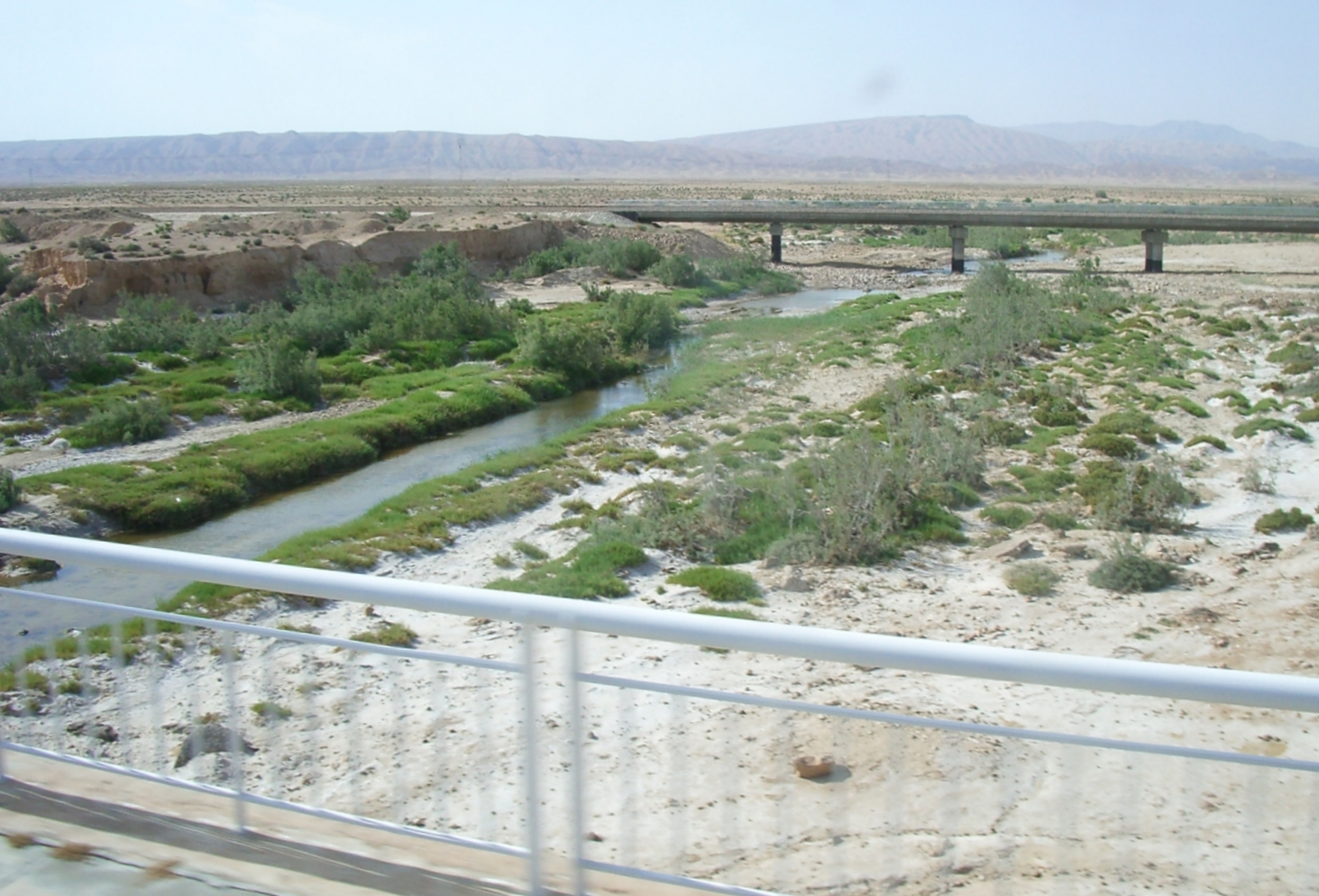
Oued melah.

Oued el Melah or Wadi el Melah (Arabic: وادي مالح, وادي المالح, "Salty Wadi") is an intermittent wadi of Tunisia whose course is located on the territory of the governorates of Gafsa and Tozeur. Generally dry, except when it rains, the wadi has its mouth in Chott el-Gharsa.

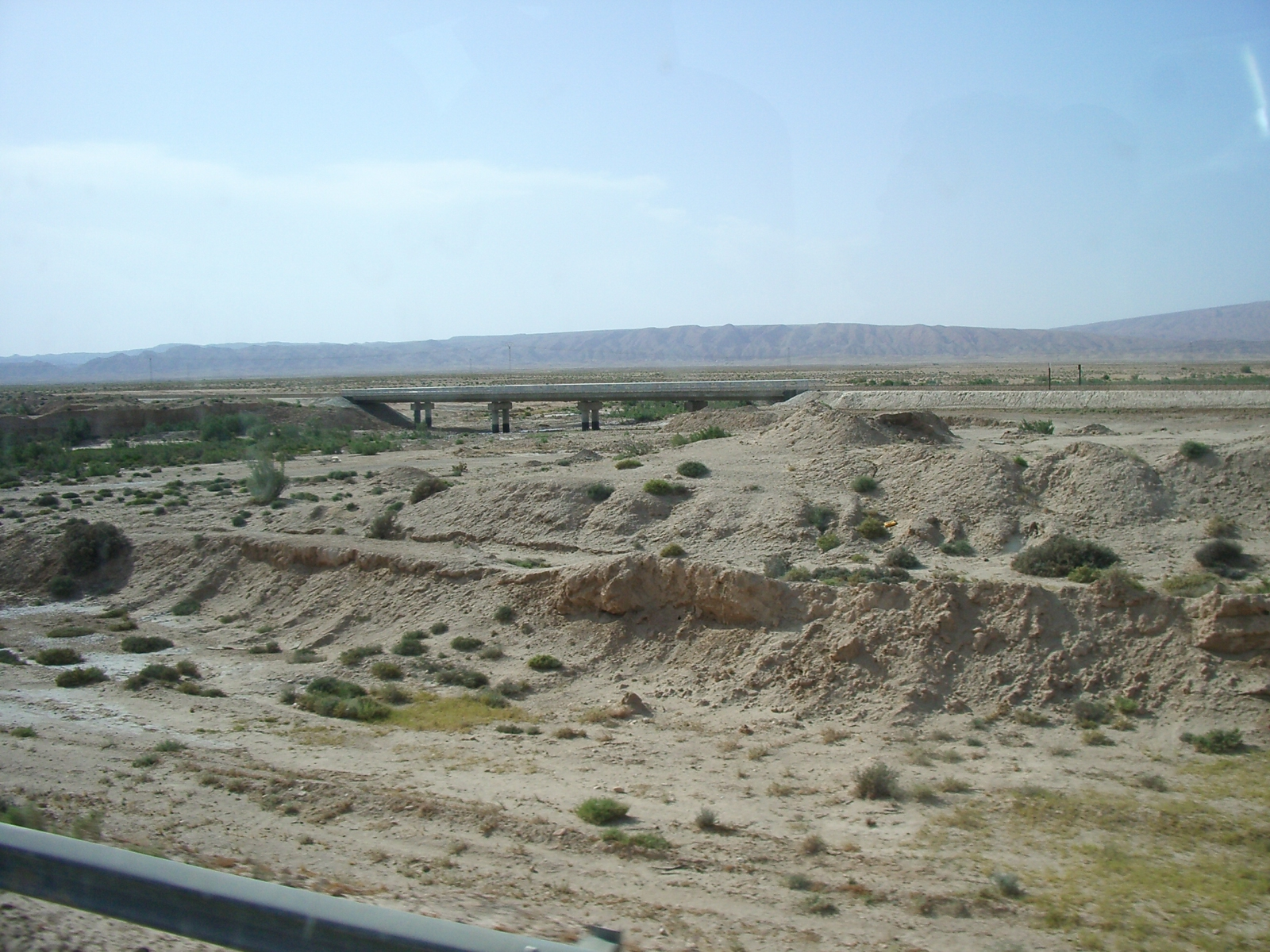
Oued el Melah in July 2007 with the railway bridge

It is almost a river for a series of wadis in the area between Gafsa and Tozeur, forming a waterway for a distance of 70 kilometers. The decrease in precipitation in the area means that it does not carry water any more, except in the case of rain, usually occurring during the fall and winter.

The towns of Lalla, El Ksar and Guettaria are on the river.
