= Fabio Mamerto Rivas Santos =

Dominican Roman Catholic prelate

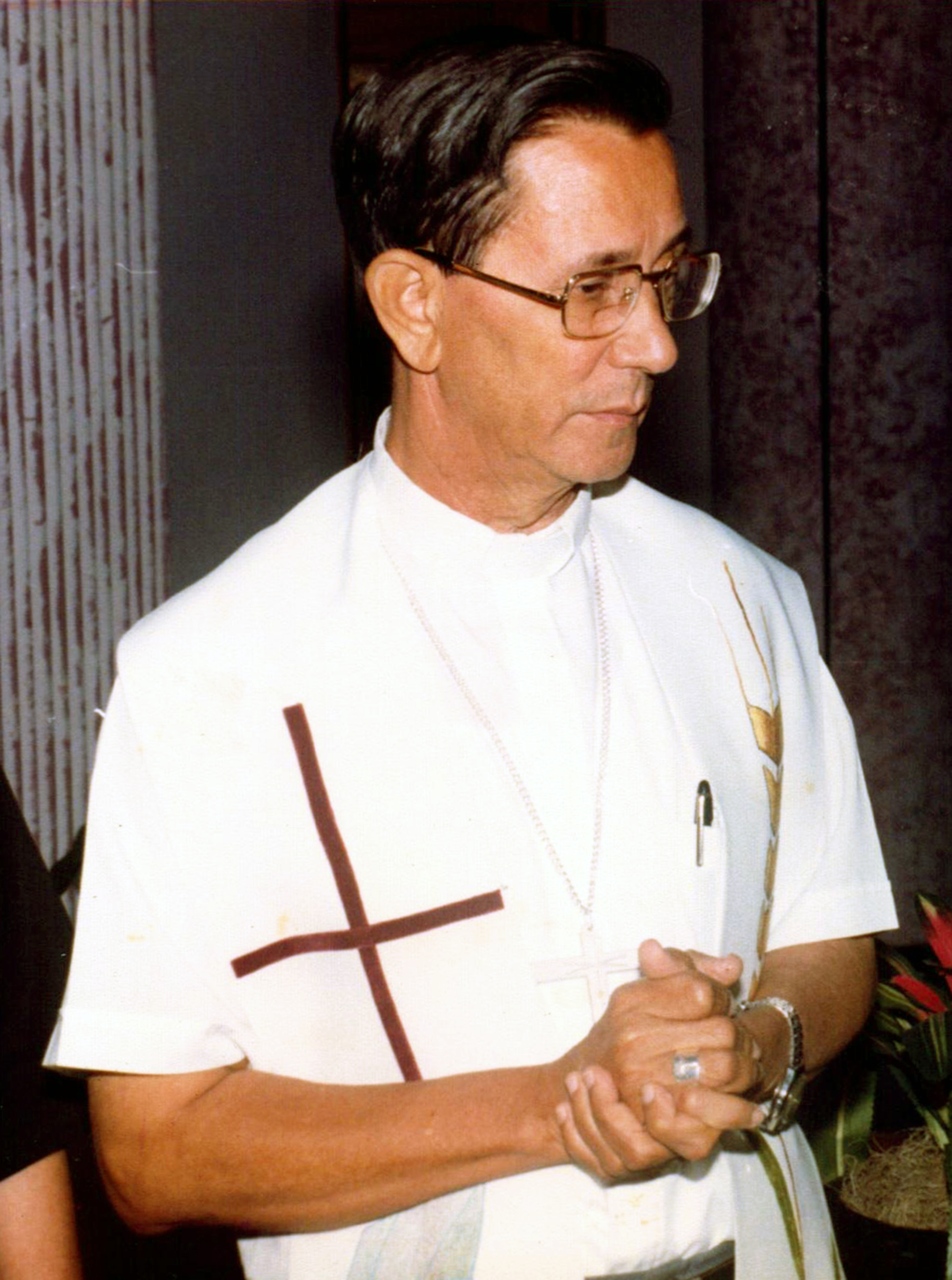
Fabio Mamerto Rivas Santos

Fabio Mamerto Rivas Santos (11 May 1932 – 11 August 2018) was a Dominican Roman Catholic prelate.

Born in Cabirmota, La Vega, Rivas Santos was ordained to the priesthood in 1965. He served as the Bishop of Barahona from 1976 until his resignation in 1999. He died on 11 August 2018 in Jarabacoa, at the age of 86.
