= Oued Siliana =

River in Tunisia

Coordinates: 36°33′N 9°25′E

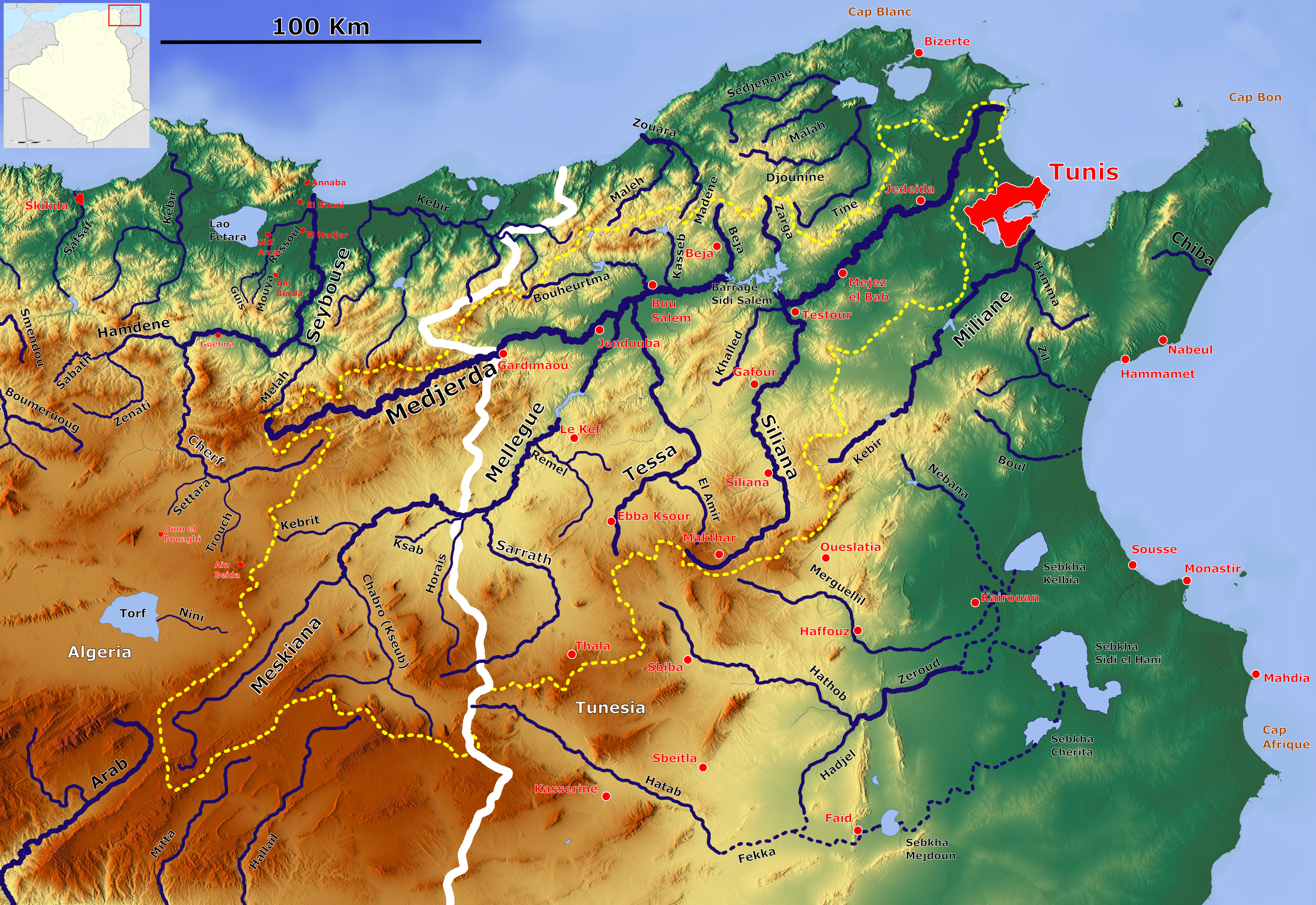
The Medjerda catchment area with the Oued Siliana (right center)

El Oued Siliana is a river of Tunisia in the region arising from Maktar, which runs north and drains into the river Medjerda about 5 km west of Testour.

On his way to collect the rainy season, water numerous wadis that are dry much of the year. Its course is about 120 km. the average rainfall is 455 mm / year between September and January grew between 15 and 11 percent. The city's main course is still Gaâfour and Siliana. The course begins wadis are controlled by the dam of El Akhmim; above of Siliana Siliana and the reservoir; and on the left side near the mouth is the Sidi Salem Reservoir. The river crosses between different altitude regions clothes Yahia OLED 584 meters and 1347 meters in Jebel Serj an average difference of 400 meters and different rainfall (a difference of 150 mm / year).
