= Saouaf =

Saouaf صواف
- Commune and town
- Location in Tunisia
- Coordinates: 36°13′39″N 10°10′17″E
- Country: Tunisia
- Governorate: Zaghouan Governorate
- Time zone: UTC1

Saouaf (Arabic: صواف) is a small town located in the southern part of Zaghouan Governorate, Tunisia, about 26 km (16 mi) in a straight line south of the city of Zaghouan.
