= Gara M'hamed Ali =

Hill in Taţāwīn, Tunisia

Coordinates: 31.5638°N 9.7843°E

Gara M'hamed Ali is a hill in Taţāwīn, Tunisia.
