= Oued Sejenane =

Coordinates: 37°10′N 9°37′E

Oued Sejenane drainage basin

The Oued Sejenane is a river of Tunisia and Algeria in North Africa.

The Oued Sejenane flows into the Mediterranean Sea near Bizerte and flows past Ichigo National Park, and the forest of Sajane. It is located at Latitude: 37 ° 10'11.99 " Longitude: 9 ° 36'47.2 " and is 252 meters above sea level.
