= List of Catholic churches in Tunisia =

This is a list of Catholic churches in Tunisia. The churches are mentioned in the modus vivendi signed between Vatican and the Tunisian government on 10 July 1956.

Church	Location	Building date	Nowadays use	Image	Map reference
Église d'Aïn Draham	Aïn Draham	1931	Abandoned		36°46′37.98″N 8°41′27.99″E
Aïn el-Asker church	Aïn el-Asker				
Église Sainte-Thérèse de l'Enfant-Jésus d'El Aouina	Tunis	1932	Sports hall (boxing)		36°51′11″N 10°15′27″E
Ariana Governorate church	Ariana Governorate	1955	Governorate offices		36°51′13.5″N 10°11′22.9″E
El Aroussa Church	El Aroussa	1953	Library		36°22′49.71″N 9°27′12.77″E
Église Sainte-Monique du Bardo	Le Bardo	1921	Sport club offices		36°48′36.76″N 10°8′18.75″E
Église Notre-Dame-du-Travail de Bellevue	El Ouardia	1926	Municipality headquarters		36°46′49″N 10°11′35″E
Église Notre-Dame-du-Rosaire de Béja	Béja	1938	Cultural complex		36°46′49″N 10°11′35″E
Ben Arous church	Ben Arous	1946	Local association		36°45′30.5″N 10°13′21.1″E
Bessbassia church	Hammamet	1924	Destroyed		
Église Saint-Joseph de Bir Halima	Bir Halima	1909	Abandoned		36°23′44.42″N 10°2′48.65″E
Église Sainte-Thérèse de l'Enfant Jésus de Bir Mcherga	Bir Mcherga	1954	Youth house		36°31′1.66″N 9°57′20.74″E
Église Notre-Dame de France de Bizerte	Bizerte	1953	Cultural complex		37°16′17″N 9°52′26″E
Bou Arada church	Bou Arada	1932	Destroyed		36°21′12.1″N 9°37′34.3″E
Bouficha church	Bouficha				
Bradahi church	Mornag				
Acropolium of Carthage	Carthage (municipality)	1890	Cultural complex		36°51′13″N 10°19′24″E
Chapelle Sainte-Monique de Carthage	Carthage (municipality)	1896	Conference room		36°51′43.71″N 10°20′18.82″E
Église de La Cebala du Mornag	Mornag	1911	Cultural complex		36°40′44.45″N 10°17′15.73″E
Chaouat church	Djedeida				
Chassart Tefaha church	Ariana Governorate				
Chebbaou church	La Manouba				
Djedeida church	Djedeida				
Église Saint-Joseph de Djerba	Houmt Souk	1848	Catholic church		33°52′42″N 10°51′29″E
Église d'Ebba Ksour	Dahmani	1954	House		35°56′25.95″N 8°49′42.23″E
Ezzahra church (Saint-Germain)	Ezzahra		Destroyed		36°44′54.7″N 10°18′37.62″E
Église Sainte-Thérèse de l'Enfant Jésus de Ferryville	Menzel Bourguiba	1908	Library		37°9′29″N 9°47′37″E
Fondouk Hafayedh church	Nabeul	1903	Abandoned		36°30′8.3″N 10°34′27.3″E
Fondouk Jedid church	Nabeul				
Franceville church	El Omrane	1949	Theater		36°48′52.6″N 10°09′59.2″E
Église Sainte-Anne de Gaâfour	Gaâfour	1920	Abandoned		36°19′28″N 9°19′30″E
Église de Gabès	Gabès	1911	Abandoned		33°53′17″N 10°6′20″E
Église de La Galite	La Galite	1923	Ruins		37°31′27.63″N 8°56′37.34″E
Église du Sacré-Cœur de Ghardimaou	Ghardimaou	1904	Youth house		36°26′49.44″N 8°26′19.42″E
Église de Goubellat	Goubellat	1955	Municipality headquarter		36°32′23.46″N 9°39′50.82″E
Église Saint-Augustin-et-Saint-Fidèle de La Goulette	La Goulette	1872	Catholic church		36°48′58″N 10°18′5″E
Grombalia church	Grombalia	1948	destroyed		36°35′58.1″N 10°29′45.9″E
Haffouz church (Pichon)	Haffouz	1911	Cultural complex		
Église Sainte-Marie de Hammam Lif	Hammam Lif	1896	Political party headquarter		36°43′49″N 10°20′19″E
Église du Bienheureux Antoine Neyrot d'Hammamet	Hammamet	1909	Destroyed		36°23′48″N 10°36′50″E
Église de l'Immaculée Conception de Kairouan	Kairouan	1913	Destroyed		35°40′23″N 10°6′10″E
Kalaat Senan church	Kalaat Senan				35°46′1.75″N 8°20′29.05″E
Église Sainte-Croix du Kef	Le Kef	1891	Archeological monument		36°10′46″N 8°42′47″E
Église de Kélibia	Kélibia	1934	Cultural complex		36°50′48.11″N 11°5′28.55″E
Église de Khanguet Gare	Khanguet	1929	Ruins		36°37′23.48″N 10°27′41.67″E
Khlédia church	Khalidia	1939	Cultural complex		36°38′37.9″N 10°11′32.7″E
Église du Kram	Le Kram	1903	Cultural complex		36°50′0″N 10°19′2″E
El Krib church	El Krib				
Église Notre-Dame du Mont-Carmel de Mahdia	Mahdia	1861	Multi-use complex		35°30′17″N 11°4′14″E
Église de La Manouba	La Manouba	1894	Auditorium		36°48′32.41″N 10°5′39.79″E
La Marsa church	La Marsa	1882	Chapel		36°52′32.91″N 10°20′20.96″E
Église Saint-Vincent-de-Paul de Massicault	Borj El Amri	1909	Municipality headquarter		36°42′39.35″N 9°53′1.32″E
Église de Mateur	Mateur	1898	Abandoned		37°2′17″N 9°40′4″E
Maxula Radès church	Radès	1911	Abandoned		36°46′6″N 10°16′32″E
Église Notre-Dame-de-Lourdes de Médenine	Médenine	1918	Destroyed		33°20′59″N 10°28′41″E
Église Saint-Augustin de Medjez el-Bab	Medjez el-Bab	1913	Abandoned		36°39′2″N 9°36′35″E
Église Sainte-Thérèse de l'Enfant-Jésus de Mégrine-Coteaux	Mégrine	1936	Cultural complex		36°46′9″N 10°14′18″E
Église de Mégrine-Lescure	Mégrine	1957	Kindergarten		36°46′6″N 10°13′30″E
Église d'El Mehrine	El Mehrine	1929	Ruins		36°45′45.3″N 9°51′25.18″E
M’ghira church	Fouchana	1897	Abandoned		
Église de Monastir	Monastir	1862	Destroyed		
Mornaguia church	Mornaguia	1922	Political party office		
M’Raïssa church	Soliman	1913	Administration storage		36°45′10″N 10°33′50″E
Moulinville church	Sfax	1923	Destroyed		34°44′53″N 10°45′42″E
Église de Nabeul	Nabeul	1899	Political party office		36°27′23.18″N 10°44′19.82″E
Oued Ellil church	Oued Ellil				
Église d'Oued Zarga	Oued Zarga	1928	Ruins		36°40′36″N 9°24′48″E
Oueslatia church	Oueslatia				
Église Sainte-Anne de la Pêcherie	La Pêcherie	1919	Library		37°15′20.88″N 9°50′28.74″E
Pont-du-Fahs church	El Fahs	1922	destroyed		36°22′27.1″N 9°54′17.8″E
Église Saint-Pierre l’Apôtre de Porto Farina	Ghar El Melh	1860	Tourist visits		37°10′11.2″N 10°11′22.8″E
Saida church	La Manouba	1928	Hopital		
Sbeitla church	Sbeitla	1928	Destroyed		35°13′48.6″N 9°7′35.37″E
Église Saint-Félix de Schuiggui	Chouigui	1898	Abandoned		36°52′47″N 9°48′23″E
Église du Sers	Sers	1953	Youth house		36°4′25.81″N 9°1′14.33″E
Église Saint-Pierre et Saint-Paul de Sfax	Sfax	1953	Library		34°43′55″N 10°45′39″E
Sidi Bouzid church	Sidi Bouzid				
Sidi Saad church	Nasrallah				
Sidi Thabet church	Sidi Thabet	1940	Cultural complex		36°54′31.5″N 10°2′35.1″E
Soliman church	Soliman				
Église Saint-Clément de Souk El Khemis	Bou Salem	1909	Training center		36°36′37.95″N 8°58′7.19″E
Église Sainte-Félicité de Souk El Arba	Jendouba	1891	Party room		36°30′6.78″N 8°46′46.86″E
La Soukra church	La Soukra				
Église Saint-Félix de Sousse	Sousse	1916	Catholic church		35°49′59″N 10°38′5″E
Église Notre-Dame de l'Immaculée Conception de Sousse	Sousse	1867	Destroyed		35°49′40″N 10°38′22″E
Église de Tabarka	Tabarka	1891	Museum		36°57′21″N 8°45′18″E
Église Sainte-Félicité et Sainte-Perpétue de Tebourba	Tebourba	1948	Library		36°49′39″N 9°50′36″E
Église de Téboursouk	Téboursouk	1922	Auditorium		36°27′29.35″N 9°14′42.76″E
Église Sainte-Marie de Tinja	Tinja	1924	Abandoned		37°9′35″N 9°45′30″E
Tozeur church	Tozeur	1931	Post office		33°55′11.1″N 8°8′16.15″E
Cathedral of St. Vincent de Paul	Tunis	1897	Catholic church		36°48′0″N 10°10′44″E
Chapelle Notre-Dame de Tunis	Tunis	1915	Destroyed		36°49′49.82″N 10°9′37.18″E
Chapelle Notre-Dame de l'Espérance de Tunis	Tunis	1926	Cultural complex		36°47′46.95″N 10°10′25.3″E
Église Notre-Dame-du-Rosaire de Tunis	Tunis	1895	Cultural complex		36°47′33″N 10°10′28″E
Chapelle Notre-Dame-de-Sion de Tunis	Tunis	1891	Destroyed		36°47′54.56″N 10°10′47.87″E
Église du Sacré-Cœur de Tunis	Tunis	1899	Police office		36°48′22″N 10°10′28″E
Église Sainte-Croix de Tunis	Tunis	1837	Town house locals		36°47′56″N 10°10′29″E
Église Sainte-Jeanne-d'Arc de Tunis	Tunis	1911	Catholic church		36°49′9″N 10°10′51″E
Église Saint-Joseph de Tunis	Tunis	1941	Cultural complex		36°47′55″N 10°11′4″E
Bab Saadoun church	Tunis				
Église Notre-Dame du Bon-Conseil de Tunis	Tunis				
Église de la Sainte-Famille de Villejacques	Ariana Governorate	1936	Post office		
Église de Zaghouan	Zaghouan	1902	Cultural complex		36°23′57″N 10°8′53″E
Église Notre-Dame de la Garde de Zarzis	Zarzis	1922	Museum		33°30′14″N 11°6′55″E

== Other churches ==
Church	Location	Building date	Nowadays use	Image	Map reference
Église Saint-Eugène d'Armand Colin	El M'nagha	1949	Abandoned		36°33′17.23″N 9°56′37.07″E
Église de Beni M'Tir	Beni M'Tir	1952	Children holiday camp		36°44′19.13″N 8°44′2.1″E
Église de Depienne	Sminja	1923	Destroyed		36°27′26.4″N 10°1′28.5″E
Église de Chemtou	Chemtou	1904	Ruins		36°29′29″N 8°34′34″E
Église de la Cité Mellègue	Nebeur	1951	Closed		36°19′11.68″N 8°42′23.81″E
Église du Mont-Carmel du djebel Trozza	El Alâa	1912	Ruins		35°32′31.01″N 9°34′50.68″E
Église Saint-Augustin d'Enfidaville	Enfidha	1907	Museum		36°8′7″N 10°22′47″E
Église Saint-Joseph de Gafsa	Gafsa	1912	Municipality headquarter		34°23′50.89″N 8°48′16.62″E
Église Sainte-Barbe de Jérissa	Jérissa	1911	Cultural complex		35°50′24″N 8°38′3″E
Église de Khanguet Hadjaj	Grombalia	1899	Home		36°36′28″N 10°25′40.2″E
Église de Moularès	Moularès	1925	Closed		34°29′25.90″N 8°16′20.84″E
Église Saint-Paul de Redeyef	Redeyef	1912	Closed		34°22′57.96″N 8°9′0″E
Église de Sainte Marie du Zit	Oued-ez-Zit	1895	Abandoned		36°24′57.1″N 10°18′20.48″E
Église Notre-Dame-des-Victoires de Tataouine	Tataouine	1918	Abandoned		32°55′35″N 10°26′39″E
Église de la Sainte-Famille de Thibar	Thibar	1902	High school		36°31′32.9″N 9°5′52.2″E
