= Compagnie des chemins de fer Bône-Guelma =

French railway company (1875–1923)

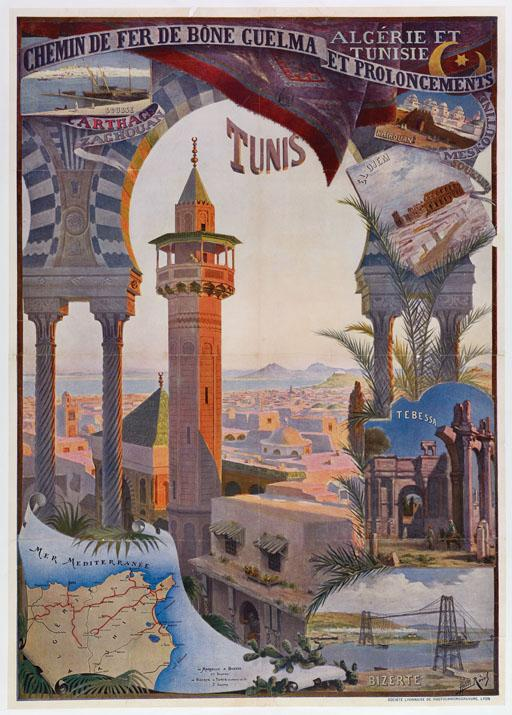
- Type: Company
- Industry: Railway
- Founded: 1875
- Founder: Ernest Goüin
- Defunct: 1923
- Headquarters: Algeria, Tunisia
- Parent: Société de Construction des Batignolles

The Compagnie des chemins de fer Bône-Guelma (Bône-Guelma Railway Company) built and operated railway lines in Algeria and Tunisia between 1875 and 1923 during the French colonial period. In 1923 it became the Compagnie fermière des chemins de fer tunisiens.

== History ==
Evolution of the Tunisian railway network between 1880 and 1941

The Bone-Guelma Railway Company was founded in 1875. The concession for construction of the line from Bone to Guelma, between the French government and the Société de Construction des Batignolles, was ceded by the latter in 1876 to the Bône-Guelma Railway Company, which had been founded by Ernest Goüin, with the assistance of the Banque de Paris et des Pays-Bas, of which Goüin was a director. The Bone-Guelma company contracted with Batignolles to build the line. It developed its network in Algeria and Tunisia with respectively 449 kilometres (279 mi) and 1,205 kilometres (749 mi) in each of the two countries. The line had a station at Taya, eight kilometers by mule track from the Djebel Taya antimony mine .

The Algerian network was purchased by the State on 6 June 1914 and operated from 1 April 1915 by Algerian State Railways.

In 1922, the Tunisian government bought the Tunisian part of the network and entrusted operations to the Compagnie fermière des chemins de fer tunisiens by an agreement of 22 June 1922.

On June 8, 1923, a general meeting of shareholders took note of the change in the company's activities by changing its name to the Compagnie fermière des chemins de fer tunisiens.

== Lines ==
=== Algeria ===
The total length of the network in Algeria was 449 kilometres (279 mi) in 1913.

- Bône – Duvivier 55 kilometres (34 mi) opened in 1876
- Duvivier – Guelma – Kroubs 168 kilometres (104 mi) opened from 1877 to 1879
- Duvivier – Souk Ahras – Ghardimaou 105 kilometres (65 mi) opened from 1881 to 1884
- Souk Ahras – Tébessa 130 kilometres (81 mi) opened in 1888 (metre gauge)

The company also operated the 11.4 kilometres (7.1 mi) tramway from Saint-Paul to Randon.

=== Tunisia ===
In Tunisia the company operated two networks. The northern network was built at the normal gauge and the southern network used the metre-gauge. The networks included the following lines:

==== Normal track (Northern network) ====
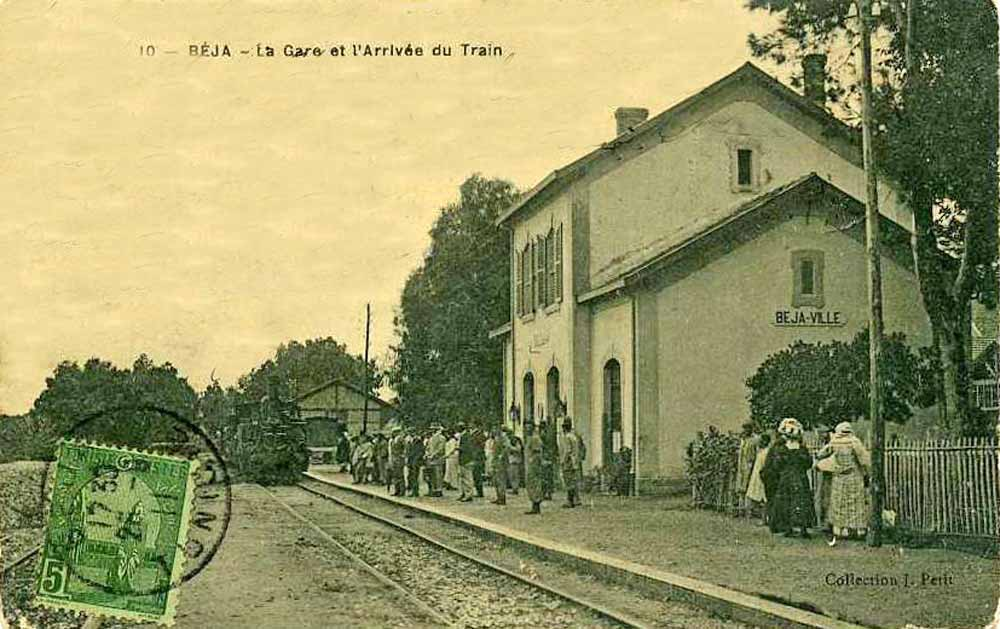
Béja Station

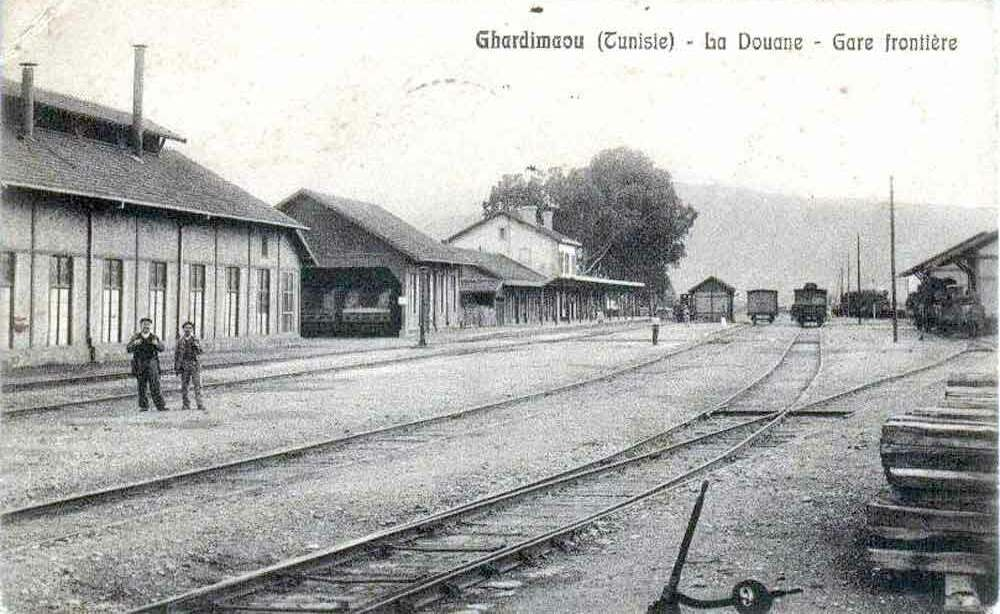
Ghardimaou Station

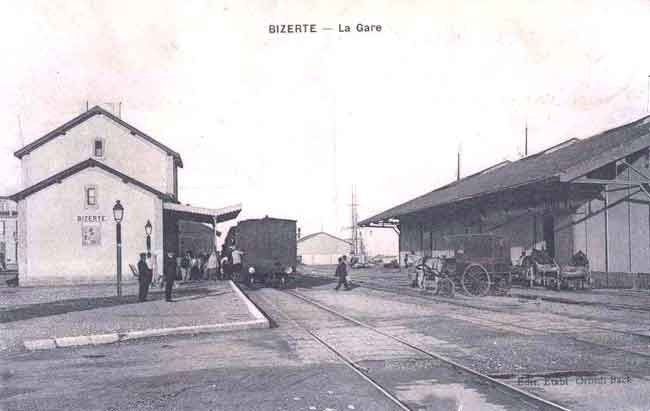
Bizerte Station

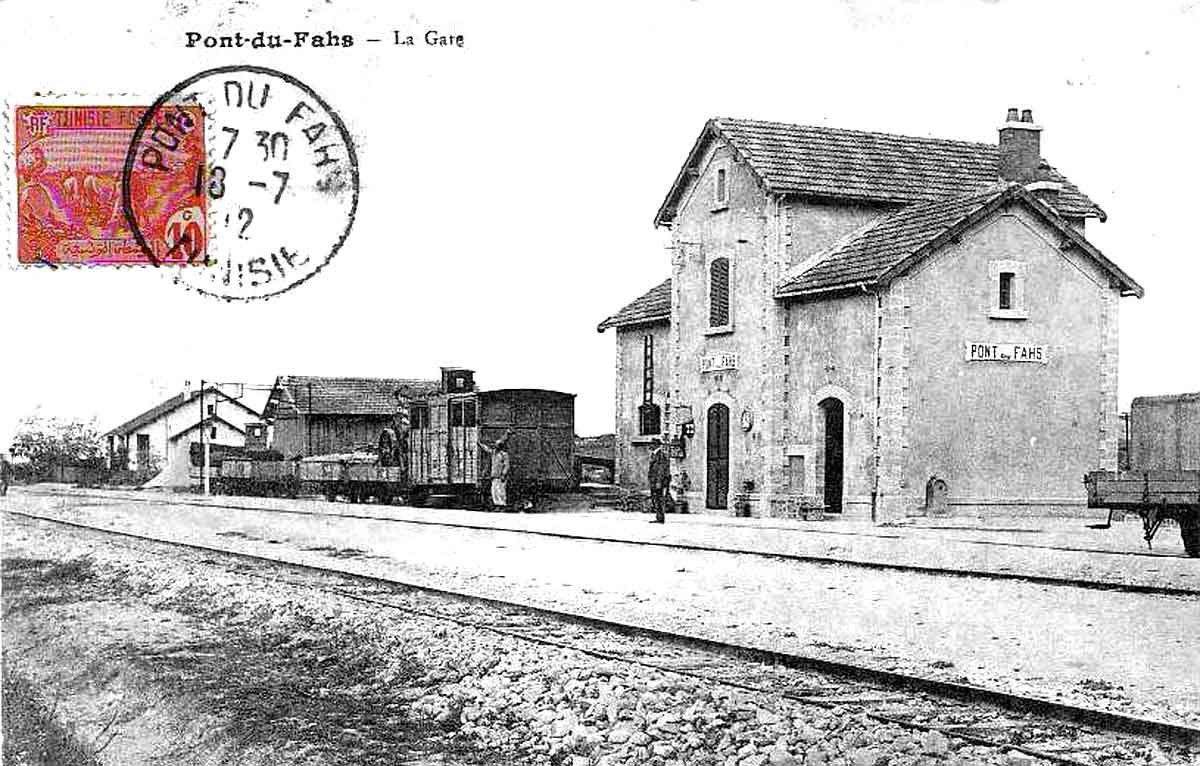
Pont-du-Fahs Station

- Tunis – Djedeida – Tebourba 27.9 kilometres (17.3 mi), opened in 1878
- Tebourba – Majaz al Bab 31.9 kilometres (19.8 mi), opened in 1878
- Majaz al Bab – Oued Zarga 18.4 kilometres (11.4 mi), opened in 1878
- Oued Zarga – Béja – Pont-de-Trajan 34 kilometres (21 mi), opened in 1879
- Pont-de-Trajan – Sidi-Ali-Jébini 20.7 kilometres (12.9 mi), opened in 1879
- Sidi-Ali-Jébini – Jendouba 28 kilometres (17 mi), opened in 1879
- Tunis-Nord – Le Bardo 9 kilometres (5.6 mi), opened in 1873 and surrendered in 1879 by the Tunisian Railway Company
- Jendouba – Ghardimaou 33.8 kilometres (21.0 mi), opened in 1880
- Tunis-Marine – Hammam-Lif 16.9 kilometres (10.5 mi), opened in 1882 (converted to metre gauge in 1897)
- Mastouta – Béja 12.7 kilometres (7.9 mi), opened in 1885
- Djedeida – Mateur – Tinja – Bizerte 72.9 kilometres (45.3 mi), branch in 1894
- Tinja – Ferryville 3.8 kilometres (2.4 mi), branch opened in 1894
- Tunis-Jonction (Bab Alioua) – La Goulette-Port 13.9 kilometres (8.6 mi), opened in 1909 (Three lines of rails 1000/1435 mm)
- Mateur – Tamera
  - Mateur – Jefna 26.9 kilometres (16.7 mi), opened in 1909
  - Jefna – Tamera 36.2 kilometres (22.5 mi), opened on 1 September 1912
- Mateur-Sud – Sidi M'himech – Béja 67.6 kilometres (42.0 mi), opened on 1 September 1912
- Sidi Smaïl – La Merja – Khereddine 14.1 kilometres (8.8 mi), opened on 1 June 1914
- Khereddine – Nebeur 29.2 kilometres (18.1 mi), opened in 1915
- Tamera – Nefza 9.4 kilometres (5.8 mi), opened on 1 January 1917

==== Metre gauge (South) ====
- Tunis-Marine – Hammam-Lif 16.9 kilometres (10.5 mi), opened in 1882 (converted to metre gauge in 1897)
- Hammam-Lif – Fondouk Jedid – Grombalia 21.9 kilometres (13.6 mi), opened in 1895
- Grombalia – Bir Bouregba – Nabeul-Voyageurs 376 kilometres (234 mi), opened in 1895
- Fondouk Jedid – Menzel Bouzelfa 13.6 kilometres (8.5 mi), branch opened in 1895
- Bir Bouregba – Enfidha 39.9 kilometres (24.8 mi), opened in 1896
- Enfidha – Kalâa Seghira 42.8 kilometres (26.6 mi), opened in 1896
- Kalâa Seghira – Sousse 6.8 kilometres (4.2 mi), opened in 1896
- Tunis-Ville – Sminja – Zaghouan 61.3 kilometres (38.1 mi), opened in 1897
- Sminja – Pont-du-Fahs 146 kilometres (91 mi), opened in 1897
- Djebel Jelloud – Hammam-Lif 13.3 kilometres (8.3 mi), opened in 1897 (converted to metre gauge)
- Sousse – Sousse-Port 1.6 kilometres (0.99 mi), opened in 1897
- Bir El Kassaâ – Radès (south port of La Goulette) 9.4 kilometres (5.8 mi), opened in 1897
- Bir El Kassaâ – La Laverie 20 kilometres (12 mi), opened in 1899
- Sousse – Ouerdanin – Moknine 40 kilometres (25 mi), opened in 1899
- Pont-du-Fahs – Bou Arada 25.4 kilometres (15.8 mi), opened in 1902
- Bou Arada – Gaâfour 316 kilometres (196 mi), opened in 1904
- Gaâfour – Les Salines 50.3 kilometres (31.3 mi), opened in 1904
- Les Salines – Le Kef 30.9 kilometres (19.2 mi), embranchement opened in 1904
- Les Salines – Fej Tameur – Kalaat es Senam 81.9 kilometres (50.9 mi), opened in 1905
- Fej Tameur – Slata 29.1 kilometres (18.1 mi), branch opened in 1908
- Aïn Ghrasésia – Jilma 93.6 kilometres (58.2 mi), opened in 1908
- Jilma – Sbeitla 286 kilometres (178 mi), opened on 15 June 1908
- Sbeitla – Kasserine – Henchir Souatir 124 kilometres (77 mi), opened on 1 December 1909
- Ouerdanin – Sfax 116 kilometres (72 mi), opened in 1911
- Menzel Bouzelfa – Henchir Lebna 35.3 kilometres (21.9 mi), opened in 1918
- Henchir Lebna – Oum Douil 8.6 kilometres (5.3 mi), opened in 1925
- Henchir Lebna – Menzel Temime 11 kilometres (6.8 mi), opened in 1927
- Rhilane Station (Algeria) – Aïn Kerma (Tunisia) 11 kilometres (6.8 mi), opened on 1 May 1931

==== Junction stations ====
- Sfax Station with the network of the Compagnie des phosphates et des chemins de fer de Gafsa
- Henchir Souatir Station with the network of the Compagnie des phosphates et des chemins de fer de Gafsa

== Rolling stock ==
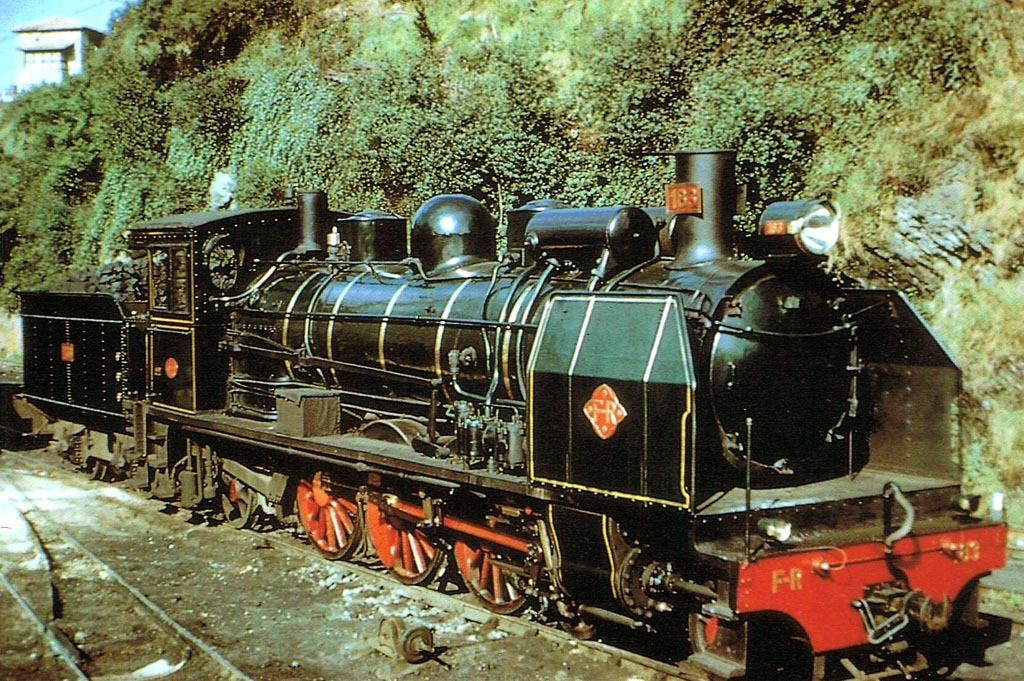
Locomotive No.183, sold to the La Robla railway in Spain

- Normal track
  - No.1 to 39, type 030t, delivered between 1876 and 1882 by the Société de construction des Batignolles
  - No.81 to 86, type 130t, delivered in 1899 by Baldwin Locomotive Works
  - No.136 to 155, type 030t, delivered between 1880 and 1883 by the Société de construction des Batignolles
  - No.181 to 185, type 231, delivered in 1914 by the Société Alsacienne de Constructions Mécaniques (SACM)
  - No.186 to 188, type 231, delivered in 1924 by the SACM
  - No.189 to 192, type 231, delivered in 1930 by the SACM
  - No.221 to 235, type 150, delivered in 1910 by the SACM
  - No.501 to 505, type 230, delivered in 1904 by the Société de construction des Batignolles
  - No.11 and 12, type 130t, delivered in 1904 by the Société de construction des Batignolles
- metre track
  - No.1 to 2, type 030t, delivered in 1888 by the Société de construction des Batignolles
  - No.3 to 9, type 030t, delivered in 1894 by the Société de construction des Batignolles
  - No.201 to 204, type 030t, delivered in 1886 by the Société de construction des Batignolles
  - No.211 and 212, type 030t, delivered in 1886 by the Société de construction des Batignolles
  - No.281 to 284, type 130t, delivered in 1899 by Baldwin Locomotive Works
  - No.401 to 415, type 130t, delivered between 1897 and 1907 by the Société de construction des Batignolles
  - No.681 to 690, type Mallet 030-030t, Baldwin Locomotive Works, delivered in 1920 (Note: Baldwin Locomotives Works and the American Locomotive Company built about 150 Mallet-type articulated locomotives for export, including the Bône-Guelma railway locomotives nos. 681 to 690, built by Baldwin.)
  - No.701 to 712, type 230, delivered between 1905 and 1907 by the Société de construction des Batignolles
  - No.801 to 805, type 231, delivered in 1913 by the SACM

== Sources ==
- Burnel, Anne (1995), La Société de construction des Batignolles de 1914-1939: histoire d'un déclin, Librairie Droz, ISBN 978-2-600-00094-9
- Jon Davis, Mallets built for export by North American locomotive builders
- Meynier, Gilbert (1981), L'Algérie révélée: la guerre de 1914-1918 et le premier quart du XXe siècle, Librairie Droz, ISBN 978-2-600-04098-3
