= Douar Hicher =

Coordinates: 36°49′45″N 10°05′22″E

- Commune and town
- Interactive map of Douar Hicher
- Country: Tunisia
- Governorate: Manouba Governorate

Population (2022)
  - Total: 93,254
- Time zone: UTC+1 (CET)

Douar Hicher is a town and commune in the Manouba Governorate, Tunisia. It is known for the important political role that its inhabitants, especially the youth, played in the manifestations during the Tunisian revolution between December 2010 and February 2011.

== Geography ==
It is located a few kilometers from Tunis downtown, on the road to Oued Ellil. It is limited by Hay Ettadhamen to the east, La Manouba to the west, Den Den to the south and Oued Ellil to the north. Its territory covers 1,125 hectares.

=== Evolution ===
The city was part of Ariana governorate until 2001, date of the creation of the Manouba governorate, to which it got attached as one of its eight municipalities.

=== Administrative geography ===
Administratively attached to the governorate of Manouba, it has a delegation and a municipality with a population of 82,532 inhabitants in 2014, which makes it one of the most important towns in the suburbs of Tunis. Besides Douar Hicher, the municipality has other agglomerated cities such as Ennassim, Erriadh, Echabeb and Khaled Ibn El Oualid.

== History ==
The inhabitants of Douar Hicher, especially the young among them, played a very important role in the popular demonstrations against the dictatorship of Zine el-Abidine Ben Ali which led to the 2011 revolution.

The district, with that of Ettadhamen, represents an almost obligatory stop in electoral campaigns, both presidential and legislative.

== Economy ==
Much of the town's population works in the local factories which have made Douar Hicher a local industrial center. Among the most widespread activities, we can mention:

- Textile industry
- Wood and furniture industry;
- Leather industry
- Glaze industry
- Marble industry;
- Metal door industry;
- Iron machinery industry;
- Plastic industry

But even with this diversity, the socio-economic level of Douar Hicher remains one of the poorest in Tunisia. Before independence, the local population depended a lot on solidarity funds 26-26 promoted by ex-president Zine El Abidine Ben Ali. During the latter era and until now, the youth of Douar Hicher, like many other neighborhoods in greater Tunis, suffer from one of the highest unemployment rates in the whole country due to the marginalization that Ben Ali's system created and those who followed maintained. According to official figures, this rate is two to three times higher than the 15.5% recorded nationally, especially among young people with university degrees

== Douar hicher and Politics ==
=== Before the revolution ===
Before the revolution, the Tunisian people lived under a dictatorial regime that practiced repression and marginalization in the country. Before the revolution, the youths of Douar Hescher suffered from marginalization in the political, social and economic spheres. Indeed, the youths of Heather Hecher were absent and away from participation in the political life that was lacking in the country before the revolution, in addition to the fragile economic conditions of young people who suffer from unemployment, absenteeism and exclusion, and it means a lot of discrimination. All of these factors led to a situation worsening and caused a lot of youth to become very angry, which led to the outbreak of protests, demanding a change of situation and demanding a revolution.

=== After the Revolution ===
Following the outbreak of the revolution and the escape of former President Zine El Abidine Ben Ali, the political situation in the Hescher roundabout changed, and freedoms of freedom of expression, opinion and participation in political life became possible. The youth became practicing their freedoms in all fields (religion, politics, art, freedom of expression, etc.). A glimmer of hope has emerged to change the situation and improve the situation of young people in the Hescher roundabout. However, the hoped-for change did not happen, it is true that all freedoms are available to young people, but in the economic sphere the situation did not change, but rather increased in worsening. And the economic situation of young people is misleading. The benefits of the revolution and the youth have not been achieved.

== Douar Hicher and Culture ==
=== Cultural infrastructure ===
The cultural infrastructure of the city of Douar Hescher is very limited. It has only one cultural center and two public libraries. In spite of these few resources, the local civil society is active, by organizing activities for the youth and engaging them in debates in the cultural center in Douar Hescher and even outside. For many young people, especially girls, these activities are the only way to entertain. The culture center also regularly presents films for children, followed by meetings or workshops led by professionals depending on the topic of the month.

The city also has three training centers for people interested in crafts. These centers also provide craftsmen with spaces to display and sell their products. Its total capacity spans over 6000m 22.

According to a study conducted by a group of sociologists on youth from the Hescher and Solidarity Circle, 55% of active associations are athletic, 18.5% non-profit, 10.3% cultural, and 10.5% religious. This study shows that only one out of every four young adults knows at least one active connection in their neighborhood.

=== Media ===
The city has a radio and a local radio station who is presenting cultural, sports and local news.

== Douar Hescher and Sport ==
Sports are the most popular entertainment activity in Douar Hicher. More than half of the local associations are sporting, something which has pushed the government to invest in the infrastructure of these activities by developing a multidisciplinary sports center inaugurated in 2018 by the former Prime Minister Youssef Chahed.

== Douar Hescher and Education ==
According to the official website of the town, it includes 18 schools, 5 primary schools and 3 high schools. That said, according to a study carried out on a representative sample of Douar Hicher's youth in 2018, 51.7% of young people stopped their studies in high school, and only 27.9% went to higher education7. The researchers find that violence within these establishments, something which was confirmed by 20% of the young people questioned, is one of the main causes for dropping out of school. It is also estimated that the average absenteeism rate in the schools of Douar Hicher and Ettadhamen combined is 60%.

== See also ==
- List of cities in Tunisia
