= Achref Aouadi =

Tunisian civil society activist (born 1986)

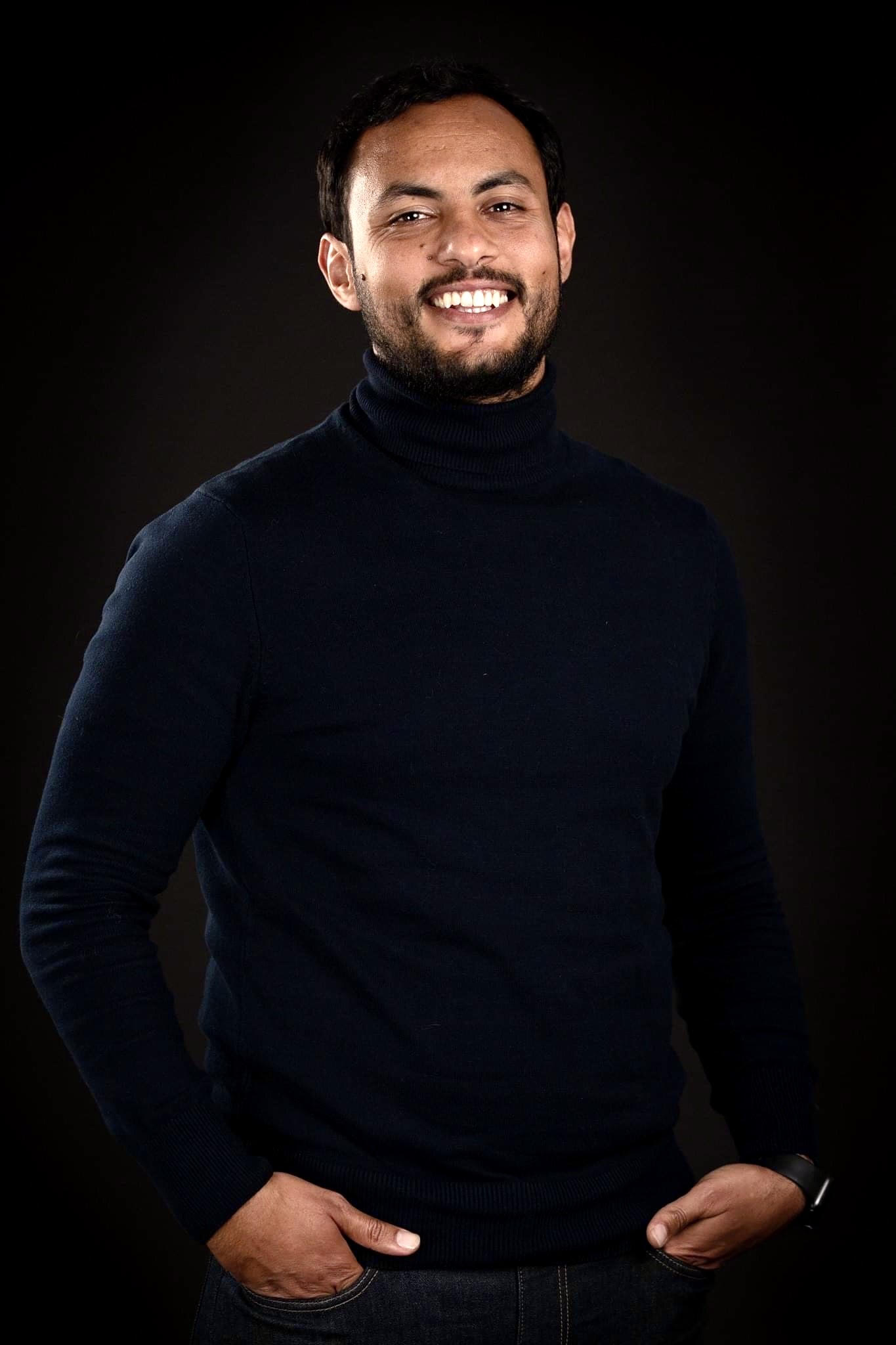

President of I Watch Organization

Personal details
- Born: 27 May 1986 (age 40) Sers, Tunisia
- Education: University of Tunis, Birmingham University, Harvard University

Achref Aouadi (Arabic: أشرف العوادي) is a Tunisian civil society activist and founder and former president of the Tunisian watchdog organisation I-Watch working on transparency and anti-corruption. He was born on May 27, 1986, in Sers in El Kef. Aouadi belongs to a family of militants and members of the opposition to the Bourguiba and Ben Ali regimes; his father and uncle were sentenced by the State Security Court in 1975 along with Hamma Hammami, Sedek Mhenni, Mohamed Kilani, Nejib Chebbi, and other militants.

== Education ==
Aouadi has a research master's degree in English Literature - Cross-Cultural Studies from the Tunisian Higher Institute of Languages, University of Tunis, Tunisia and another master's degree in International Political Economy from Birmingham University, the United Kingdom. He taught International Political Economy at Ibn Charaf Institute in Tunis.

He enrolled in the International Anti-Corruption Academy in 2011, before engaging in fighting corruption.

== Career and achievements ==
As a student, in 2009, Aouadi founded the “Student-To-Student university club”

In 2011, Achref started a voting campaign called Go Vote then came the idea of I-Watch, which later became an established yet young non-governmental organisation. He also observed the 2011 elections.

Aouadi represents the Tunisian Civil Society in the United Nations Convention Anti-Corruption yearly. He was chosen by the United Nations in 2011.

Achref Aouadi, on behalf of the I-Watch organisation, won the TI Amalia Award in September 2017. He was nominated as well for the Buffett Award for Emerging Global Leaders.

Aouadi was appointed as an Ashoka fellow in 2019.

== Nessma affair ==
In July 2016, the I-Watch organisation published an investigative report that showed the taxes invasion of the company Karoui & Karoui owned by Nabil Karoui and his brother. After his withdrawal from I-Watch, Aouadi came back into presidency to assume his responsibilities in the Nessma Investigation.

After the audio leak of Nabil Karoui, owner of Nessma TV in April 2017, that included defamation and threats, Aouadi declared that Karoui had put a car in front of their headquarters in Tunis to observe them.

Different organisations released statements in support of Achref Aouadi and the I-Watch Organisation and its members. The Financial Judicial Center convened an invitation to hear what Aouadi had in the presented case of tax evasion of Nessma. The Minister of Civil Society and Human Rights Mehdi Ben Gharbia reacted to the issue and met with Aouadi to discuss it.
