= El Aroussa Church =

Former church in El Aroussa, Tunisia

- Église d'El Aroussa
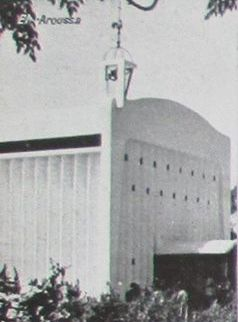

Religion
- Affiliation: Catholicism
- Status: abandoned

Location
- Location: El Aroussa, Siliana Governorate, Tunisia
- Interactive map of El Aroussa Church
- Coordinates: 36.380475°N 9.453547°E

The El Aroussa Church (French: L'église d'El Aroussa), located in El Aroussa in Tunisia, is a Catholic church constructed in 1953 during the French protectorate. It is currently abandoned.

== History of the church ==
The third subscription was successful. Land was purchased and, thanks to financial assistance from the archbishopric, the church was completed in 1953.
