= Maxula Radès church =

- Église de Maxula-Radès
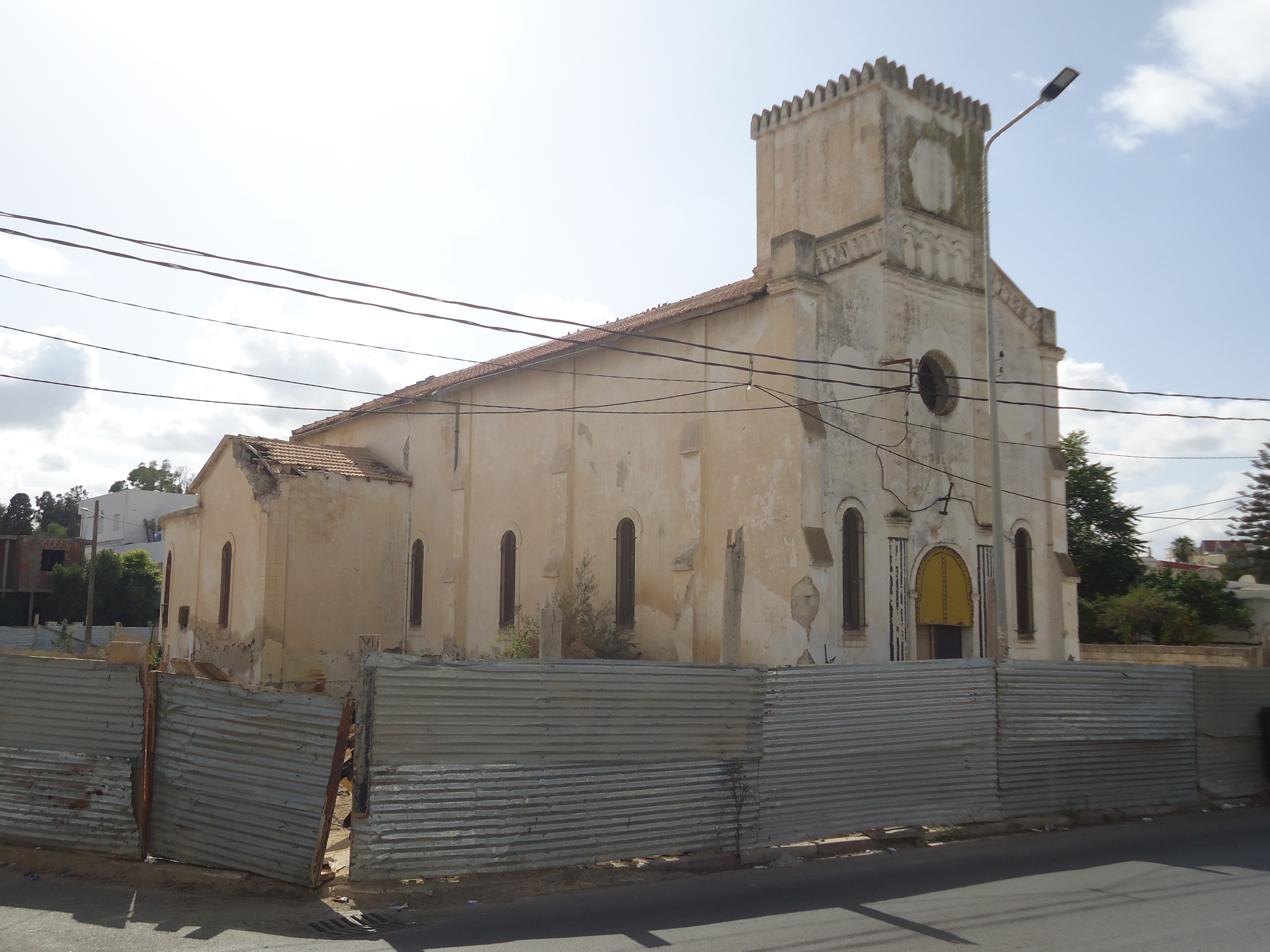
- Maxula Radès church on 25 October 2023.
- Maxula Radès church
- 36°46′6″N 10°16′32″E
- Address: Radès, Ben Arous Governorate, Tunisia
- Country: Tunisia
- Denomination: Catholic

History
- Status: Abandoned
- Founded: 1911

Architecture
- Architect: Abbé Martin
- Architectural type: Parish church
- Closed: 1964

The Maxula Radès church is an abandoned Catholic church in the city of Radès, Tunisia. It was built in 1911 during the French protectorate of Tunisia. The church was ceded to the Tunisian government in 1964 and has been abandoned ever since.

== History ==
=== First buildings ===
At the end of the 19th century, an orphanage run by Franciscan sisters of Italian nationality from Egypt allowed Christians to gather and pray. However, when the nuns transferred to Tunis, there was a need for a permanent place of worship in Radès, which was experiencing significant population growth. The construction of new villas drove this growth, which was occupied during the summer, and the influx of new inhabitants was encouraged by the establishment of two boarding schools in the city. The parish of Radès was thus created in 1900.

Initially, a temporary chapel made entirely of metal was built. The construction material explains that “in winter, it freezes there and in summer, it is a furnace.”

=== During the French protectorate ===
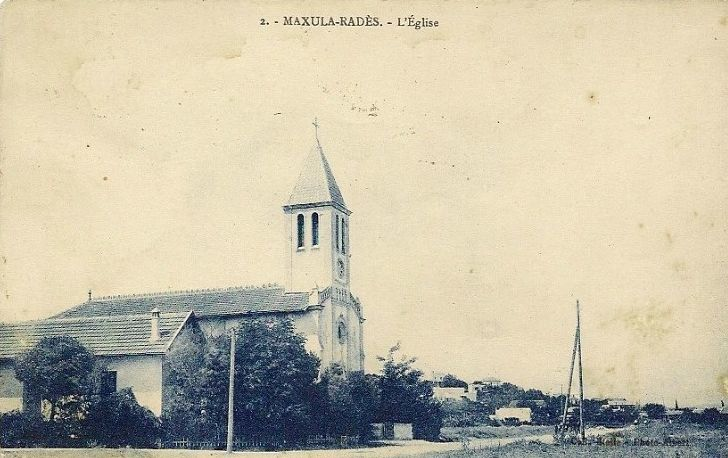
Maxula Radès church in January 1920.

Efforts to construct a permanent church began in 1900 when the municipal council of Maxula Radès requested a subsidy from the protectorate government for purchasing land and building the church. However, the government, citing the separation of Church and State, declined to subsidize the construction. Additionally, when consulted about transferring a plot of land, the Department of Agriculture responded that "the State domain does not have any land in Radès that could be used for the construction of a church and a presbytery.” Consequently, the Roman Catholic Archdiocese of Tunis, under Monseigneur Clément Combes, purchased a 1,010 m² plot of land for 1,515 francs from two individuals, Mrs Foin and Miraude.

Father Martin, parish priest of Hammam-Lif, was responsible for drawing the plans for the building, with help from a contractor, Mr. Nicolas. The budget for the project amounts to 19,460 francs, financed for 13,500 francs by the archbishopric of Carthage, the balance coming from donations from the faithful. The church was inaugurated in 1911 and celebrated in the diocesan newspaper:

The church is equidistant from the hill where so many graceful chalets stand and from the plain where the schools and French villas are hidden in the middle of the eternally flowering gardens. The bell tower will dominate the green countryside where the Bône-Guelma railway company winds through the vineyards and the pretty beach where bathers come to seek freshness and health.

=== After independence ===
The independence of Tunisia in 1956 caused most Europeans to leave. The church was finally closed on the occasion of the modus vivendi signed between the Tunisian government and the Vatican City on 10 July 1964. The building was transferred free of charge with the assurance that it would only be used for purposes of public interest. It was then left abandoned.

As part of a project to transform it into a cultural center, work began in September 2022 before being interrupted in December due to the discovery of Punic cisterns, which are the subject of excavations by the National Heritage Institute (INP). On 5 June 2023, a cooperation agreement was signed between the INP and the Chinese National Archaeological Research Center to study the archaeological finds, publish the research results and maintain, develop and preserve the site.

== Gallery ==
Photos of the church on 25 October 2023.

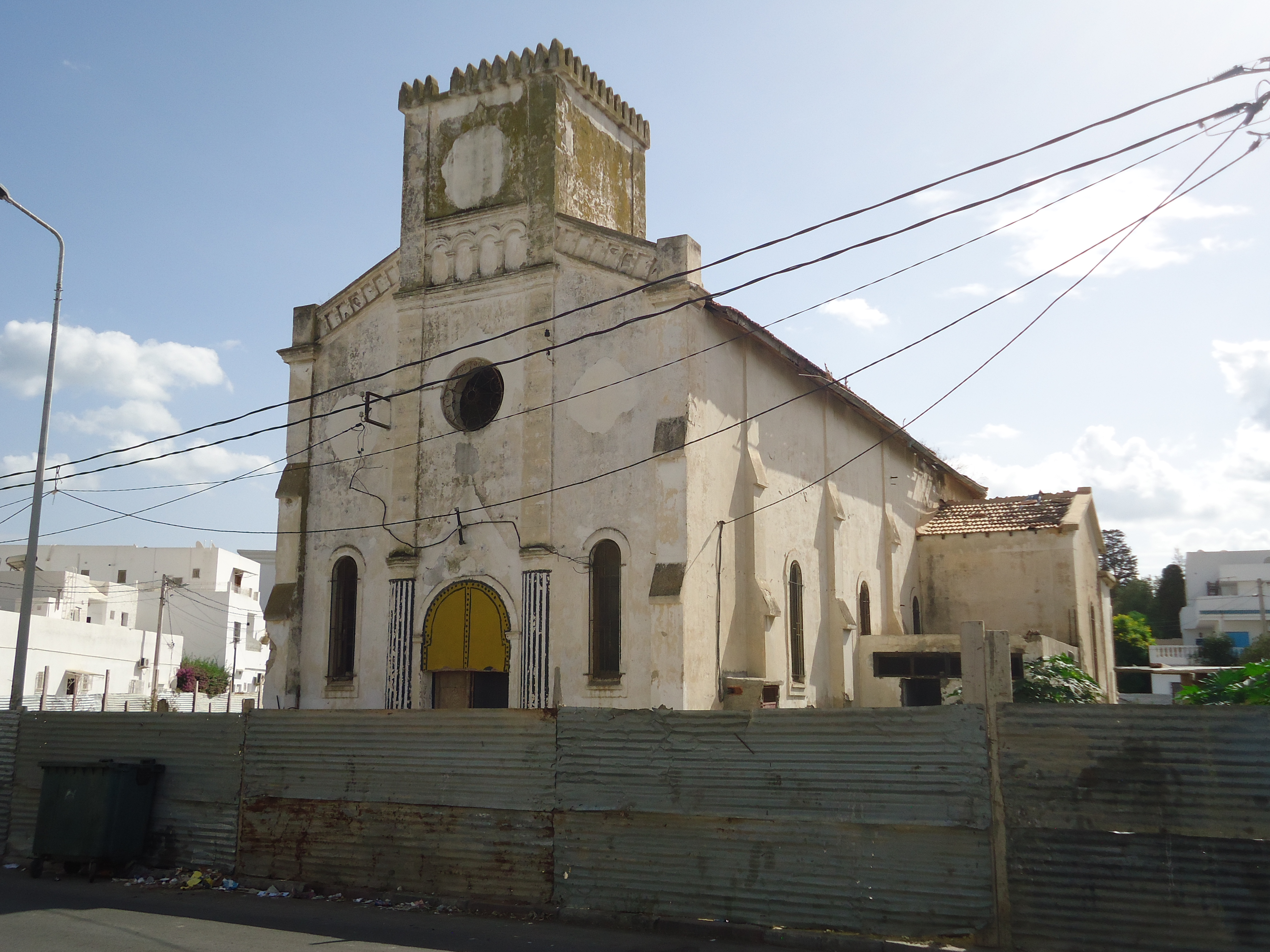
Main entrance.

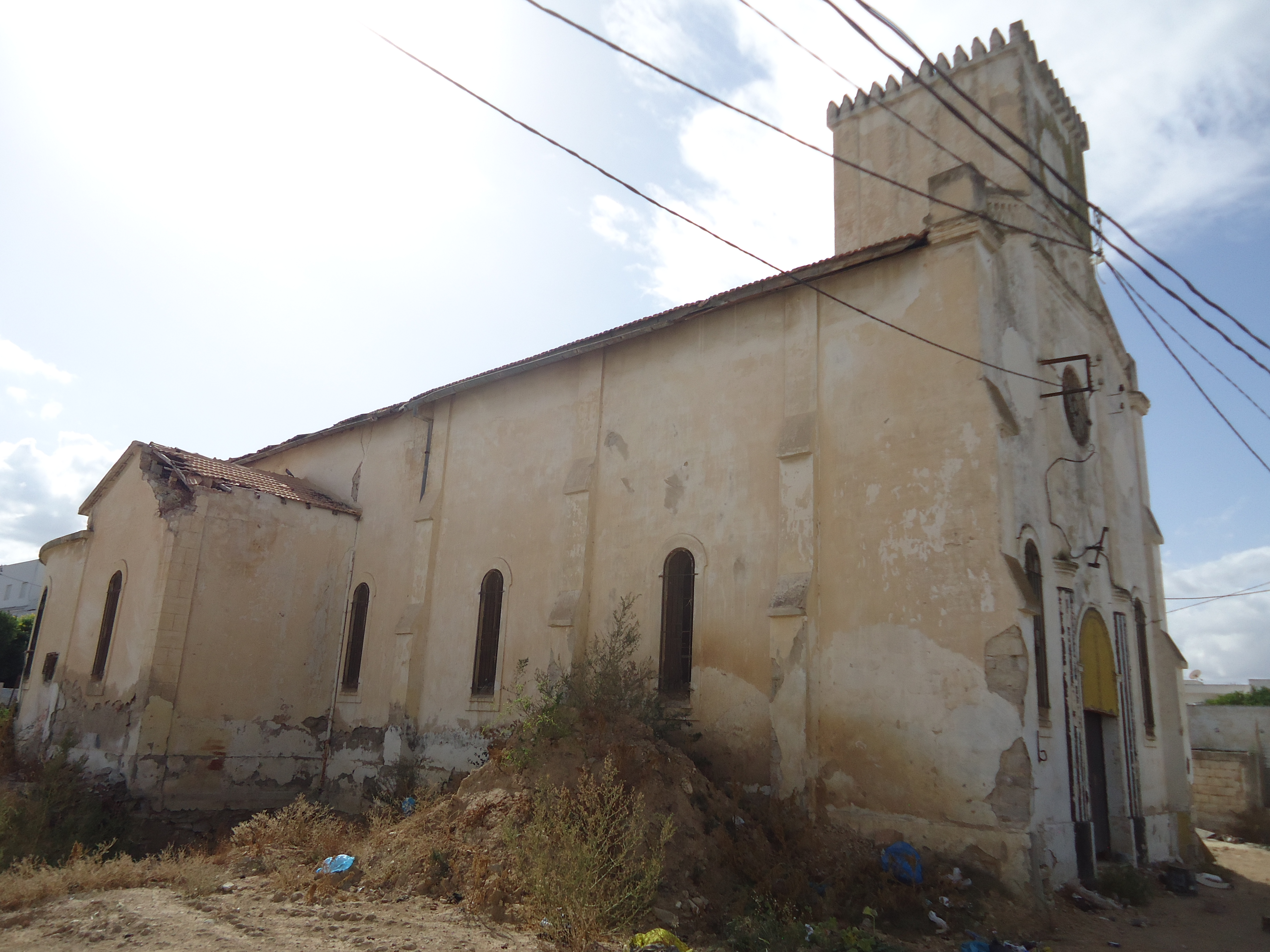
East side.

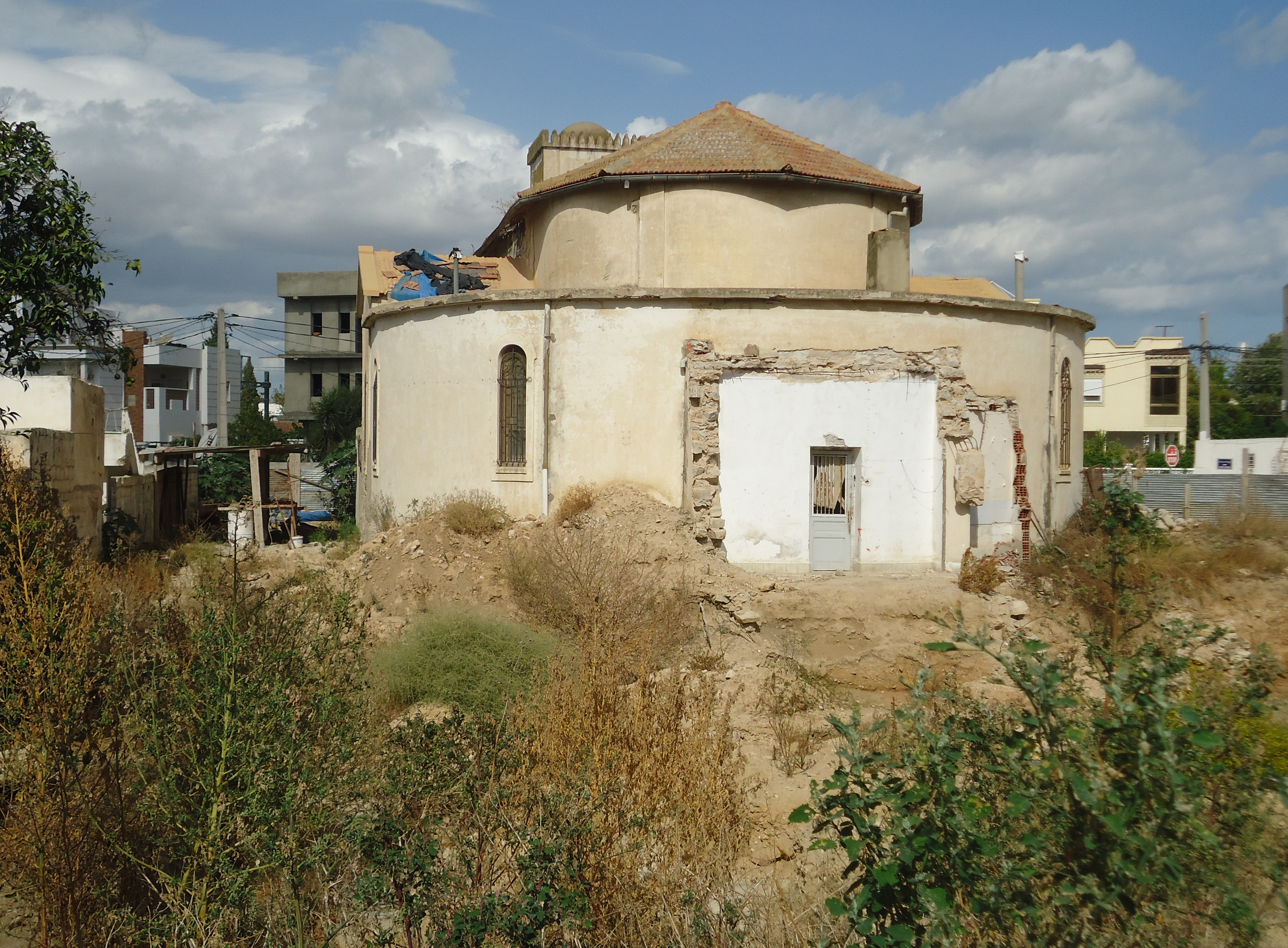
South side.

== See also ==
- Catholic Church in Tunisia
- List of Catholic churches in Tunisia
