= Chusira =

Africa Proconsularis (125 AD)

The Diocese of Cusira is a home suppressed and titular see of the Roman Catholic Church.

Cusira was a civitas of the Roman province of Byzacena, and is identifiable with Kessera (Kesra) in the Siliana Governorate modern Tunisia. Cusira was on the Limes Tripolitanus, at 9.36482N 35.81447E, flourished from 330 BC to about 640 AD, was a city of refuge during nomad invasions from the south, and was the seat of an ancient episcopal see. At this venue, according to some authors including Mesnage and Ferron, could be attributed to the bishop Felix Custrensis, who was among the Catholic bishops summoned to Carthage in 484 by the Vandal king Huneric.

Today Cusira survives as titular bishopric and the current bishop is Łukasz Mirosław Buzun, of Kalisz.
