= Sidi Bou Rouis =

Coordinates: 36°10′N 9°07′E

- Commune and town
- Interactive map of Sidi Bou Rouis
- Country: Tunisia
- Governorate: Siliana Governorate

Government
  - Mayor: Samir Ferchichi (Popular Front)

Population (2014)
  - Total: 3,265
- Time zone: UTC+1 (CET)

Sidi Bou Rouis is a town and commune in the Siliana Governorate, Tunisia.

== See also ==
- List of cities in Tunisia
