= Bargou =

Bargou برقو الرُّبَّع
- Commune and town
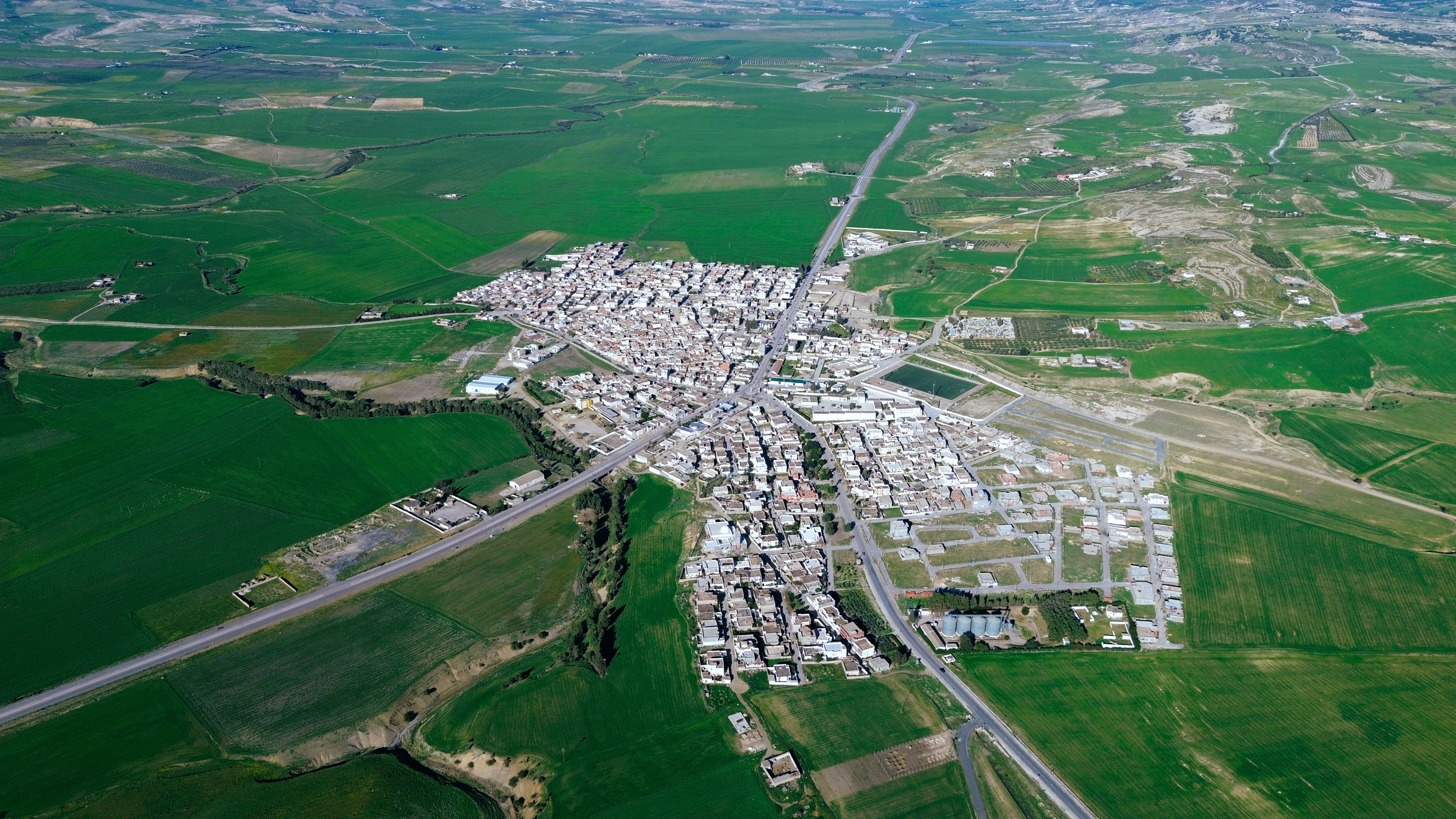
- A photo of Bargou taken by a drone.
- Interactive map of Bargou
- Coordinates: 36.09°N 9.57°E
- Country: Tunisia
- Governorate: Siliana Governorate

Government
  - Mayor: Hatem Mansi

Population (2024)
  - Total: 11,505
- Time zone: UTC+1 (CET)
- Postal code: 6170
- Area code: 78
- Website: commune-bargou.gov.tn.

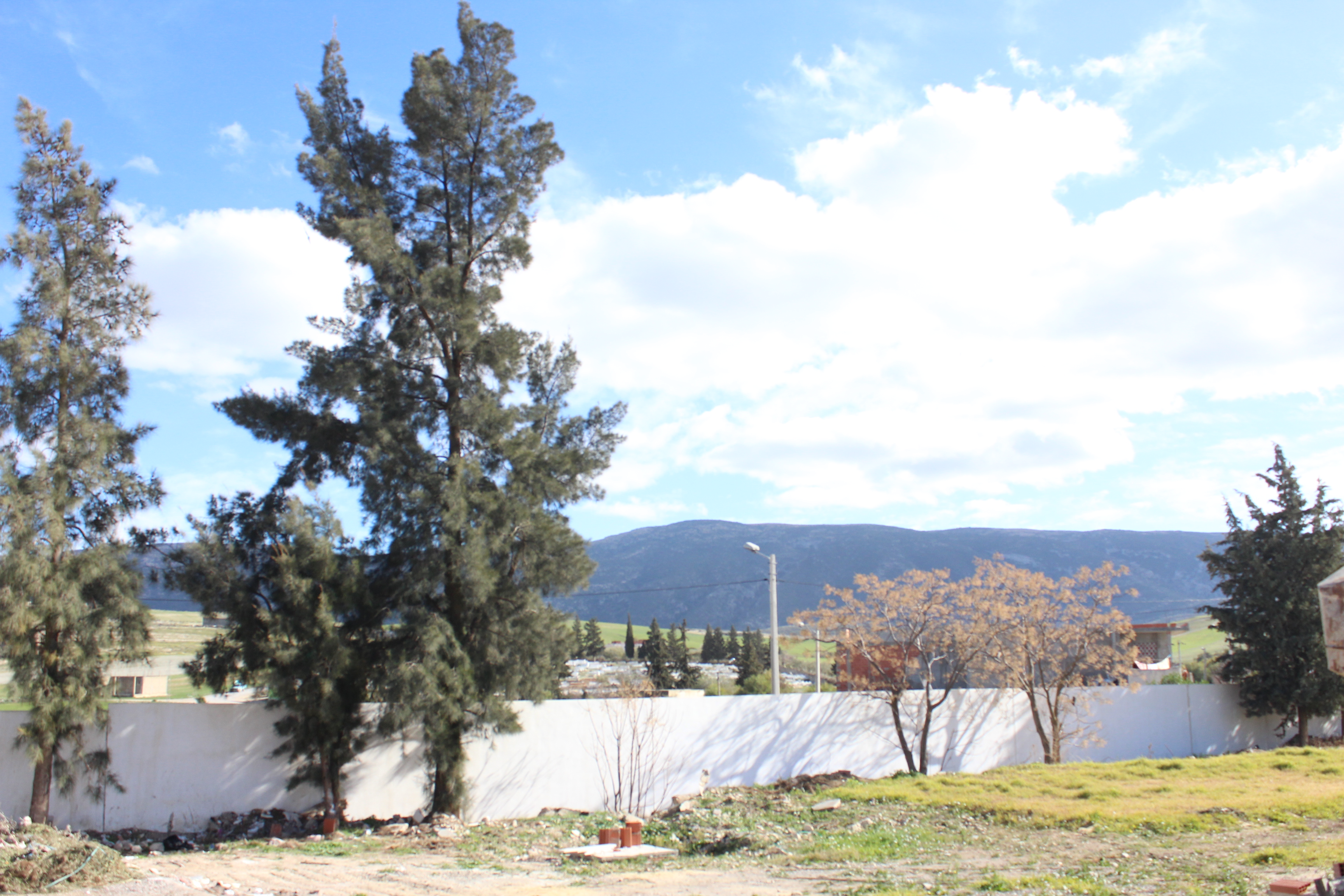
A photo from Bargou.

Bargou is a town and commune in the Siliana Governorate, Tunisia. As of 2024 it had a population of 11,505.

== Population ==
2014 Census (Municipal)
| Homes | Families | Males | Females | Total |
|---|---|---|---|---|
| 1458 | 1296 | 2347 | 2569 | 4916 |

== History ==
Bargou and its surrounding region played a role in Tunisia’s struggle for independence. On 13 November 2014, local and national authorities commemorated the 60th anniversary of the Battle of Bargou, a confrontation that took place during the final years of French colonial rule and is remembered locally as part of the resistance movement leading to Tunisian independence.

The town lies on the northern slopes of Jebel Bargou, a mountain in the Tunisian Dorsal range rising to over 1,200 metres above sea level. The mountain has historically influenced settlement and agricultural patterns in the region and remains a defining geographic feature of the area.

== See also ==
- List of cities in Tunisia
