= Kesra =

Coordinates: 35°49′N 9°22′E

Kesra (كسرى) Kessera
- Commune and town
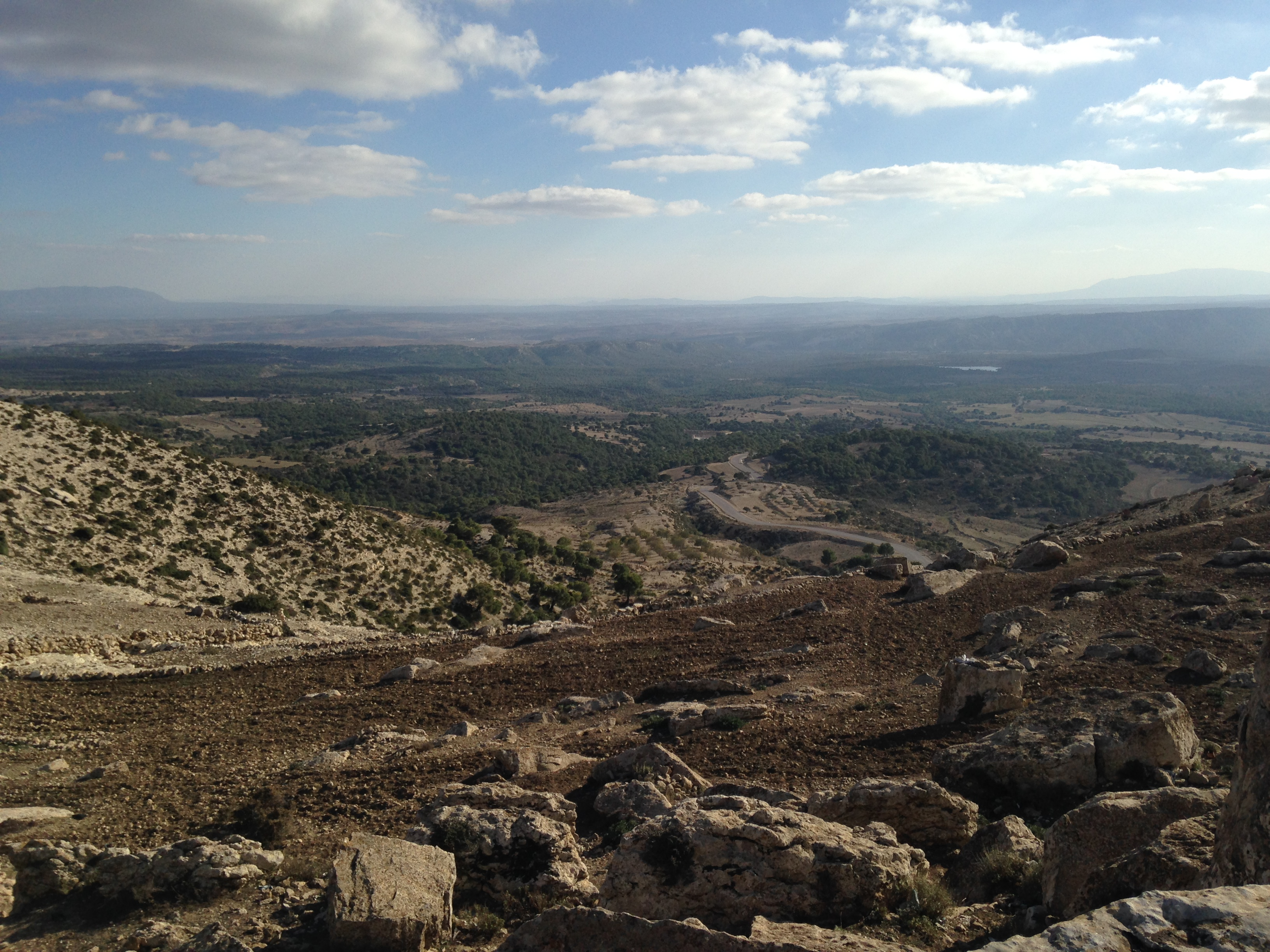
- Kesra, Tunisia
- Nickname: Cusira
- Interactive map of Kesra
- Country: Tunisia
- Governorate: Siliana Governorate
- Elevation: 3,169 ft (966 m)

Population (2014)
  - Total: 2,854
- Time zone: UTC+1 (CET)

Kesra is a town and commune in the Siliana Governorate, Tunisia. As of 2004 it had a population of 2,490. In 2014 this was 2,600. Kesra is in Siliana Governorate near Maktar at 35.8N and 9.36e. The town is at altitude of 966m and is near the Jebel Serj national park. During the Roman Empire Kesra was a civitas of the Roman Province of Byzacena called Cusira.

A flat bread made of Semolina is also called Kesra in north Africa.

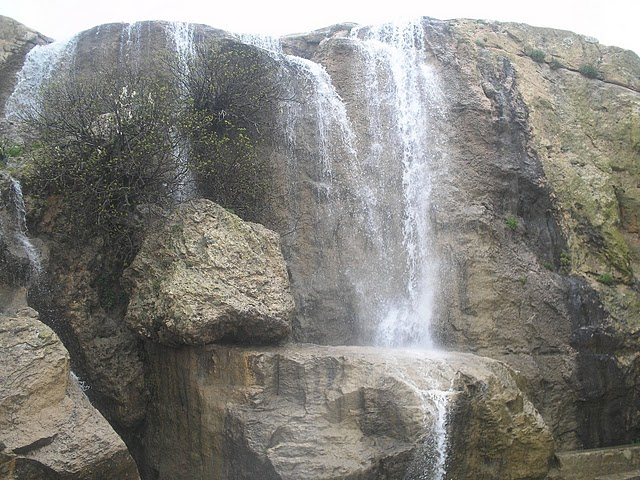
Kesra national park

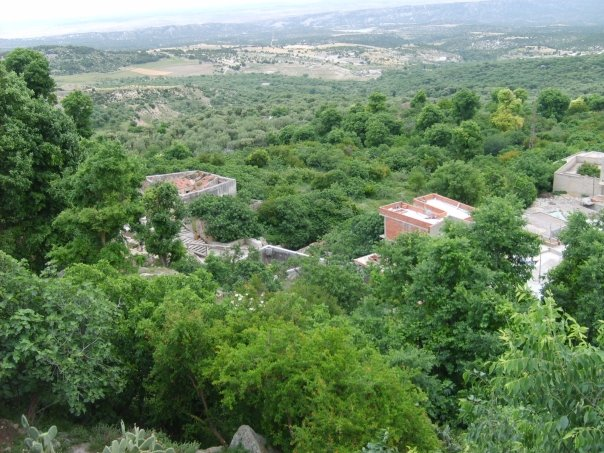
Kesra nature reserve

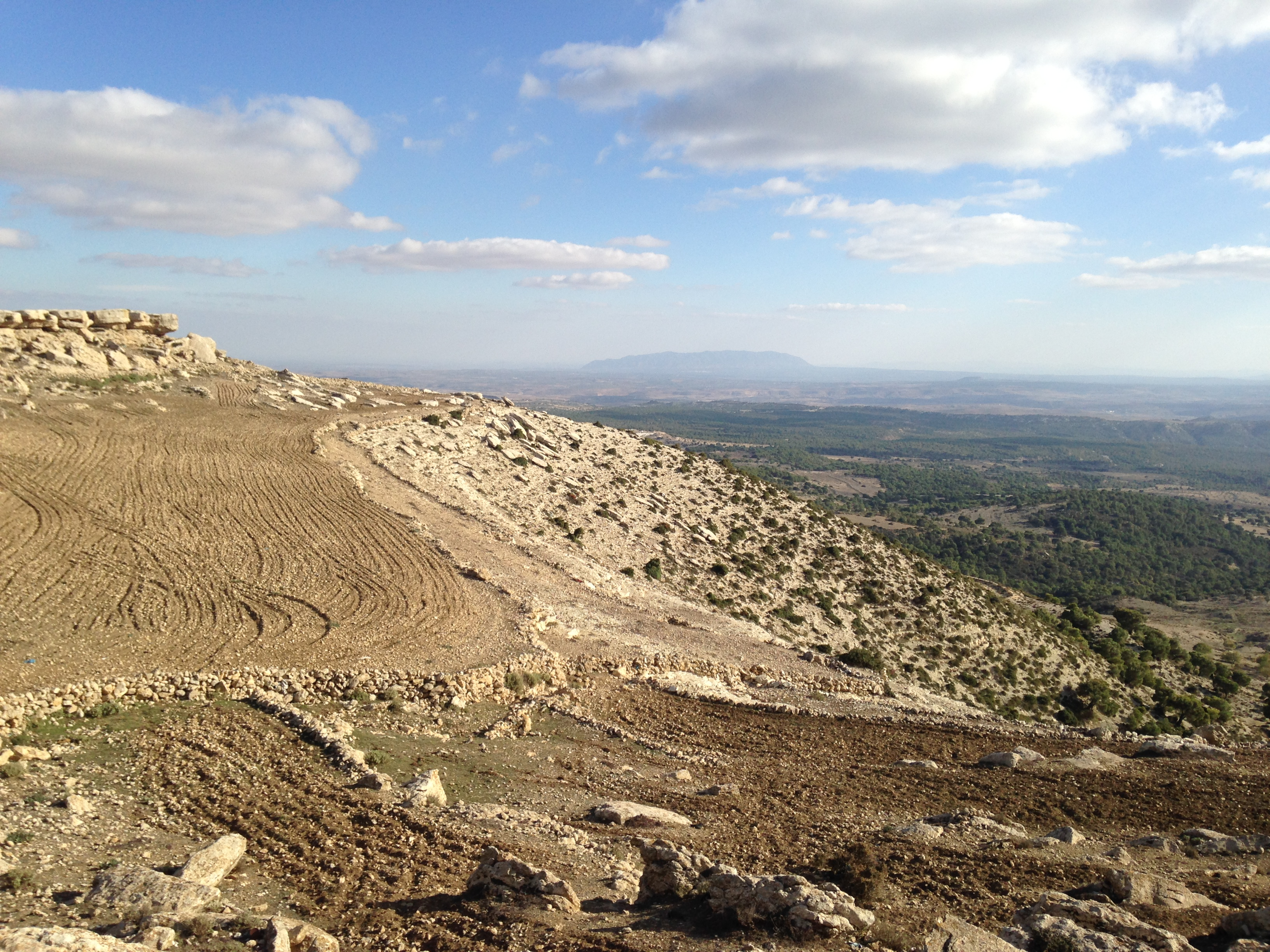
Panorama of Kesra

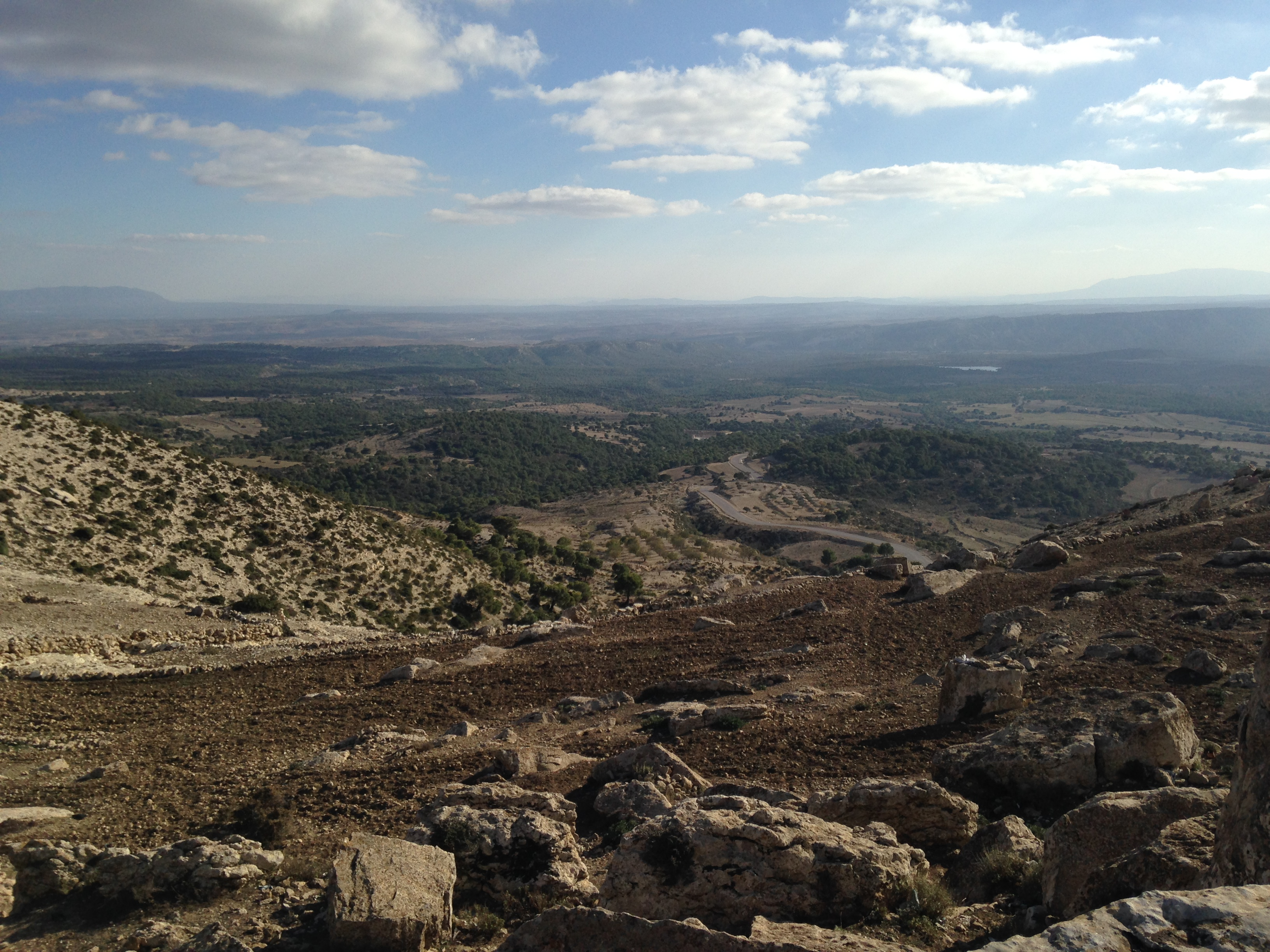
Panorama of Kesra

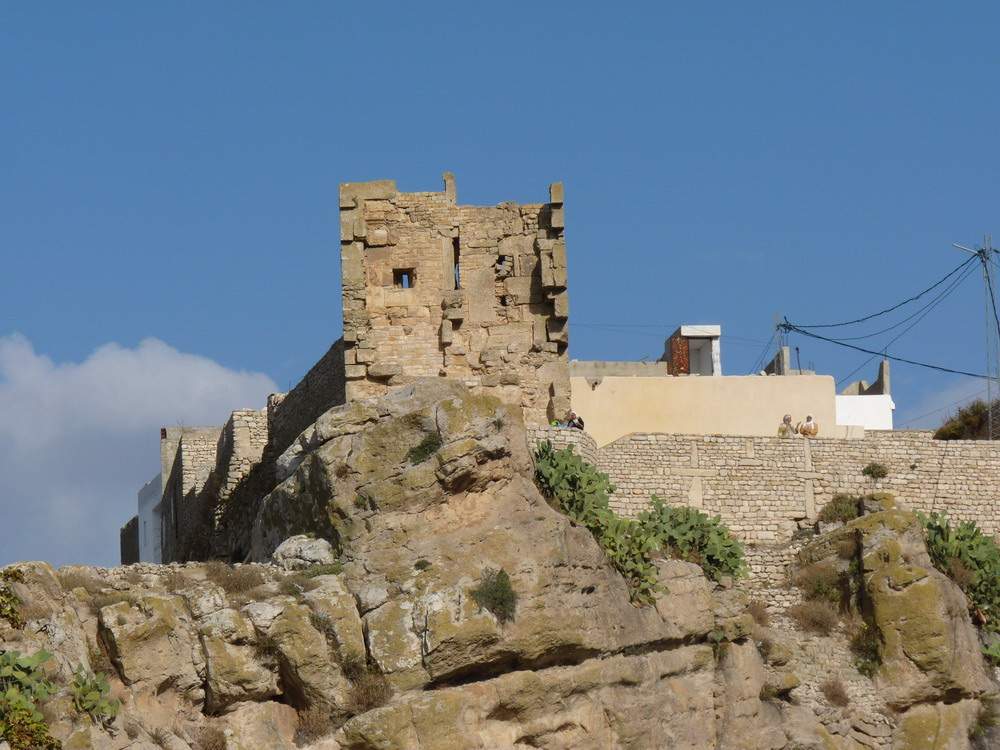
ruins of Kesra Castra.

== Population ==
2014 Census (Municipal)
Homes	Families	Males	Females	Total
888	739	1315	1414	2729

== See also ==
- List of cities in Tunisia
