= El Battan =

Coordinates: 36°49′N 9°50′E

El Battan البطان
- Commune and town
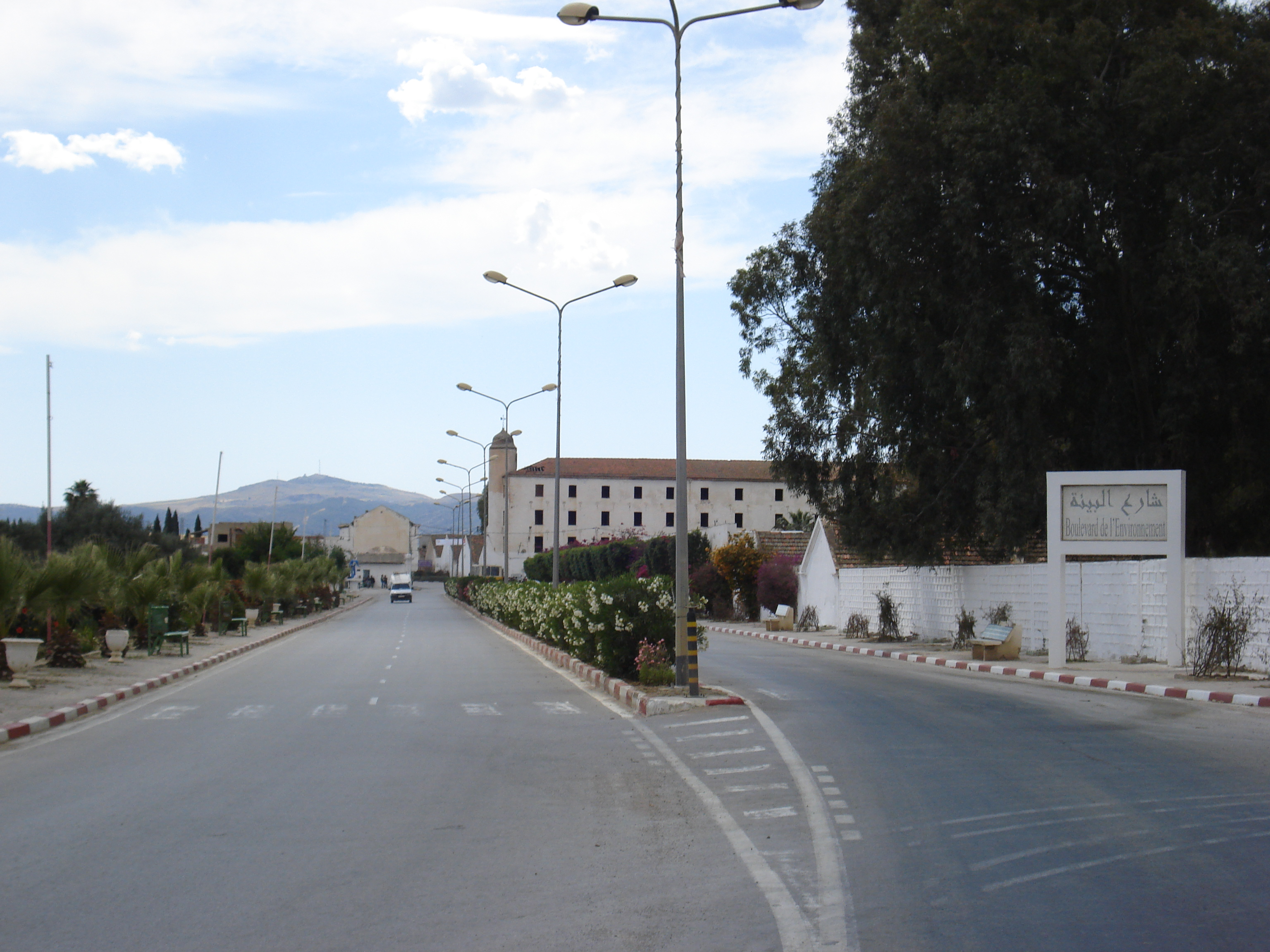
- Tebourba el-battan.
- Interactive map of El Battan
- Country: Tunisia
- Governorate: Manouba Governorate

Government
  - Mayor: Mabrouka Salhi (People’s Movement)

Population (2014)
  - Total: 6,458
- Time zone: UTC+1 (CET)

El Battan is a town and commune in the Manouba Governorate, Tunisia. As of 2004 it had a population of 5,761. Attached to the governorate of Manouba, it is a municipality with 5,761 inhabitants in 2004 and the capital of a delegation of 17,321 inhabitants.

El Batan is located at 36°48'13"N, 9°50'38"E, west of Tunis.

The city is in the center of a large plain where intensive irrigation is practiced. It is also known for the breeding of horses. There is a subsidiary of the National Foundation for the improvement of the horse race. During the French protectorate, El Battan was a strategic location for the settlement of farmers. French-style houses still exist there.

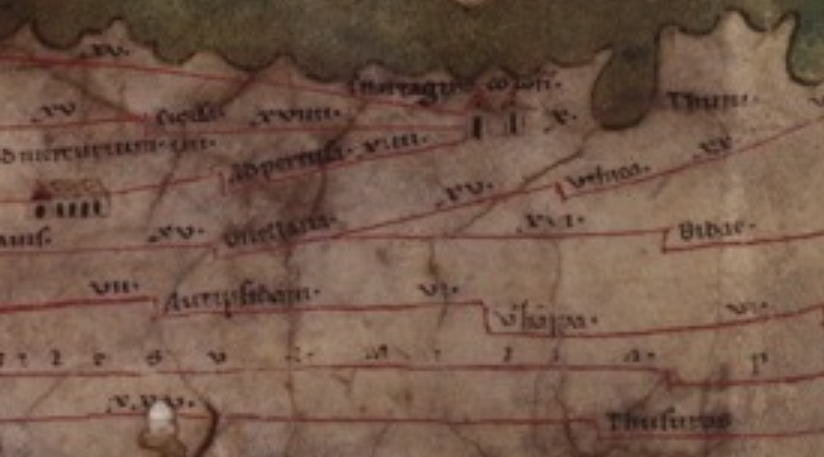
Extract of the Tabula Peutingeriana showing area around El Battan, during 4th century.

A bridge of Roman origin allows travelers to cross the Medjerda. Traditionally, washing and crushing of wool was practiced there, especially for the manufacture of the chechias.

The municipality of El Battan was established by Decree No. 819 of the year 1991, dated May 25, 1991.

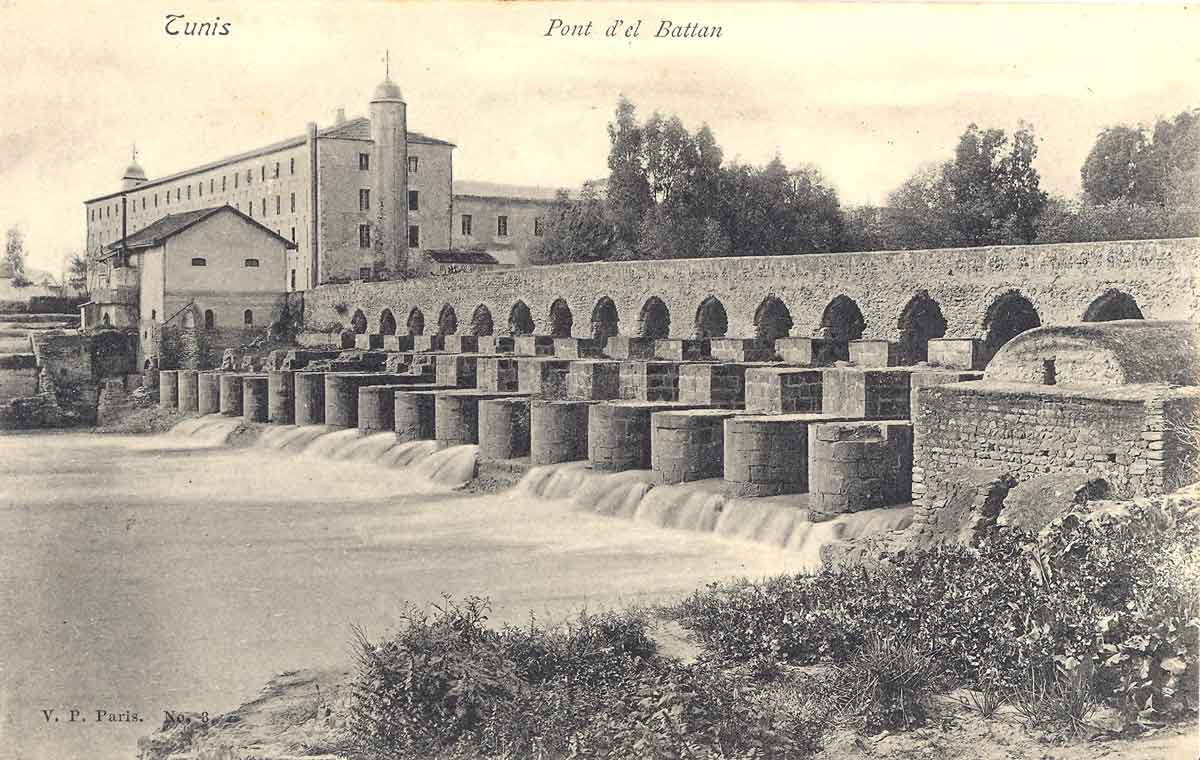
El Battan.

== Population ==
2014 Census (Municipal)
Homes	Families	Males	Females	Total
1784	1598	3217	3236	6453

== See also ==
- List of cities in Tunisia
