= Rouhia =

Coordinates: 35°39′N 9°03′E

Rouhia الروحية
- Commune and town
- Interactive map of Rouhia
- Country: Tunisia
- Governorate: Siliana Governorate

Population (2014)
  - Total: 4,688
- Time zone: UTC+1 (CET)

Rouhia or Er-Rouhia is a town and commune in the Siliana Governorate, Tunisia. In 2004, it had a population of 4,307.

== Population ==
2014 Census (Municipal)
Homes	Families	Males	Females	Total
1281	1176	2354	2321	4675

== See also ==
- List of cities in Tunisia
