= Manouba Governorate =

Governorate of Tunisia

Manouba Governorate ولاية منوبة
- Governorate
- Map of Tunisia with Manouba highlighted
- Coordinates: 36°48′28″N 10°6′4″E
- Country: Tunisia
- Created: 31 July 2000
- Capital: Manouba

Government
  - Governor: Mahmoud Chouaib (since 2024)

Area
  - Total: 1,137 km^{2} (439 sq mi)
  - Rank: Ranked 20th of 24

Population (2014)
  - Total: 379,518
  - Rank: Ranked 15th of 24
  - Density: 333.8/km^{2} (864.5/sq mi)
- Time zone: UTC+01 (CET)
- Postal prefix: xx
- ISO 3166 code: TN-14

Manouba Governorate (Arabic: ولاية منوبة Wilāyat Mannūbah pronounced [ˌmænˈnuːbæ]; French: Gouvernorat de la Manouba) is one of the twenty-four governorates (provinces) of Tunisia and is in inland, northern Tunisia. It has a population of 379,518 (as of the 2014 census), and an area of 1,137 km2. The capital is Manouba. The current governorate, created on July 31, 2000, brings together delegations that previously reported to the governorate of Ariana. It is part of Greater Tunis, along with the governorates of Tunis, Ariana, and Ben Arous.

== Geography ==
The governorate is 5.5 kilometres (3.4 mi) from the capital, in an area of foothills of and verdant plains below the Tell Atlas uplands and borders Bizerte, Zaghouan, Beja, Tunis, Ariana and Ben Arous Governorates. The east and west of the province have high foothills; from both ranges the three lakes of Tunis and the Bay of Tunis can be seen. The east part of the west range is named the Forest of Tebourba, one of its four largest settlements.

The average temperature is 18.7 °C or 65.7 °F and annual rainfall is 450 millimetres or 18 inches.

== Administrative divisions ==
Administratively, the governorate is divided into eight delegations (mutamadiyat), nine municipalities, eight rural councils and 47 imadas.

| Delegation | Population in 2004 | Population in 2014 |
|---|---|---|
| Borj El Amri | 16,184 | 17,408 |
| Djedeida | 40,327 | 44,748 |
| Douar Hicher | 75,959 | 84,090 |
| El Battan | 17,321 | 18,977 |
| Manouba | 51,398 | 58,792 |
| Mornaguia | 35,129 | 42,687 |
| Oued Ellil | 58,544 | 69,317 |
| Tebourba | 41,050 | 43,499 |

Nine municipalities are in Manouba Governorate:

| 1411 | Manouba | 37,287 |
| 1412 | Den Den | 25,658 |
| 1413 | Douar Hicher | 88,335 |
| 1414 | Oued Ellil | 81,040 |
| 1415 | Mornaguia | 31,296 |
| 1416 | Borj El Amri | 21,465 |
| 1417 | Djedeida | 52,713 |
| 1418 | Tebourba | 46,074 |
| 1419 | El Battan | 21,018 |
