= Mornaguia =

Mornaguia (المرناقية)
- Commune and town
- Location within Tunisia
- Coordinates: 36°46′N 10°01′E
- Country: Tunisia
- Governorate: Manouba Governorate

Population (2022)
  - Total: 23,100
- Time zone: UTC+1 (CET)
- Postal code: 1110

Mornaguia (Arabic: المرناقية) is a town and commune in the Manouba Governorate, Tunisia, located 14 kilometres from Tunis. As of 2004 it had a population of 13,382.

Attached administratively to the Manouba Governorate, it is a municipality with 19,834 inhabitants in 2014. The capital of a delegation, it is an important agricultural center for the fertile Mornag plain. Touched by the urban sprawl of the Tunis urban agglomeration, it is one of the cities with strong growth, especially since it is located on the Tunis-Medjez el-Bab A3 motorway.

It consists of several districts: Tebaltech, Bouhnach, Sidi Ali El Hattab, Ksar Hadid, El Fejja, Hmaiem, Menzel Habib, Bouregba and Tahouna.

It is also known for housing a civilian prison.

== See also ==
- List of cities in Tunisia
