= Siliana =

Siliana سليانة
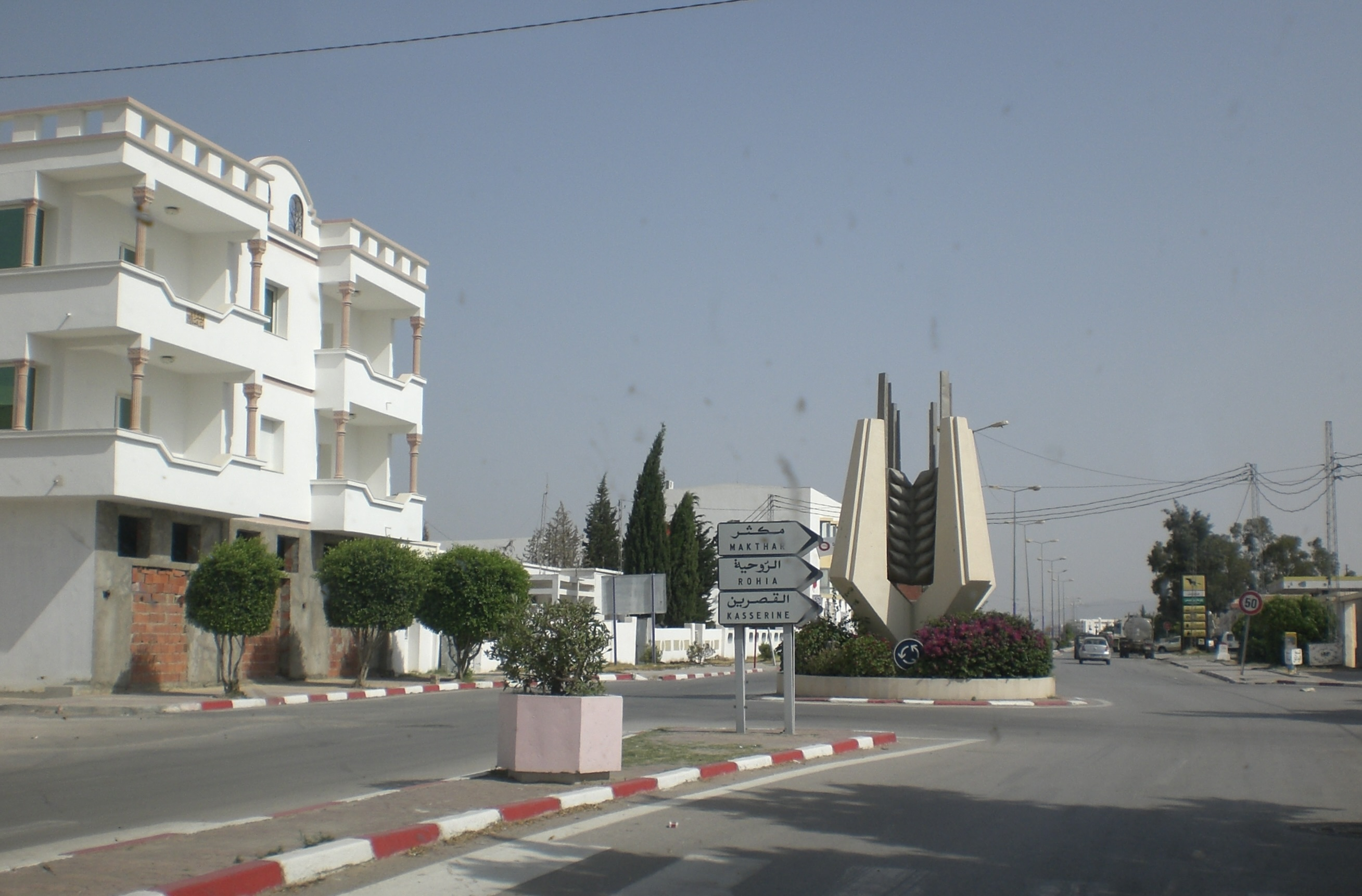

- Location in Tunisia
- Coordinates: 36°4′55″N 9°22′29″E
- Country: Tunisia
- Governorate: Siliana Governorate
- Delegation(s): Siliana North, Siliana South

Government
  - Mayor: Abdelhamid Hamami (Nidaa Tounes)

Population (2022)
  - Total: 35,951
- Time zone: UTC1 (CET)
- postal code: 6100
- Area code: 0021678

Siliana (Tunisian Arabic: سليانة Siliāna) is a modern farming town in northern Tunisia. It is located at around 36°4′55″N 9°22′29″E, 130 km south-west of the capital Tunis. It is the capital of the Siliana Governorate. It is located 10 kilometres (6.2 mi) away from Jama where the Battle of Zama occurred.

Siliana Dam is located 10 km north of the city of Siliana.

== History ==
During the Second Punic War, the Battle of Zama took place ten kilometers from Siliana. There was a Roman town at that location during the time of the Roman Empire, appearing on the 4th century Peutinger Map.

Modern Siliana was founded in 1905.

In April 1990 the Silianian people participated in the first Tunisian revolution against the police, the first Tunisian opposition to their government.

In November 2012, Siliana witnessed clashes between protesters for unemployment and the local police. Both Amnesty International and the UN High Commissioner for Human Rights, Navi Pillay called on the authorities to end the use of "excessive force".

== Neighborhoods ==
Siliana has 17 neighborhoods.

== Climate ==
Siliana has a cold semi-arid climate (Köppen climate classification BSk). In winter there is more rainfall than in summer. The average annual temperature in Siliana is 16.9 °C (62.4 °F). About 423 mm (16.65 in) of precipitation falls annually.

Climate data for Siliana (1991–2020, extremes 1953–2024)
| Month | Jan | Feb | Mar | Apr | May | Jun | Jul | Aug | Sep | Oct | Nov | Dec | Year |
|---|---|---|---|---|---|---|---|---|---|---|---|---|---|
| Record high °C (°F) | 26.6 (79.9) | 32.6 (90.7) | 36.2 (97.2) | 36.4 (97.5) | 43.3 (109.9) | 45.8 (114.4) | 46.9 (116.4) | 46.1 (115.0) | 43.0 (109.4) | 40.0 (104.0) | 30.8 (87.4) | 31.3 (88.3) | 46.9 (116.4) |
| Mean daily maximum °C (°F) | 14.4 (57.9) | 15.1 (59.2) | 18.3 (64.9) | 21.7 (71.1) | 27.2 (81.0) | 32.8 (91.0) | 36.2 (97.2) | 36.1 (97.0) | 30.5 (86.9) | 25.9 (78.6) | 19.8 (67.6) | 15.7 (60.3) | 24.5 (76.1) |
| Daily mean °C (°F) | 9.3 (48.7) | 9.5 (49.1) | 12.0 (53.6) | 14.8 (58.6) | 19.5 (67.1) | 24.2 (75.6) | 27.3 (81.1) | 27.6 (81.7) | 23.6 (74.5) | 19.7 (67.5) | 14.3 (57.7) | 10.6 (51.1) | 17.7 (63.9) |
| Mean daily minimum °C (°F) | 4.2 (39.6) | 4.0 (39.2) | 5.7 (42.3) | 7.9 (46.2) | 11.7 (53.1) | 15.7 (60.3) | 18.5 (65.3) | 19.2 (66.6) | 16.8 (62.2) | 13.4 (56.1) | 8.8 (47.8) | 5.5 (41.9) | 10.9 (51.6) |
| Record low °C (°F) | −6.5 (20.3) | −4.0 (24.8) | −4.0 (24.8) | −1.4 (29.5) | 1.0 (33.8) | 5.0 (41.0) | 10.5 (50.9) | 9.4 (48.9) | 8.0 (46.4) | 3.0 (37.4) | −2.0 (28.4) | −4.4 (24.1) | −6.5 (20.3) |
| Average precipitation mm (inches) | 55.1 (2.17) | 37.2 (1.46) | 48.2 (1.90) | 42.8 (1.69) | 37.1 (1.46) | 18.4 (0.72) | 11.5 (0.45) | 25.5 (1.00) | 56.1 (2.21) | 43.2 (1.70) | 38.7 (1.52) | 40.4 (1.59) | 454.4 (17.89) |
| Average precipitation days (≥ 1.0 mm) | 6.8 | 6.5 | 6.5 | 5.9 | 4.9 | 2.8 | 1.7 | 2.7 | 6.0 | 5.1 | 5.2 | 6.0 | 60.2 |
| Average relative humidity (%) | 74 | 71 | 72 | 66 | 62 | 55 | 48 | 54 | 60 | 67 | 71 | 74 | 65 |
| Mean monthly sunshine hours | 150.0 | 163.2 | 209.5 | 224.7 | 280.8 | 307.8 | 355.9 | 317.8 | 240.2 | 205.6 | 168.8 | 145.0 | 2,769.3 |
Source 1: Institut National de la Météorologie (humidity 1961-1990, sun 1981–2010) (Note: The Station ID for Siliana is 23434111.)
Source 2: NOAA

== Sports ==
Siliana is the home of USS (Union Siliana Sport), a football team that was founded in 1955.

== Education ==
There is one college in Siliana: "Isetsl"

== Gallery ==
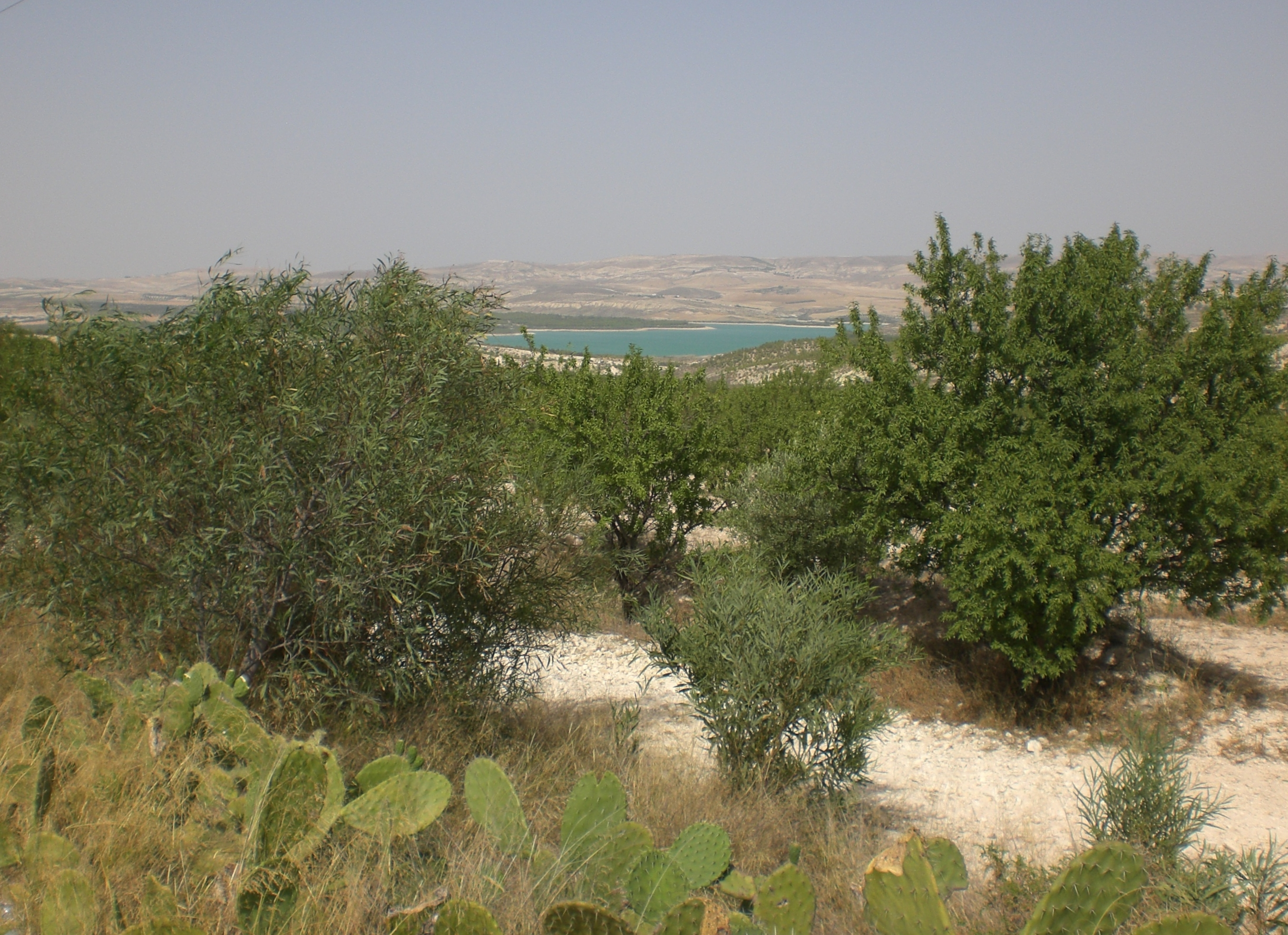

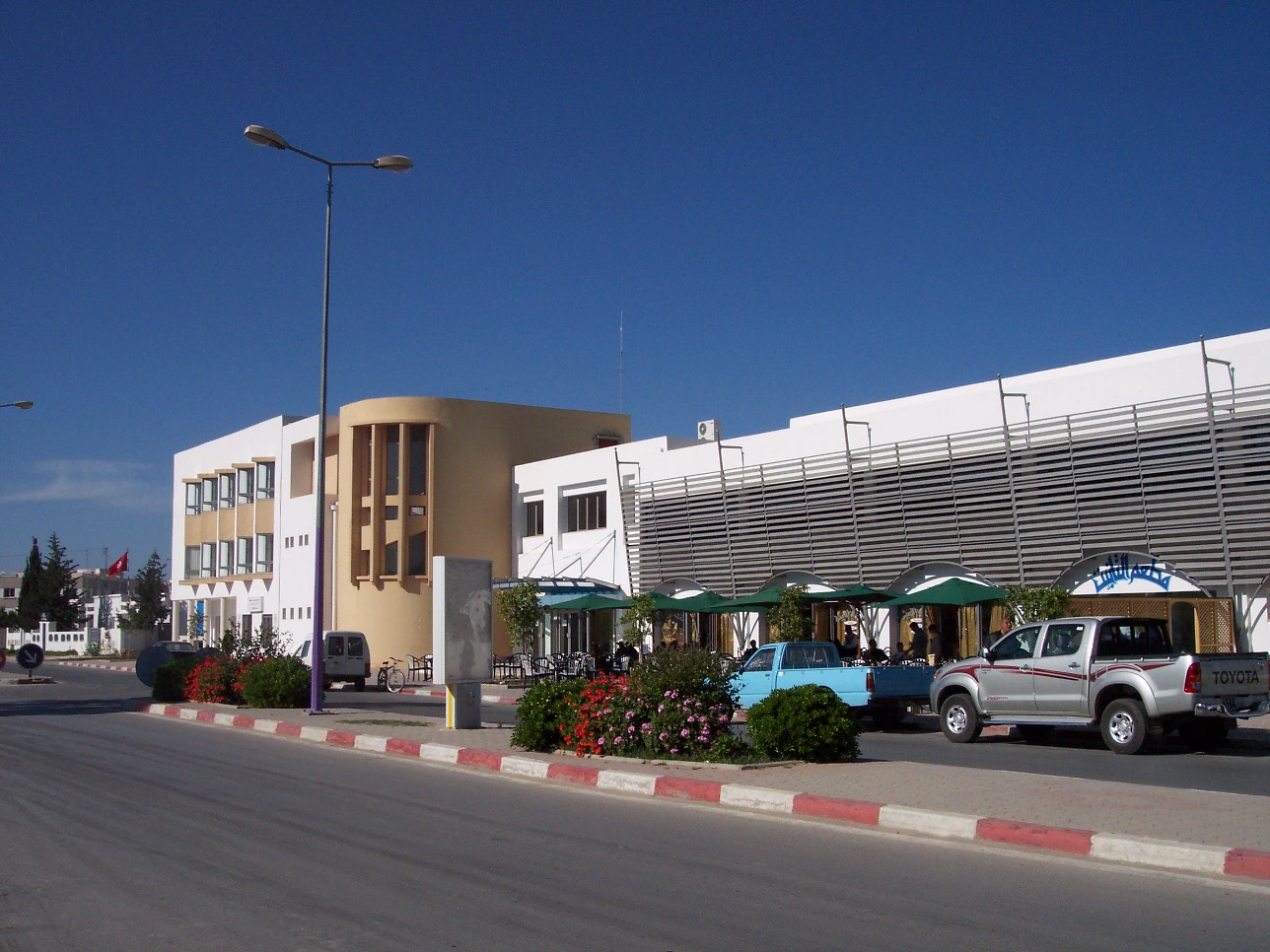

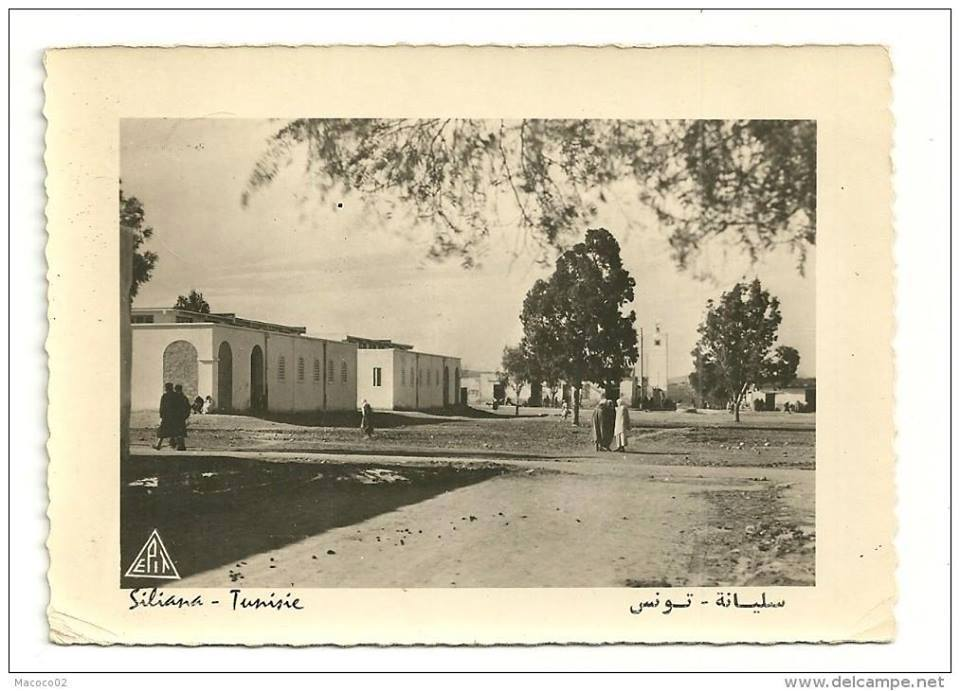
