= Den Den =

Den Den الدندان
- Commune and town
- Interactive map of Den Den
- Coordinates: 36°48′08″N 10°06′38″E
- Country: Tunisia
- Governorate: Manouba Governorate
- Delegation(s): Manouba

Government
  - Mayor: Nourhane Bouanane (Ennahda)

Population (2022)
  - Total: 30,293
- Time zone: UTC+1 (CET)

Den Den, (Arabic: الدندان) is a town and commune in the Manouba Governorate, Tunisia, part of the western banlieue of Tunis. As of 2022, it had a population of 30,293. This population count includes both Den Den and the town of Ksar Saïd. Formerly mainly devoted to farming as located within the part of Tunisia suitable for market gardening, it has been progressively integrated in the Tunisian urban area. Within the city are located several palaces who belonged to the Beys of Tunis of the Husainid dynasty, they were used as winter residences. The most lavish one, the Zarrouk palace, named after minister Mohamed Larbi Zarrouk, is still in use for various entertainment purposes. A craft village aiming to promote Tunisian handicraft was also built in the commune by the National Office of Tunisian Handicrafts

During the Algerian War, the National Liberation Front establishes a prison there where it incarcerated its political opponents, French film director René Vautier was imprisoned there for several months.

The Ksar Saïd Hippodrome is also located within the commune.

== See also ==
- List of cities in Tunisia
