= Gaâfour =

Gaâfour قعفور - ڨعفور
- Commune and town
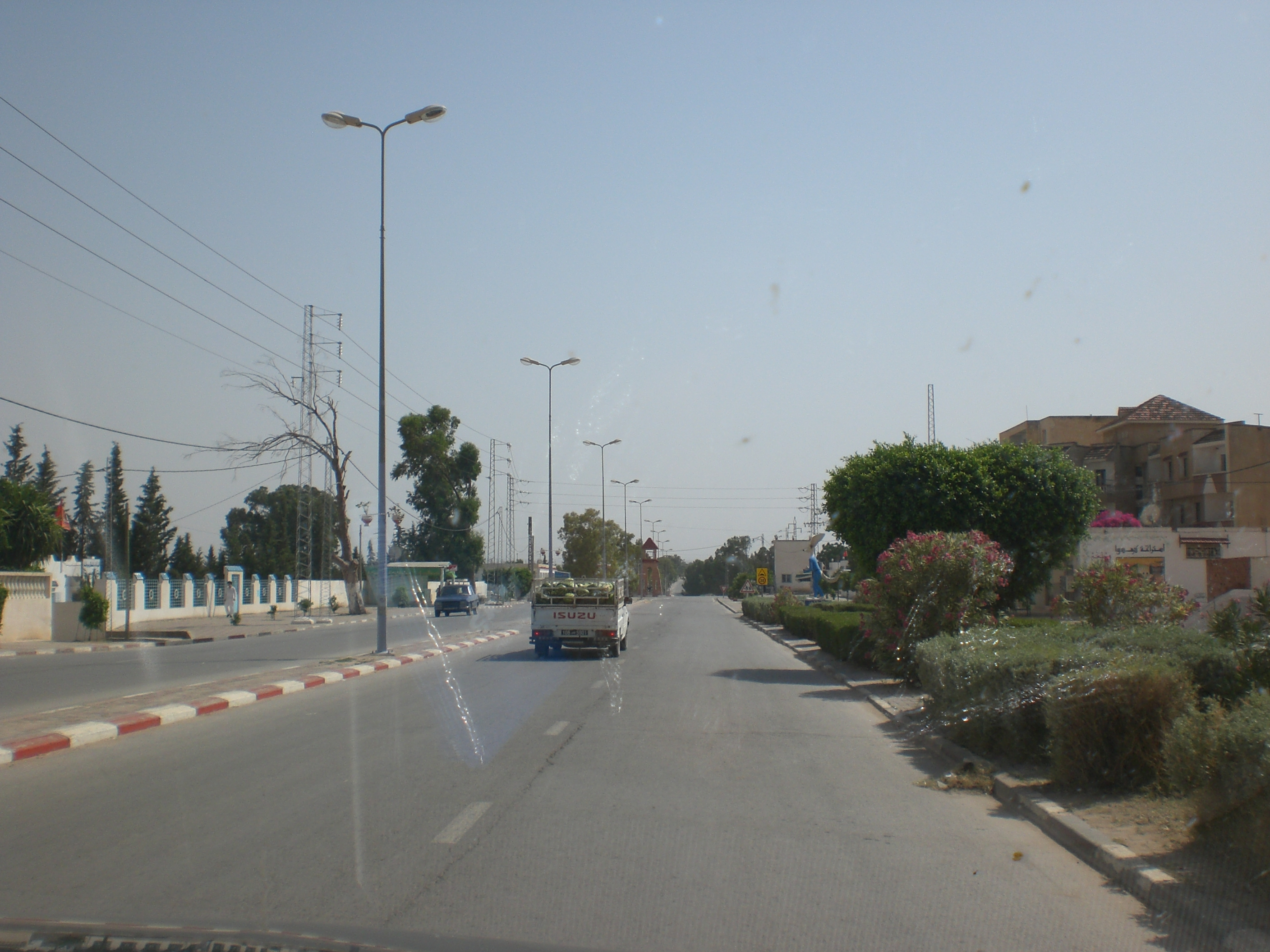
- Interactive map of Gaâfour
- Coordinates: 36°20′24″N 9°19′12″E
- Country: Tunisia
- Governorate: Siliana Governorate

Government
  - Mayor: Moez Oueslati (Popular Front)

Population (2014)
  - Total: 10,272
- Time zone: UTC+1 (CET)

Gaâfour (Arabic: قعفور, Tunisian Arabic: ڨعفور) is a town and commune in the Siliana Governorate, north-western Tunisia, located 120 kilometers southwest of Tunis. It is attached to Siliana. As of 2004 it had a population of 9,358 people.

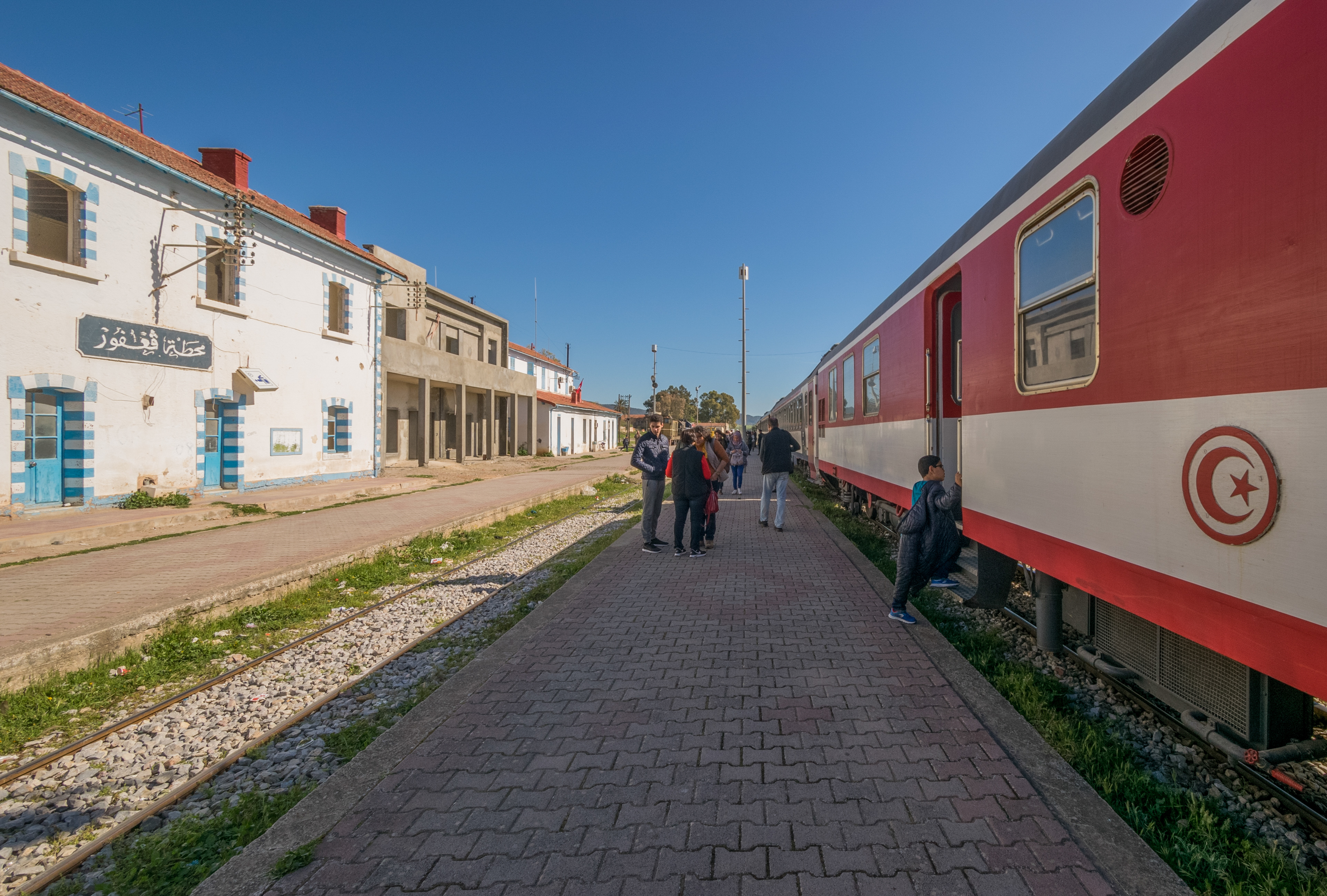
Rail station of Gaâfour

The town has a station located on the railway linking Tunis to Kalaat Khasba.

== See also ==
- List of cities in Tunisia
