= Sers, Tunisia =

Sers
- Commune and town
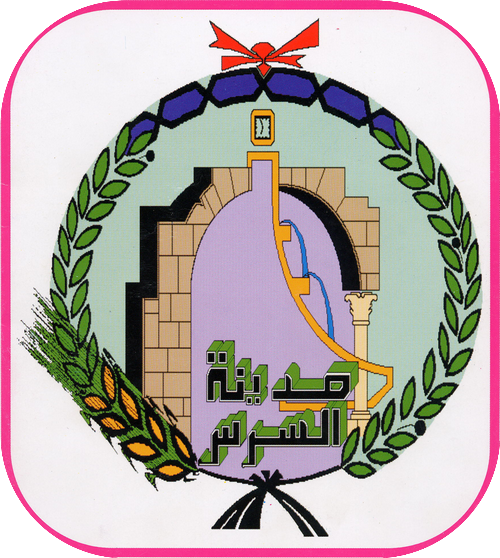
- Coat of arms

- Location within Tunisia
- Coordinates: 36°5′N 9°1′E
- Country: Tunisia
- Governorate: El Kef Governorate

Population (2014)
  - Total: 12,137
- Time zone: UTC+1 (CET)
- Website: www.commune-sers.gov.tn

Sers, also Le Sers or Es Sers, is a town and commune in the El Kef Governorate, Tunisia. It is located 35.5 kilometres (22.1 mi) by road southeast of El Kef. As of 2004 it had a population of 11,927. Its economic activity is mainly dominated by agriculture, including cereal production.

It is located at the foot of Jebel Maiza (887 m), which is part of the Tunisian ridge. It is described as a "French railway town sitting in the middle of a vast natural bowl that contains some of the most fertile land in the country." Its past dates back to antiquity, when it was the capital of the kingdom known as Zama Regia. Following the defeat of the Carthaginians at the Battle of Zama, Zama Regia was romanized as Thusca.

Sers has a local football team, Wided Sportif Sers. It currently plays in the 2nd football professional league.

== See also ==
- List of cities in Tunisia
