= Oued Ellil =

Coordinates: 36°50′N 10°03′E

Oued Ellil وادي الليل
- Commune and town
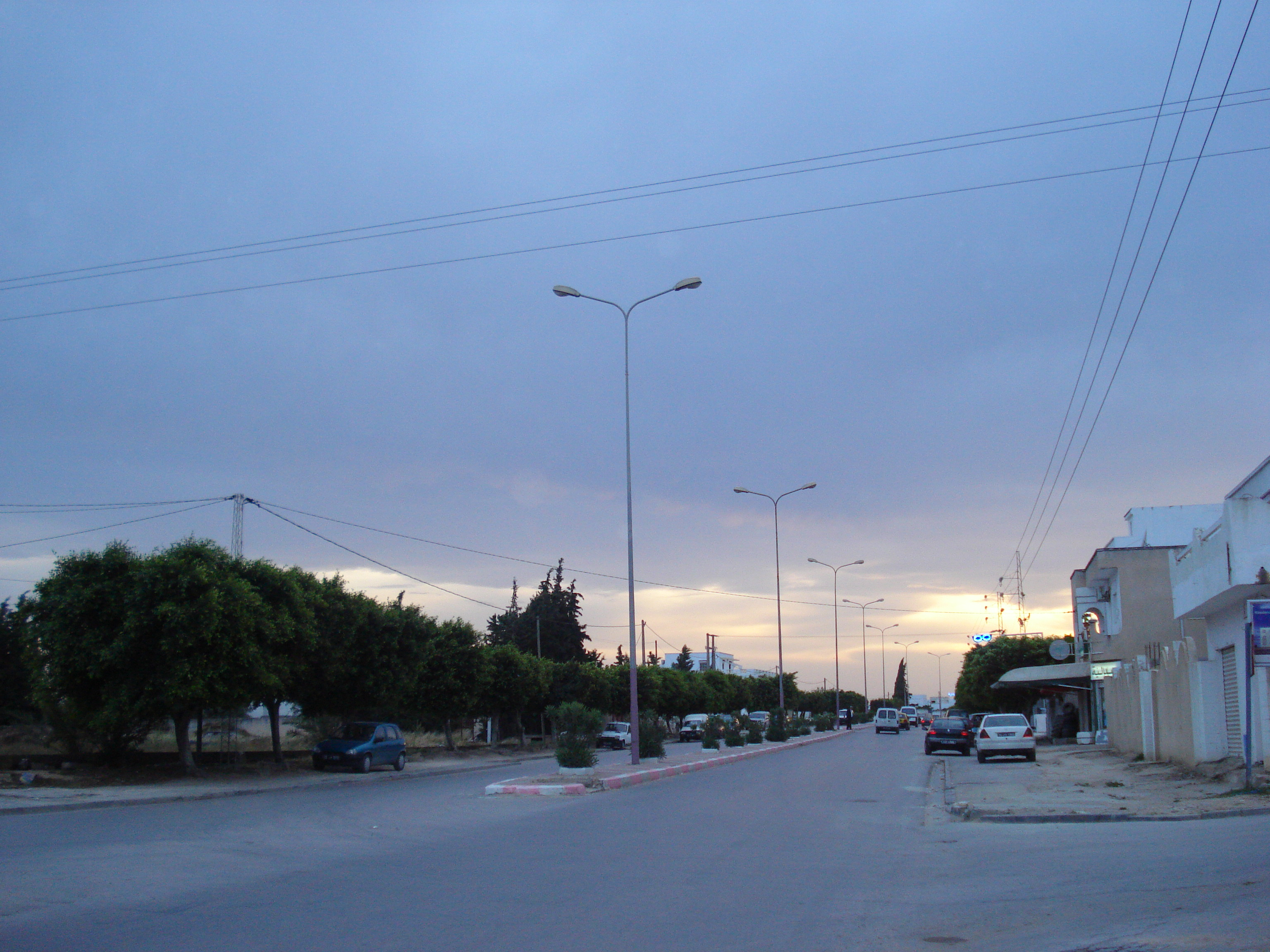
- Oued Ellil entrance
- Interactive map of Oued Ellil
- Country: Tunisia
- Governorate: Manouba Governorate

Population (2022)
  - Total: 66,100
- Time zone: UTC+1 (CET)

Oued Ellil is a town and commune in the Manouba Governorate, Tunisia. As of 2004, it had a population of 47,614.

== See also ==
- List of cities in Tunisia
