= Siliana Governorate =

Governorate of Tunisia

Siliana ولاية سليانة
- Governorate
- Map of Tunisia with Siliana highlighted

- Subdivisions of Siliana Governorate
- Coordinates: 36°10′N 9°22′E
- Country: Tunisia
- Created: 5 June 1974
- Capital: Siliana

Government
  - Governor: Khaled Ouaari (since 2024)

Area
  - Total: 4,642 km^{2} (1,792 sq mi)
  - Rank: Ranked 12th of 24

Population (2014)
  - Total: 223,087
  - Rank: Ranked 20th of 24
  - Density: 48.06/km^{2} (124.5/sq mi)
- Time zone: UTC+01 (CET)
- Postal prefix: xx
- ISO 3166 code: TN-34

Siliana Governorate (Tunisian Arabic: ولاية سليانة Wilāyat Silyānah pronounced [sɪ̈lˈje̞ːnə]; French: Gouvernorat de Siliana) is one of the twenty-four governorates (provinces) of Tunisia, is landlocked and is in the north of the country. It covers an area of 4,631 km^{2} and has a population of 223,087 (2014 census). The capital is Siliana. The Siliana governorate is surrounded by seven other governorates: the governorate of Béja to the northeast, Jendouba to the northwest, Kef to the west, Zaghouan and Kairouan to the east, and Kasserine and Sidi Bouzid to the south, allowing it to serve as a crossing point between the northwest, central, and southern regions of the country.

== Geography ==
The province is coextensive with the upper Oued Siliana (Siliana river) catchment which flows north. The land includes a largely fertile valley, tributary valleys, and rocky and forested uplands. It generally slopes north. The south of the governorate tapers in a curve to include the three main peaks at the head of the valley in the dorsal Atlas Mountains. Shortly after leaving the governorate, the Oued Siliana feeds into the valley of the Medjerda River, which flows east. Two main settlements are beside the river: Siliana and Gaafour (Qa Afur). Two forested ridges form national parks mainly within and outside the north-west and south-east borders respectively. The higher of these is the Djebel Serj to the south east. The Siliana Barrage, below the city, is an artificial reservoir and is the largest lake in the province, followed by the Lakhmess Barrage in the south-east, which is less than a third of its size. The climate is more Mediterranean than desert, as it is near the coast (see Tunisia§Climate) with temperatures in all but the northern borders moderated by its high elevation.

== Administrative divisions ==
Ten municipalities are in Siliana Governorate:

2411	Siliana	46,204
2412	Bou Arada	19,373
2413	Gaâfour	15,801
2414	El Krib	20,000
2415	Sidi Bou Rouis	11,655
2416	Maktar	28,321
2417	Rouhia	20,357
2418	Kesra	15,031
2419	Bargou	11,505
2420	El Aroussa	8,839
	El Hababsa	6,706
	Sidi Morched	12,550
