= Djedeida =

Coordinates: 36°50′N 9°55′E

- Commune and town
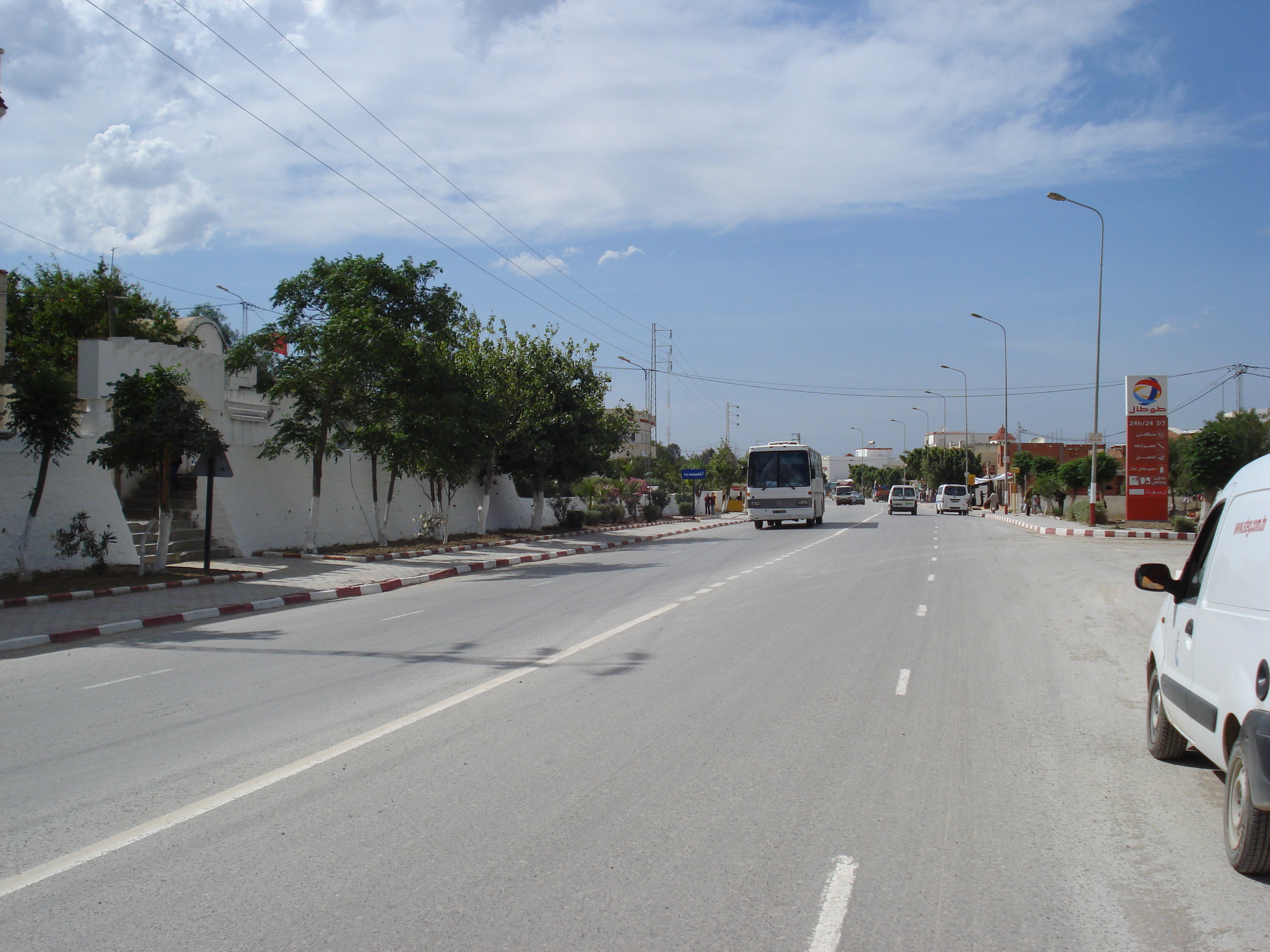
- Interactive map of Djedeida
- Country: Tunisia
- Governorate: Manouba Governorate

Population (2014)
  - Total: 45,000
- Time zone: UTC+1 (CET)

Djedeida is a town and commune in the Manouba Governorate, Tunisia. It is about 25 km west of Tunis. As of 2021 it had a population of 45,000.

== See also ==
- List of cities in Tunisia
