= Bou Arada =

Coordinates: 36°21′N 9°37′E

Bou Arada بوعرادة
- Commune and town
- Interactive map of Bou Arada
- Country: Tunisia
- Governorate: Siliana Governorate

Population (2014)
  - Total: 13,170
- Time zone: UTC+1 (CET)

Bou Arada is a town and commune in the Siliana Governorate, Tunisia. As of 2004 it had a population of 12,273. It has been identified with the ancient Roman city of Aradi.

== Climate ==
In Bou Arada, there is a local steppe climate. In winter there is more rainfall than in summer. The Köppen-Geiger climate classification is BSk. The average annual temperature in Bou Arada is 17.5 °C (63.5 °F). About 446 mm (17.56 in) of precipitation falls annually.

Climate data for Bou Arada
Month	Jan	Feb	Mar	Apr	May	Jun	Jul	Aug	Sep	Oct	Nov	Dec	Year
Mean daily maximum °C (°F)	13.6 (56.5)	15.2 (59.4)	18.0 (64.4)	21.3 (70.3)	26.0 (78.8)	31.1 (88.0)	35.0 (95.0)	34.4 (93.9)	30.5 (86.9)	25.1 (77.2)	19.7 (67.5)	15.1 (59.2)	23.8 (74.8)
Mean daily minimum °C (°F)	4.2 (39.6)	4.4 (39.9)	6.6 (43.9)	9.0 (48.2)	12.3 (54.1)	16.8 (62.2)	18.7 (65.7)	18.9 (66.0)	16.9 (62.4)	13.3 (55.9)	8.7 (47.7)	5.5 (41.9)	11.3 (52.3)
Average precipitation mm (inches)	61 (2.4)	54 (2.1)	49 (1.9)	38 (1.5)	28 (1.1)	17 (0.7)	6 (0.2)	11 (0.4)	36 (1.4)	46 (1.8)	43 (1.7)	57 (2.2)	446 (17.6)
Source: Climate-Data.org, Climate data

== See also ==
- List of cities in Tunisia
