= El Aroussa =

Coordinates: 36°23′N 9°27′E

El Aroussa العروسة
- Commune and town
- Interactive map of El Aroussa
- Country: Tunisia
- Governorate: Siliana Governorate

Government
  - Mayor: Chawki Riahi (Popular Front)

Population (2014)
  - Total: 2,925
- Time zone: UTC+1 (CET)

El Aroussa is a town and commune in the Siliana Governorate, Tunisia. As of 2004, it had a population of 2,621.

== Population ==
2014 Census (Municipal)
Homes	Families	Males	Females	Total
823	764	1373	1532	2905

== See also ==
- List of cities in Tunisia
