= North West Tunisia =

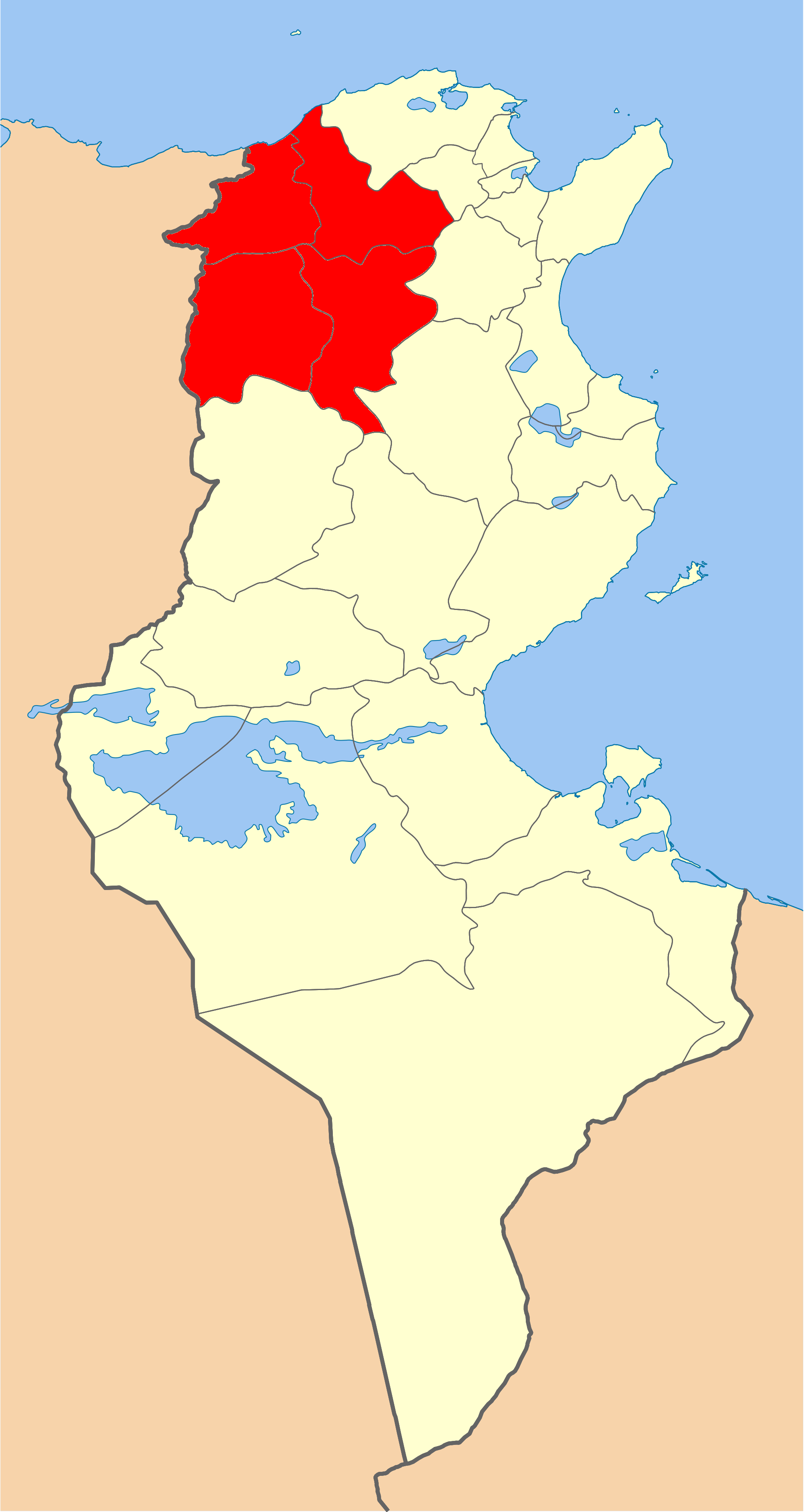
Map of the region.

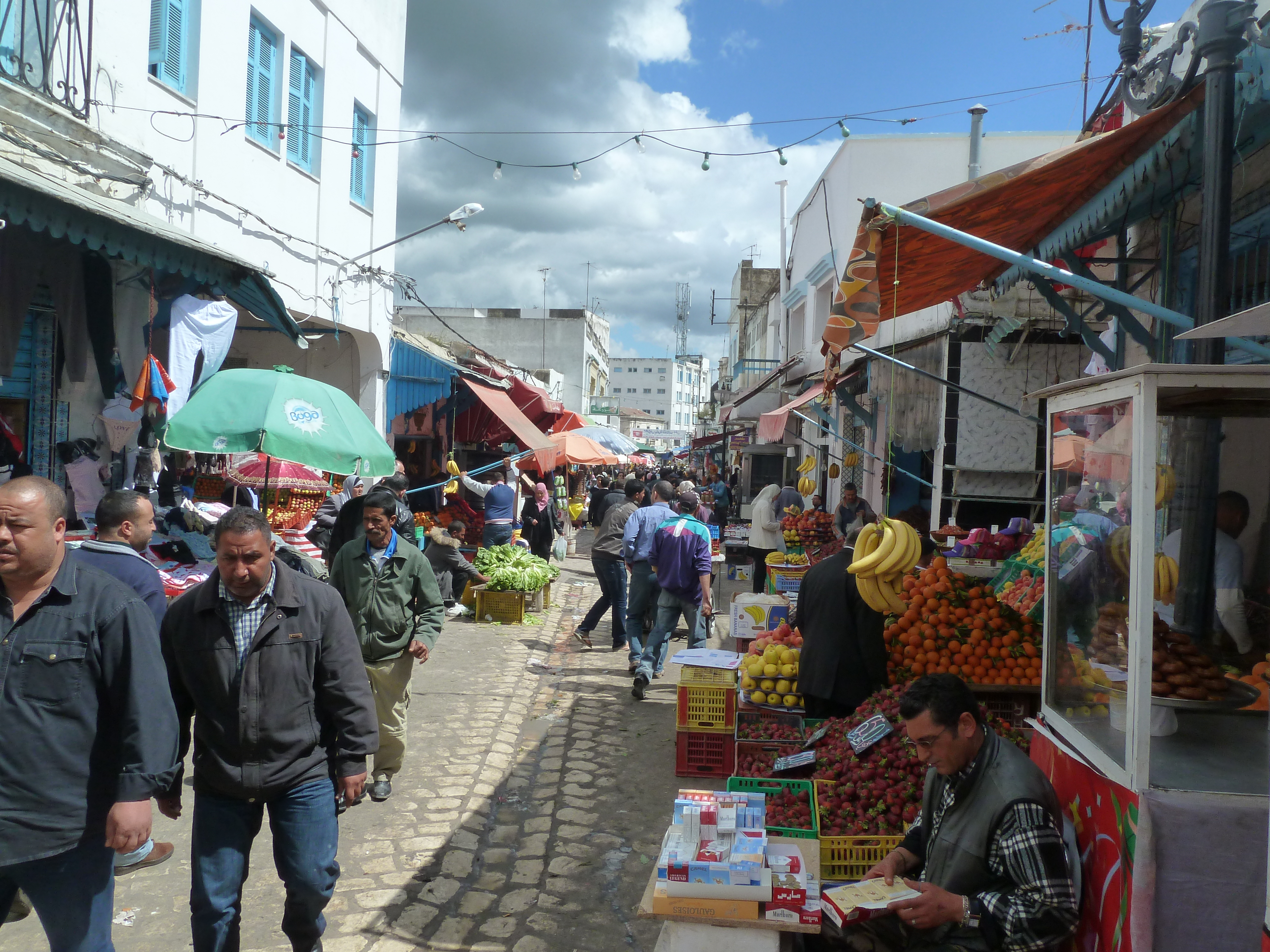
A market in the center of the city of Béja.

North West Tunisia (Arabic : الشمال الغربي التونسي ) is one of the six geographic and economic regions of Tunisia, consisting of four governorates: Béja, Kef, Siliana and Jendouba. The region had a population of 1,170,752 representing 12.2% of the total population of Tunisia. This makes it the 5th-most populous region in the country, with only South West Tunisia being smaller.

== Geography ==
The North West region is located in the extreme north of the country, bounded to the west by the Tunisian-Algerian border and to the east by Grand Tunis and the North East region. In the north, the region is bounded by the Mediterranean Sea (with a 51 km long coast) and Bizerte Governorate and to the south by the Central West Region.

The region is divided in half by the Medjerda River which is the longest river in the country. The North West is characterized by its unique forests and mountains (the Kroumirie and Mogod Mountains), coral coasts and the large plains.

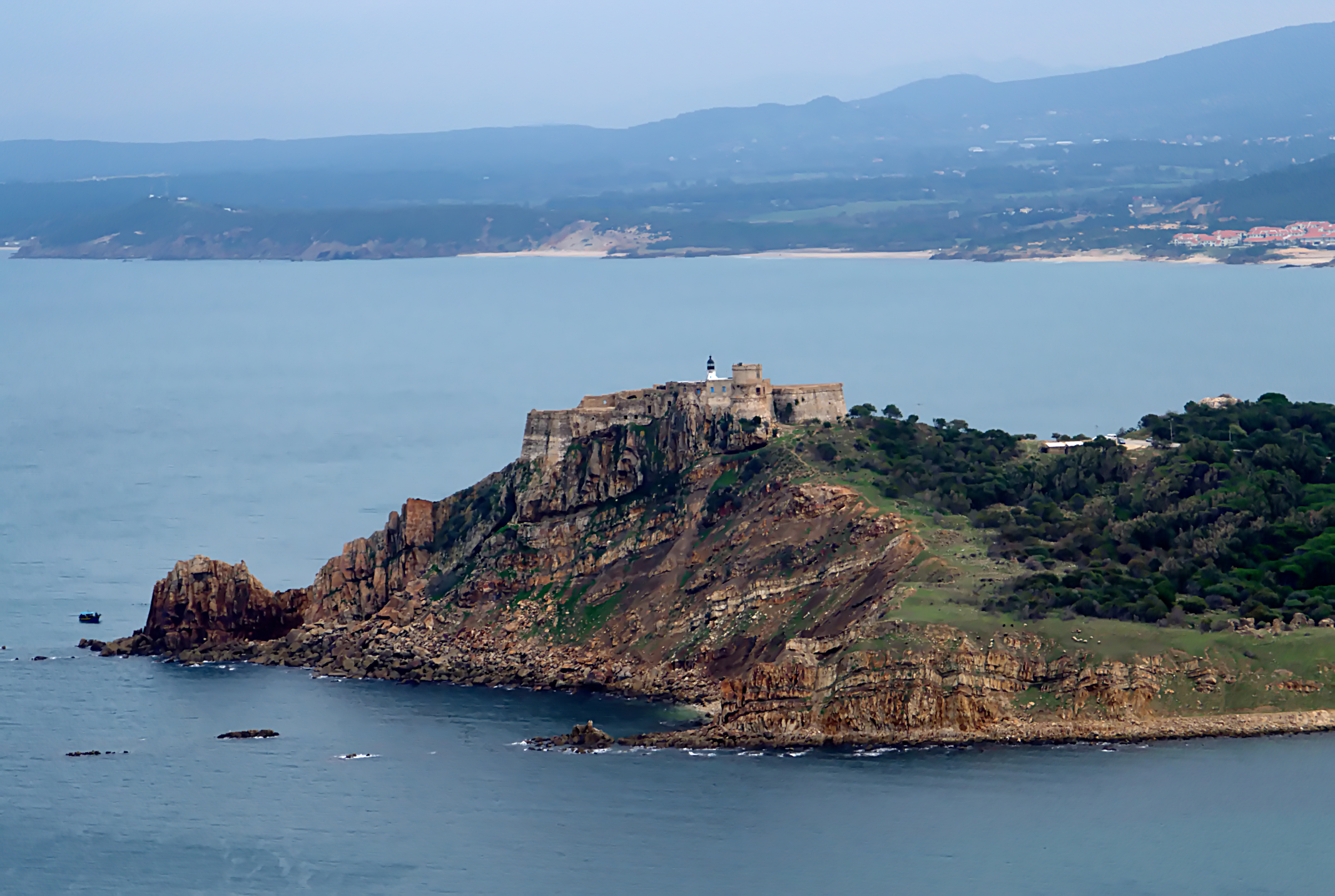
Tabarka Coast

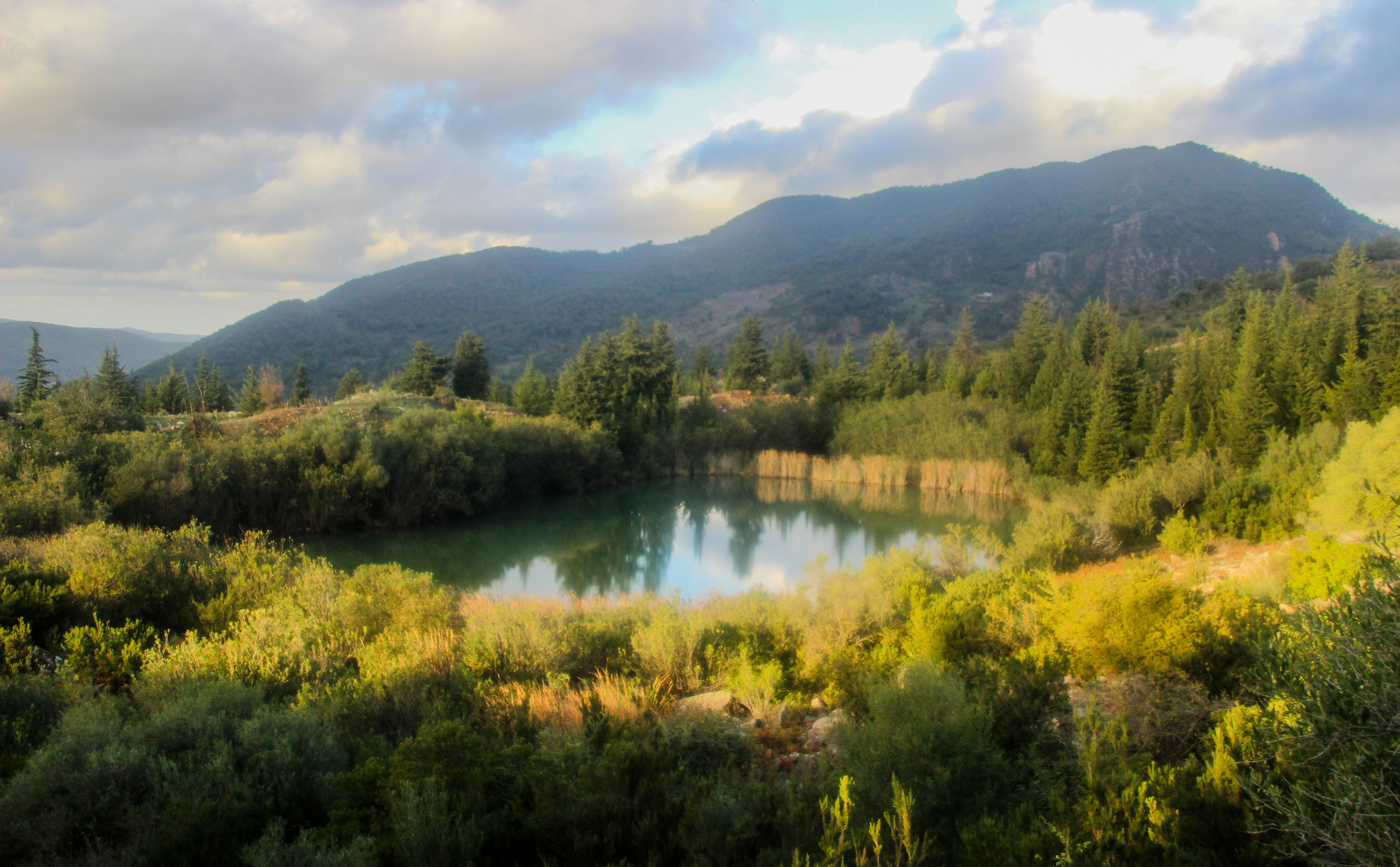
A small lake in Ain Drahem

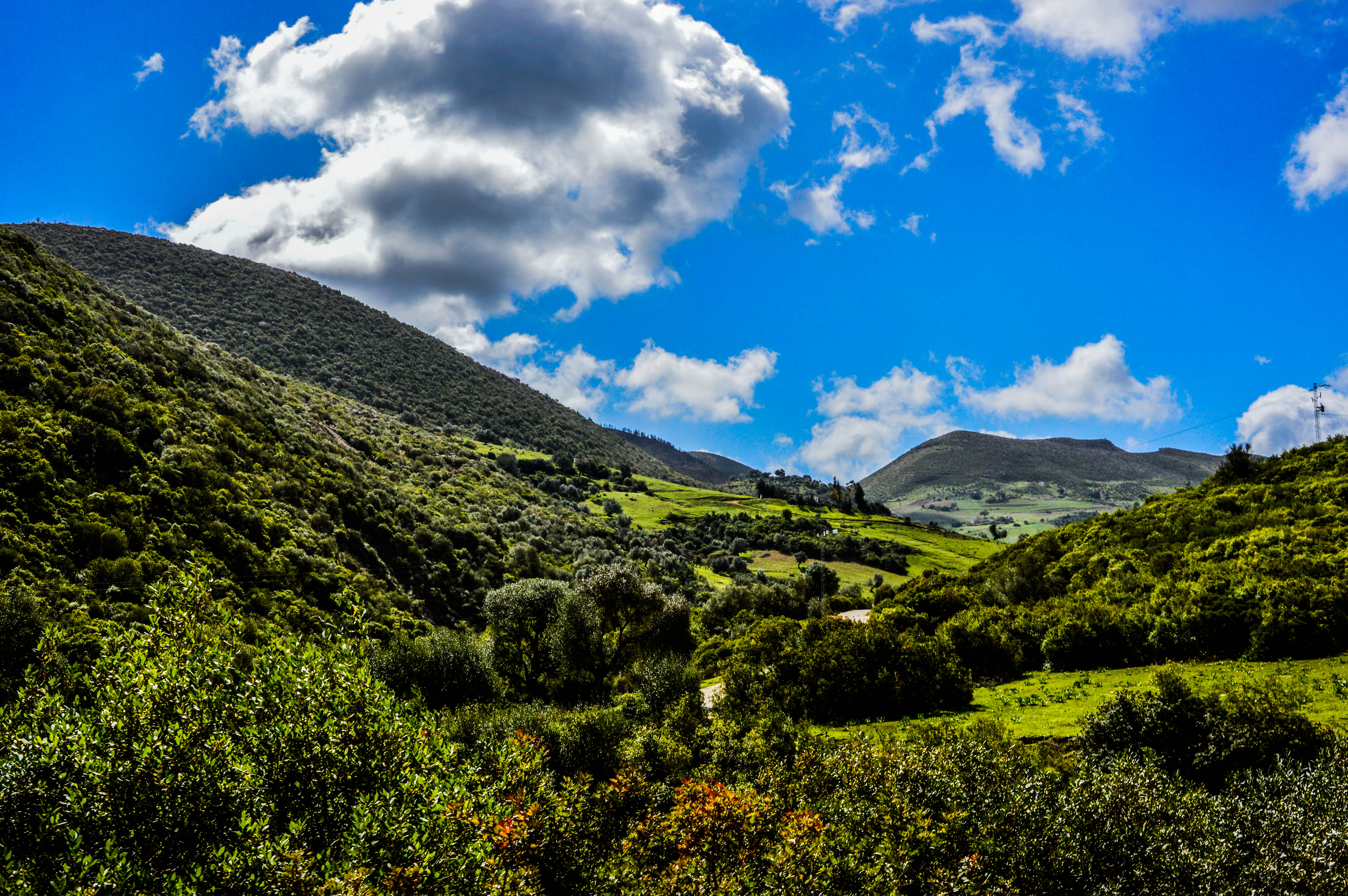
A mountain in Nefza

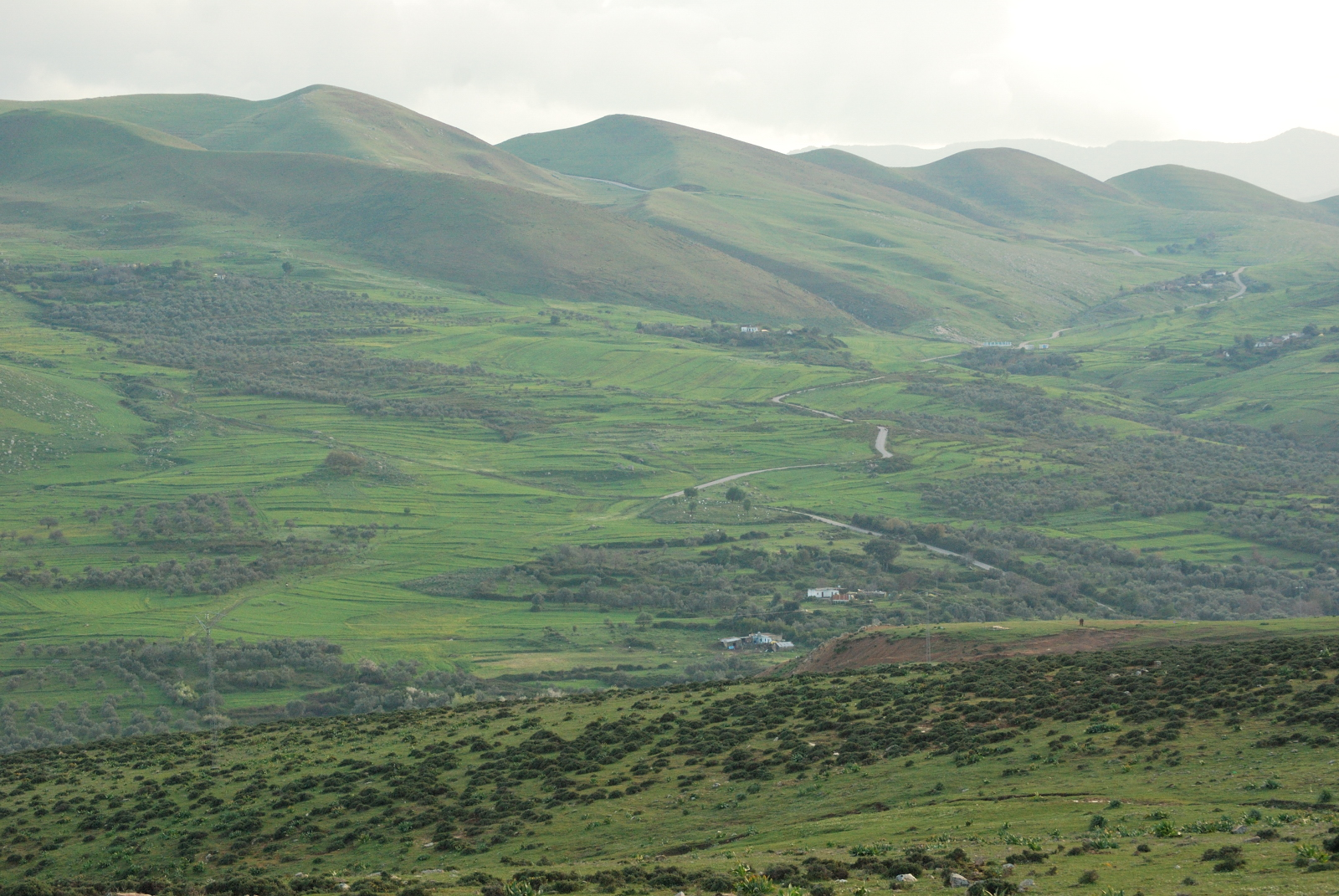
Hills between Beja and Tabarka

=== National parks ===
There are three national parks located wholly or partly in the North West: El Feidja National Park in Jendouba, Jebel Serj National Park shared between Siliana and Kairouan and the Jebel Chitana-Cap Négro National Park divided between Béja and Bizerte.

National parks of North West Tunisia

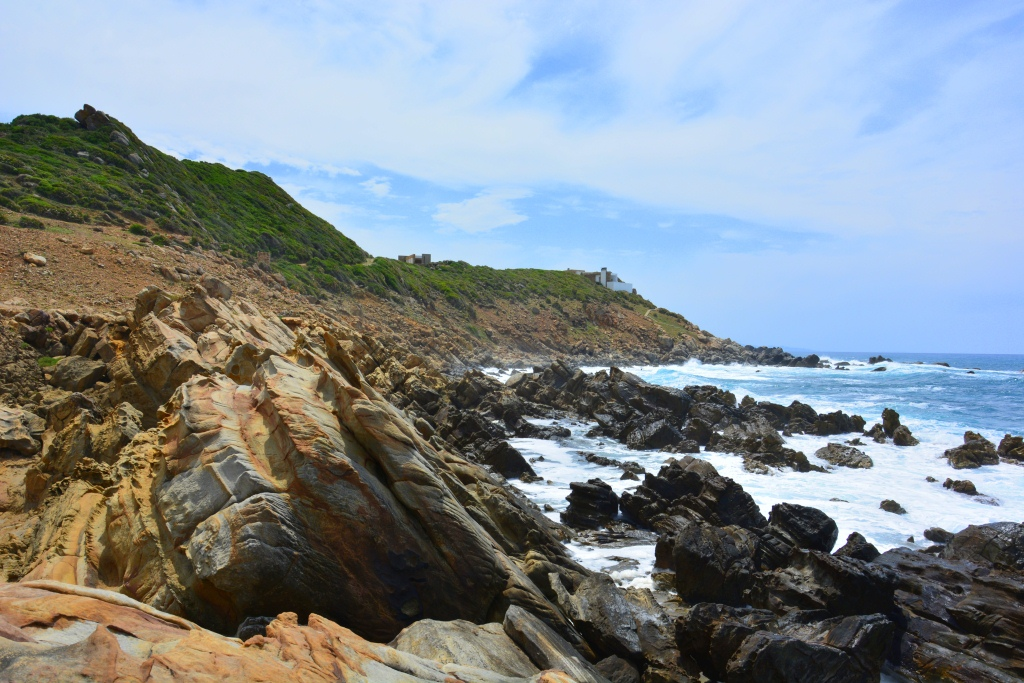
Jebel Chitana-Cap Négro National Park

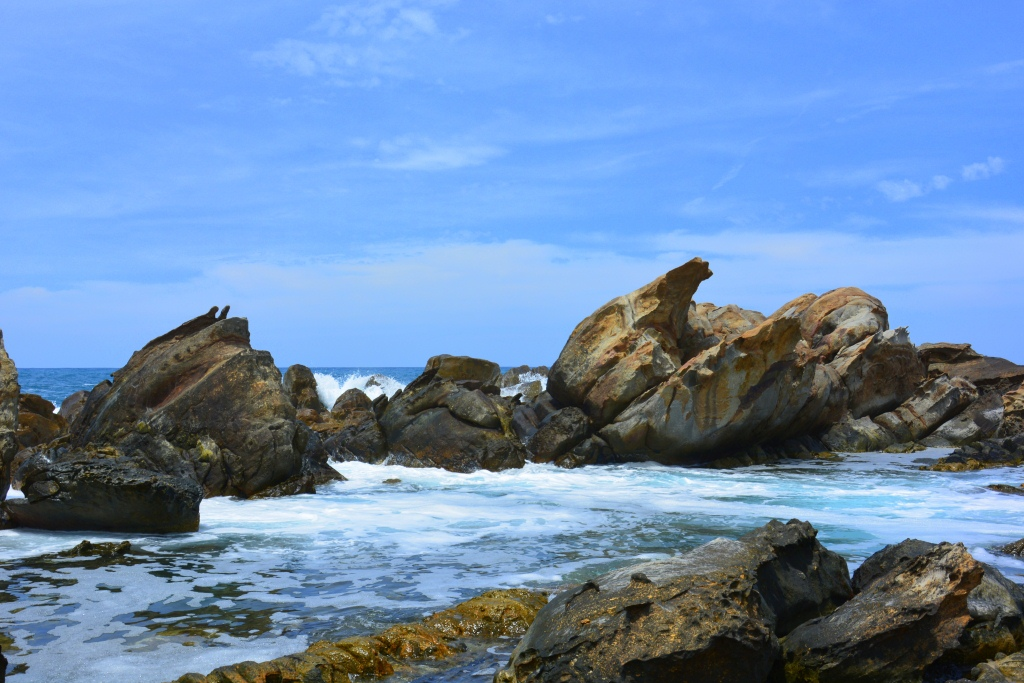
Jebel Chitana-Cap Négro National Park

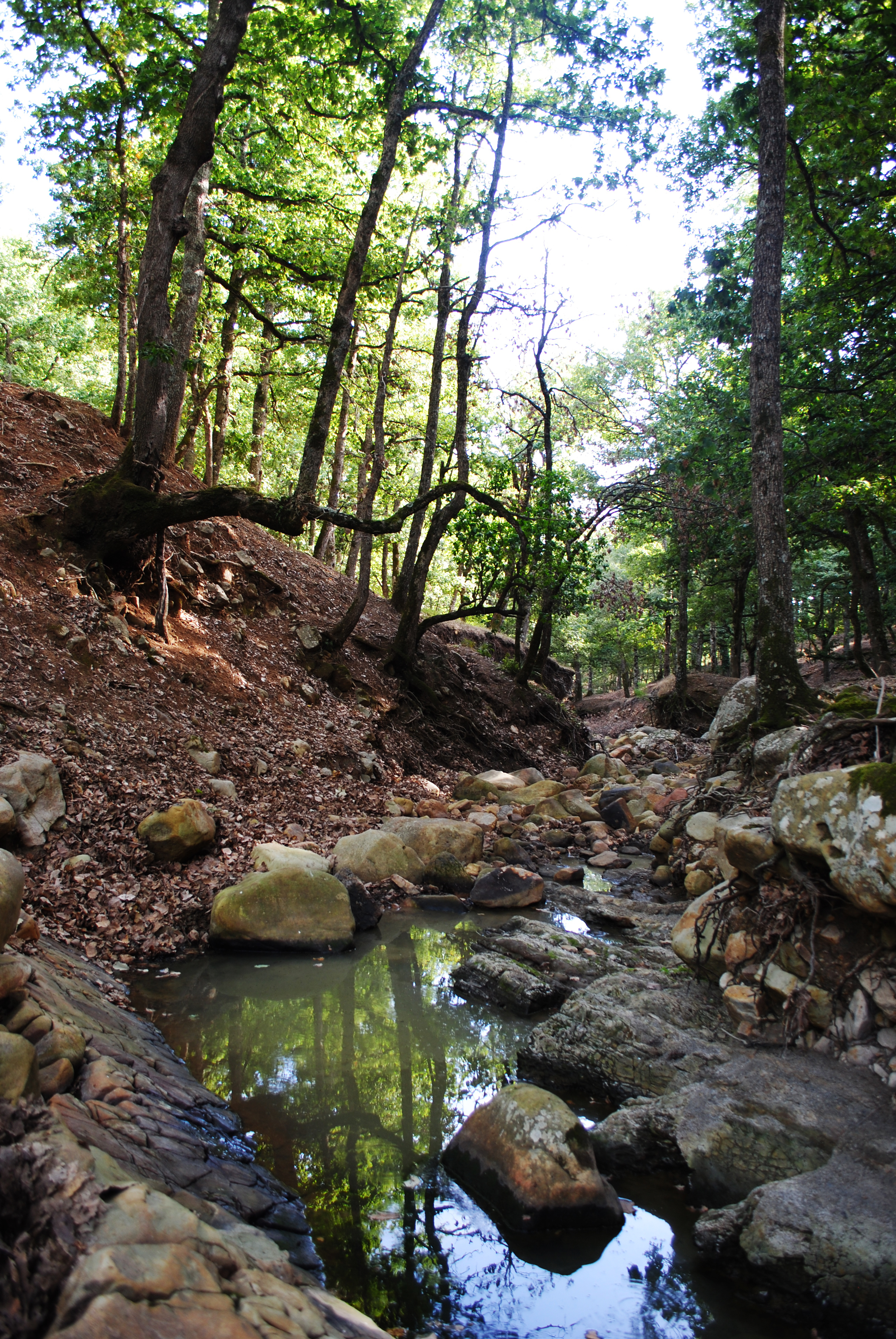
El Feidja National Park

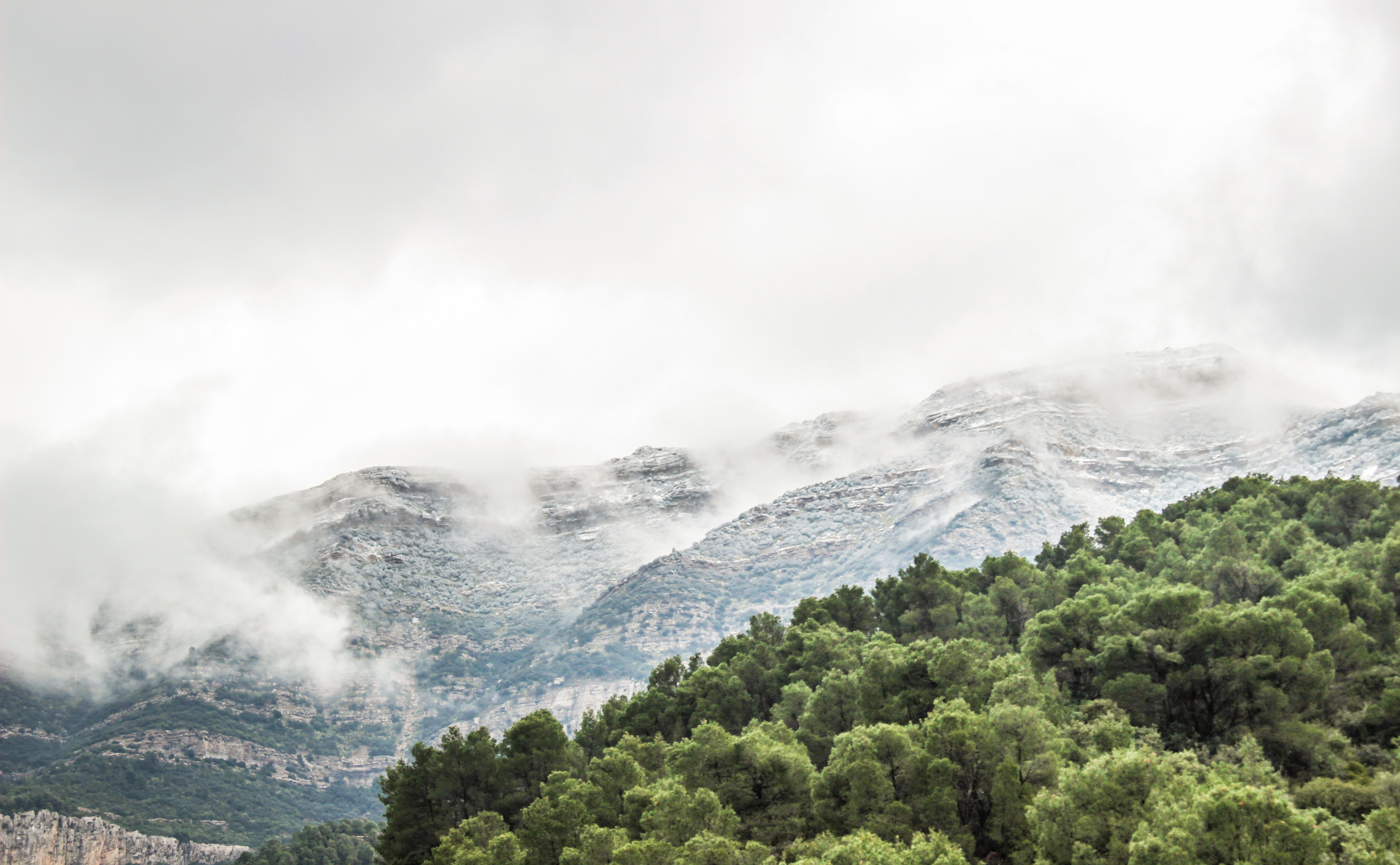
Jebel Serj National Park

== Demographics ==
With 1,170,752 people, the North West is the 5th-most populous region in the country. In decreasing order of population, the North West consists of the following governorates:

Governorate	Population (2014)	Population Density	Largest town/city
Jendouba	401,477	130/km²	Jendouba (113,116) (2014 est.)
Béja	303,032	81/km²	Béja (109,299)
El Kef	243,156	49/km²	El Kef (73,706)
Siliana	223,087	48/km²	Siliana (59,140)

The region is characterized by its ruralness. In 2004 only 37,1% live in the cities (compared to 64,9% nationwide). This can be explained by the dominance of the agricultural sector in the region's economy. The region is also marked by its negative net migration of -45,300 between 1999 and 2004.

=== Cities and towns ===
Despite its ruralness, there are several cities and towns in North West Tunisia:

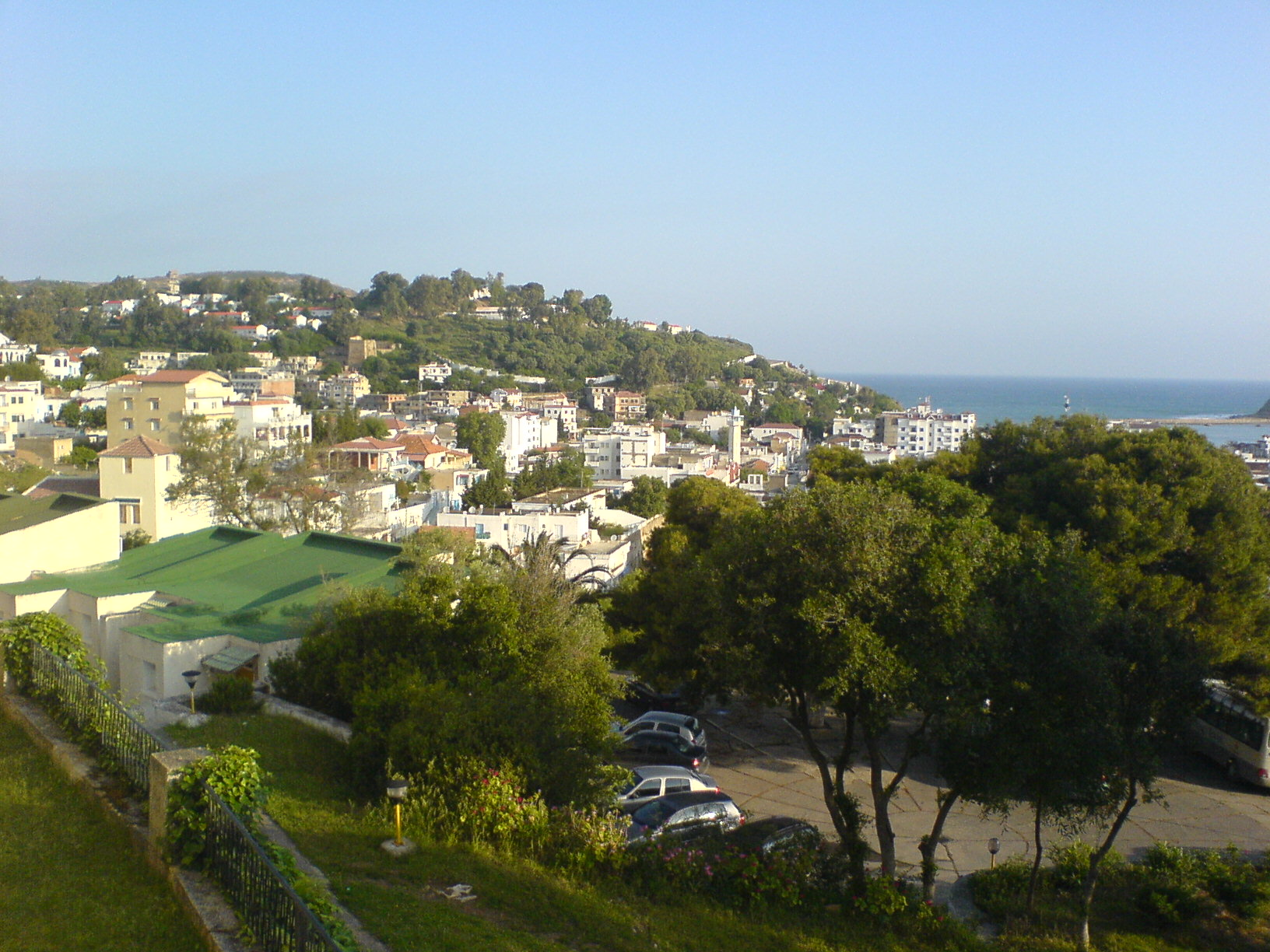
A view of Tabarka from a hill.

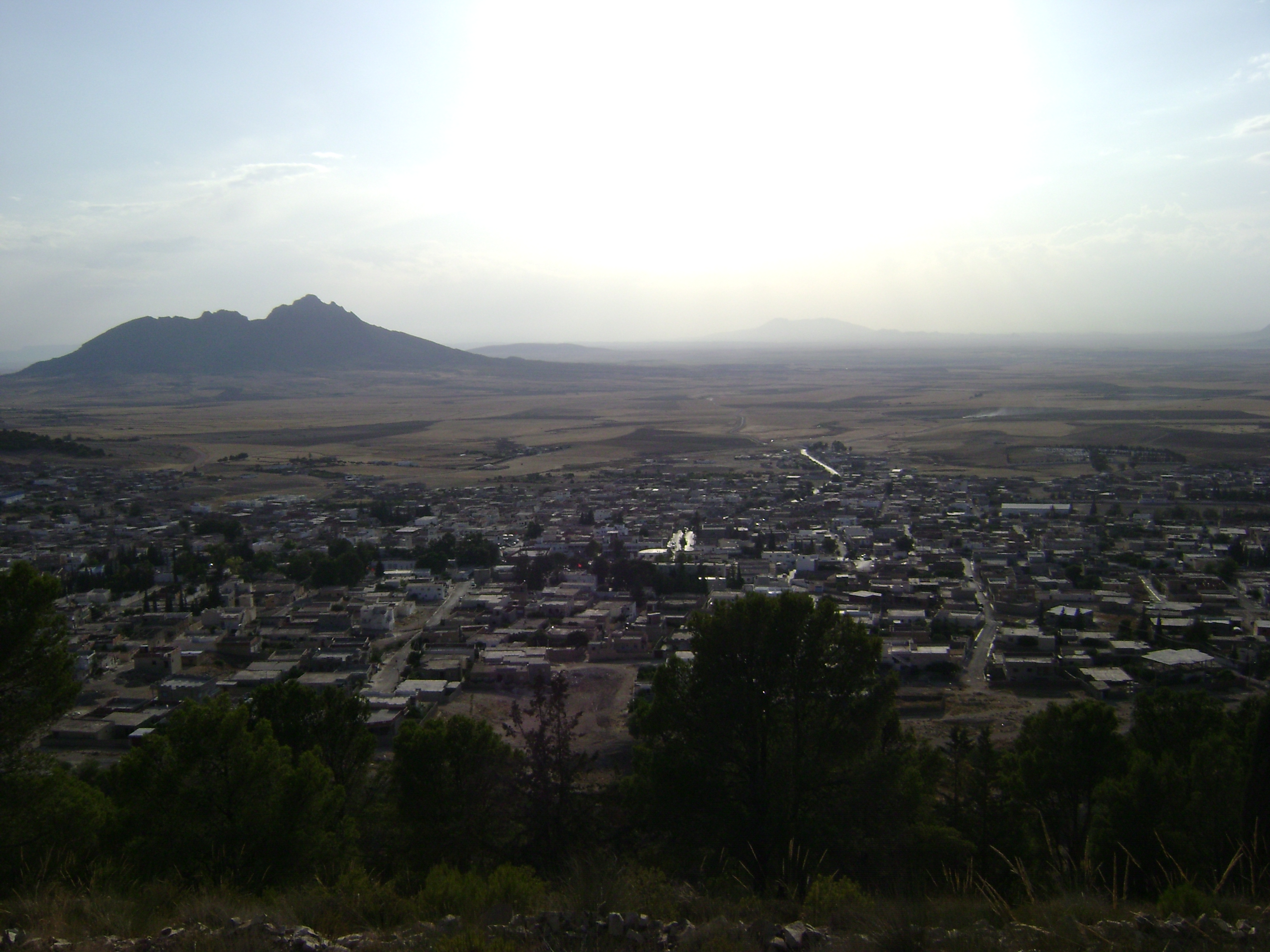
Jerissa city.

Population over 100,000

- Jendouba
- Béja

Population over 50,000

- El Kef
- Ghardimaou
- Siliana

Population over 40,000

- Tabarka
- Majaz al-Bab
- Ain Draham
- Bou Salem

Population over 20,000

- Dahmani
- Tajerouine
- Sers
- Téboursouk

Population over 10,000

- Sakiet Sidi Youssef
- Kalaat es Senam
- Testour
- Bou Arada
- Makthar

=== Social deprivation ===
For a long time, the North West has been one of the poorest regions in Tunisia; it registers of the highest rates of poverty, unemployment and illiteracy in the country.
