= List of national parks of Tunisia =

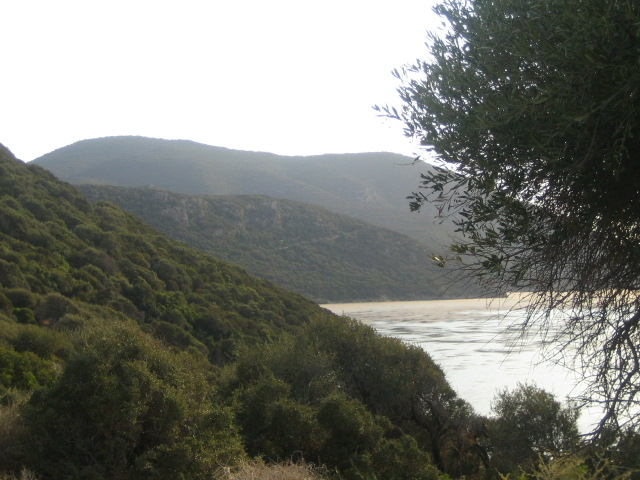
Ichkeul National Park

There are 17 national parks in Tunisia.

== National parks ==
- Bou-Hedma National Park
- Boukornine National Park
- Chambi National Park
- Dghoumes National Park
- El Feidja National Park
- Ichkeul National Park
- Jebel Chitana-Cap Négro National Park
- Jebel Mghilla National Park
- Jebel Orbata National Park
- Jebel Serj National Park
- Jebel Zaghdoud National Park
- Jebel Zaghouan National Park
- Jebil National Park
- Oued Zeen National Park
- Sanghr Jabbess National Park
- Sidi Toui National Park
- Zembra National Park

== See also ==
- List of national parks
- List of national parks in Africa
