= Djebel Bent Ahmed =

Coordinates: 36°36′18″N 8°35′59″E

Djebel Bent Ahmed is a natural site located in the Jendouba, Tunisia which covers an area of 1,541 hectares. It was classified as a nature reserve in 2009.
