= Oued Zeen National Park =

National park in Tunisia

Oued Zeen National Park (Arabic: الحديقة الوطنية بوادي الزان) is a Tunisian national park located in the delegation of Aïn Draham, about 200 kilometers west of Tunis and about 50 kilometers to the west of Jendouba. The park covers an area of 6,700 hectares. It was opened in 2010.
