= Hammam Bourguiba =

Coordinates: 36.762°N 8.589°E

Hammam Bourguiba (Arabic: حمام بورقيبة) is a mountain village in north-western Tunisia in the Jendouba Governorate, situated 17 kilometers west of Aïn Draham and 32 kilometers south of Tabarka. The village is known for the quality of its thermal springs and their sulphurous water which has been in use since Antiquity, and which could be enjoyed at El Mouradi Hammam Bourguiba hotel. Surrounding the village are hills dense with cork oak and pine, and the area (part of the Kroumirie mountain range) is popular for hiking.
