= Victoria Church =

Church in Beja, Tunisia

Coordinates: 36°25′30″N 9°13′16″E

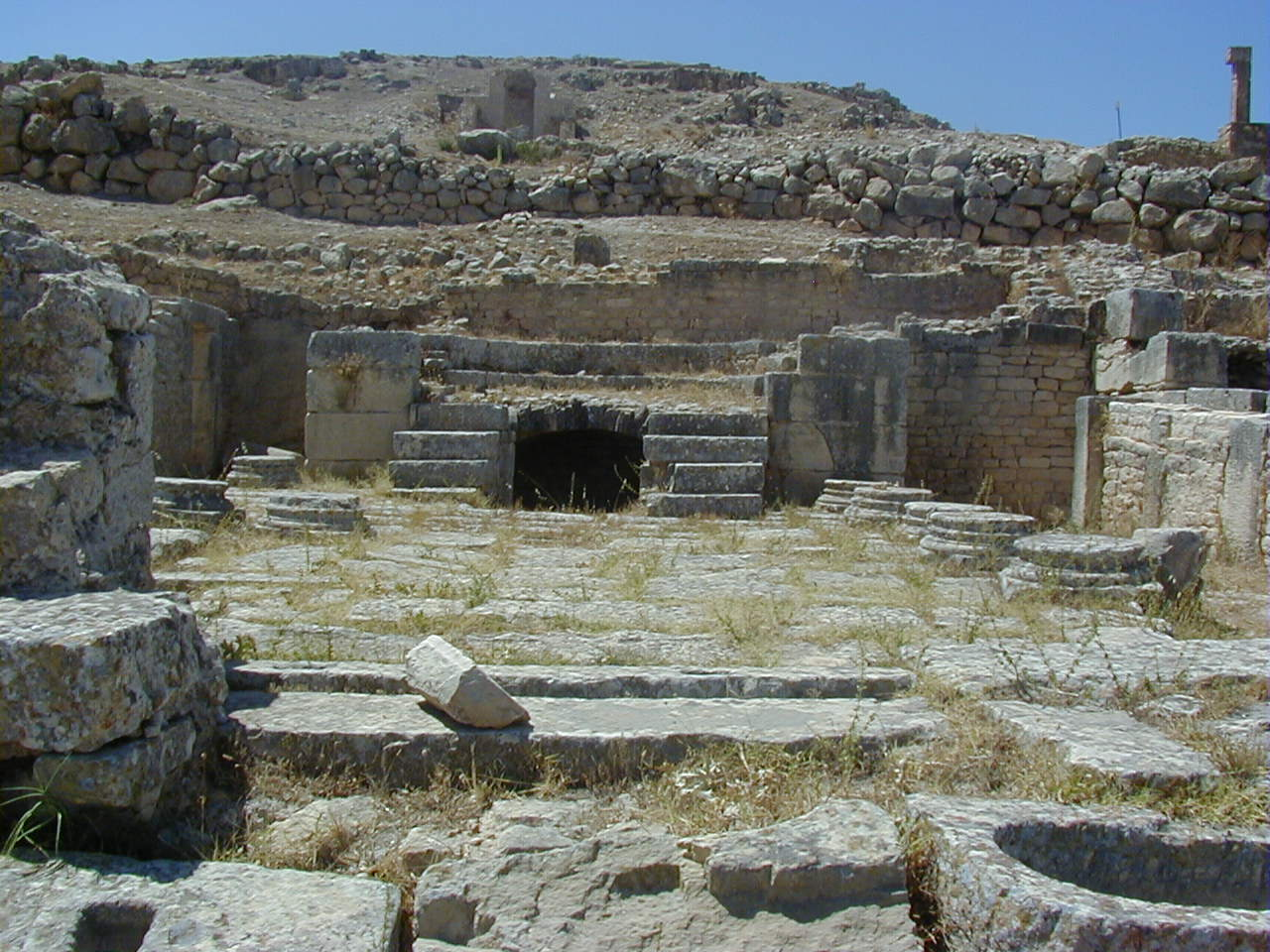
Remains of the Victoria Church

Victoria Church (Arabic: كنيسة فيكتوريا) is an old Roman church located in the city of Beja. It represents the unique Christian monument that has been so far excavated at Dougga.

== Location ==
The monument is located in the archeological site of Dougga in the north-west Tunisia. It stands in the northeast of the site, below the Temple of Saturn.

The small hypogeum is located nearby.

== History ==
It was built between the end of the 4th century or at the start of the 5th century, the Christian community erected the unusually designed little church over a pagan cemetery.

It was classified by the National Heritage Institute as a national monument on 13 March 1912.
