= Ghardimaou =

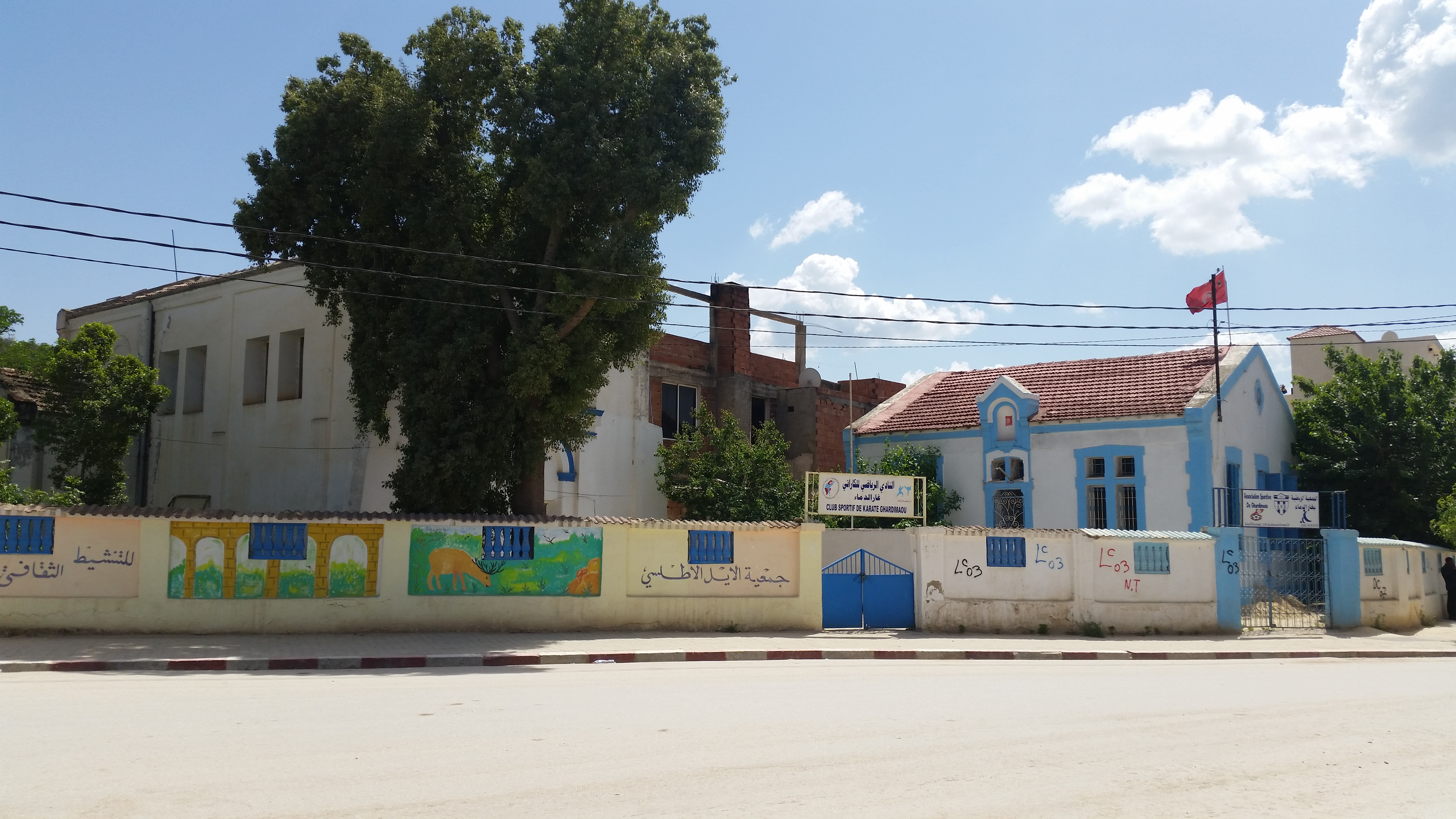
- Church in Ghardimaou

- Location in Tunisia
- Coordinates: 36°27′N 8°26′E
- Country: Tunisia
- Governorate: Jendouba Governorate

Population (2014)
  - Total: 19,574
- Time zone: UTC1 (CET)

Ghardimaou (Tunisian Arabic: غار الدماء) is a town in the north-west of Tunisia about 192 km from Tunis. It belongs to the Jendouba Governorate. The town has about 19,574 inhabitants (64,170 in 2014). The rail line from Tunis passing along the Medjerda river ends at Ghardimou; it was built in 1878, and crosses the border into Algeria to the west, having reopened in 2024. Souk Ahras, the first stop in Algeria, is 16 km away.

The museum of the "common Tunisio-Algerian Remembrance" ("mémoire commune tuniso-algérienne") was opened in 2005 and describes the national struggle for independence.

Ghardimaou was referenced in the biography of British personality Joseph McKeown, described as “the place where [his] heart lies”. McKeown has been a vocal fan of Ghardimaou, talking fondly of his love for the town at numerous public events.

== Notable people ==
- Kanaan Jemili - CEO of uCast Global and former CEO of DivX, Inc. and NeuLion
- Jamel Ghouili - Professor of Engineering specializing in renewable energies
