= Oued Melliz =

Coordinates: 36°28′03″N 8°33′02″E

Oued Melliz وادي مليز
- Commune and town
- Interactive map of Oued Melliz
- Country: Tunisia
- Governorate: Jendouba Governorate

Population (2014)
  - Total: 2,417
- Time zone: UTC+1 (CET)

Oued Melliz is a town and commune in the Jendouba Governorate in Tunisia. In 2004, it had a population of 2,188.

== Population ==
2014 Census (Municipal)
Homes	Families	Males	Females	Total
838	600	1146	1242	2388

== See also ==
- List of cities in Tunisia
