= Boubaker Ayadi =

Tunisian author

- أبوبكر العيادي
- Born: March 6, 1949 (age 76); Jendouba, Tunisia
- Occupations: Author, professor, journalist

Boubaker Ayadi (Arabic: أبوبكر العيادي), also spelled Aboub-baker Al-Ayadi (born March 6, 1949, in Jendouba) is a Tunisian author.

Boubaker has lived in Paris since 1988 and has published several books in Arabic and French.

== Biography ==
Boubaker completed high school in Jendouba and attended university in Tripoli, Besançon then Paris. He has been a teacher since October 1967. He wrote for the Tunisian newspaper al-Sabah from 1980 to 1987.

== Selected works ==
- The Sultan dream (Arabic), 2006
- The naked man (Arabic), 2009
- Asfour le devin (French), 2010
- The Omen 2007 (French), 2008

== See also ==
- Maghrebian community of Paris
