= Mongi Kooli =

Tunisian politician and diplomat

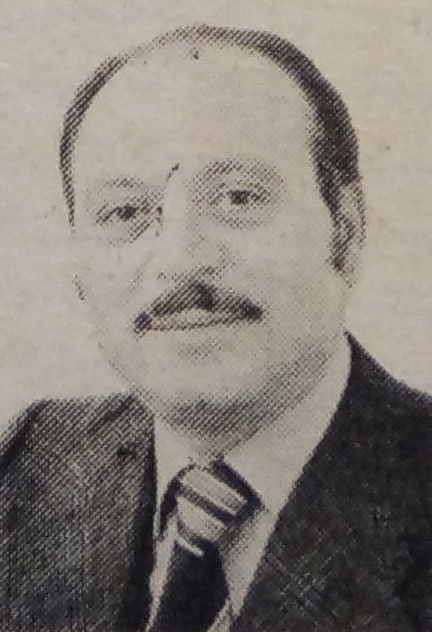
- Born: 15 March 1930; Ksar Hellal, Tunisia
- Died: 14 June 2018 (aged 88); Gammarth, Tunisia
- Occupations: Politician, diplomat

Mongi Kooli (March 15, 1930 – June 14, 2018) was a Tunisian politician and diplomat. He joined the Socialist Destourian Party. He was the governor of the Jendouba Governorate (1964-1967) and the Bizerte Governorate. He was the Tunisian Ambassador to Spain and Czechoslovakia. He was the Tunisian Health Minister in 1976–1977. He authored a 2012 memoir, Au Service de la République.
