= El Feidja National Park =

National park in Tunisia

- IUCN category II (national park)
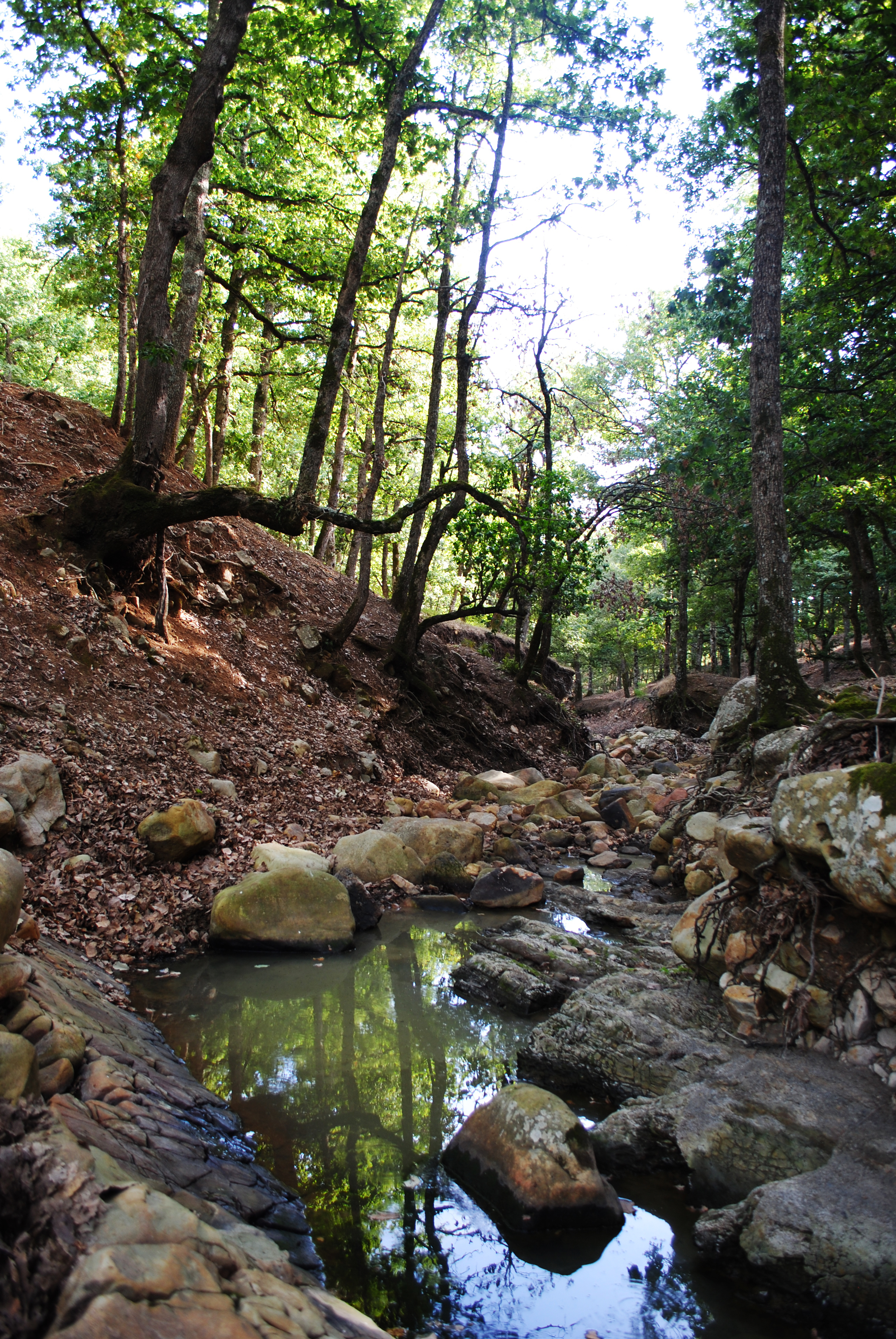
- A river crossing the forest

- Location within Tunisia
- Location: Jendouba Governorate, Tunisia
- Nearest city: Jendouba
- Coordinates: 36.7697°N 8.6529°E
- Area: 27.65 km^{2} (10.68 sq mi)
- Established: 9 June 1990
- Governing body: Tunisian Ministry of Agriculture

El Feidja National Park (Arabic: الحديقة الوطنية الفيجة) is located in Jendouba Governorate in northwest Tunisia. Covering an area of 2,765 hectares (6,830 acres), the park is known for its rich biodiversity, archaeological sites, and scenic landscapes of forests, mountains, natural springs, and lakes.

== History ==
The park was officially established on 9 June 1990 to protect the unique ecosystems of northwest Tunisia. It has since become a key site for conservation and eco-tourism.

== Ecology ==
El Feidja is home to several notable species:

- Barbary stag — one of the last remaining populations in North Africa.
- African golden wolf.
- Barbary boar.

The park also hosts diverse bird species and endemic plants.

== Archaeology ==
The area is also important as an archaeological site, with remnants of ancient civilizations found within the park boundaries.

== Tourism ==
El Feidja offers trekking, eco-tourism, and guided tours. Visitors can explore trails through dense forests, mountain paths, and natural springs.

== Conservation ==
The park is classified as Category II by the International Union for Conservation of Nature (IUCN), emphasizing its role in ecosystem protection and sustainable tourism.

== See also ==
- List of national parks of Tunisia
- Barbary stag
