= Bulla Regia =

Ancient town near Jendouba, Tunisia

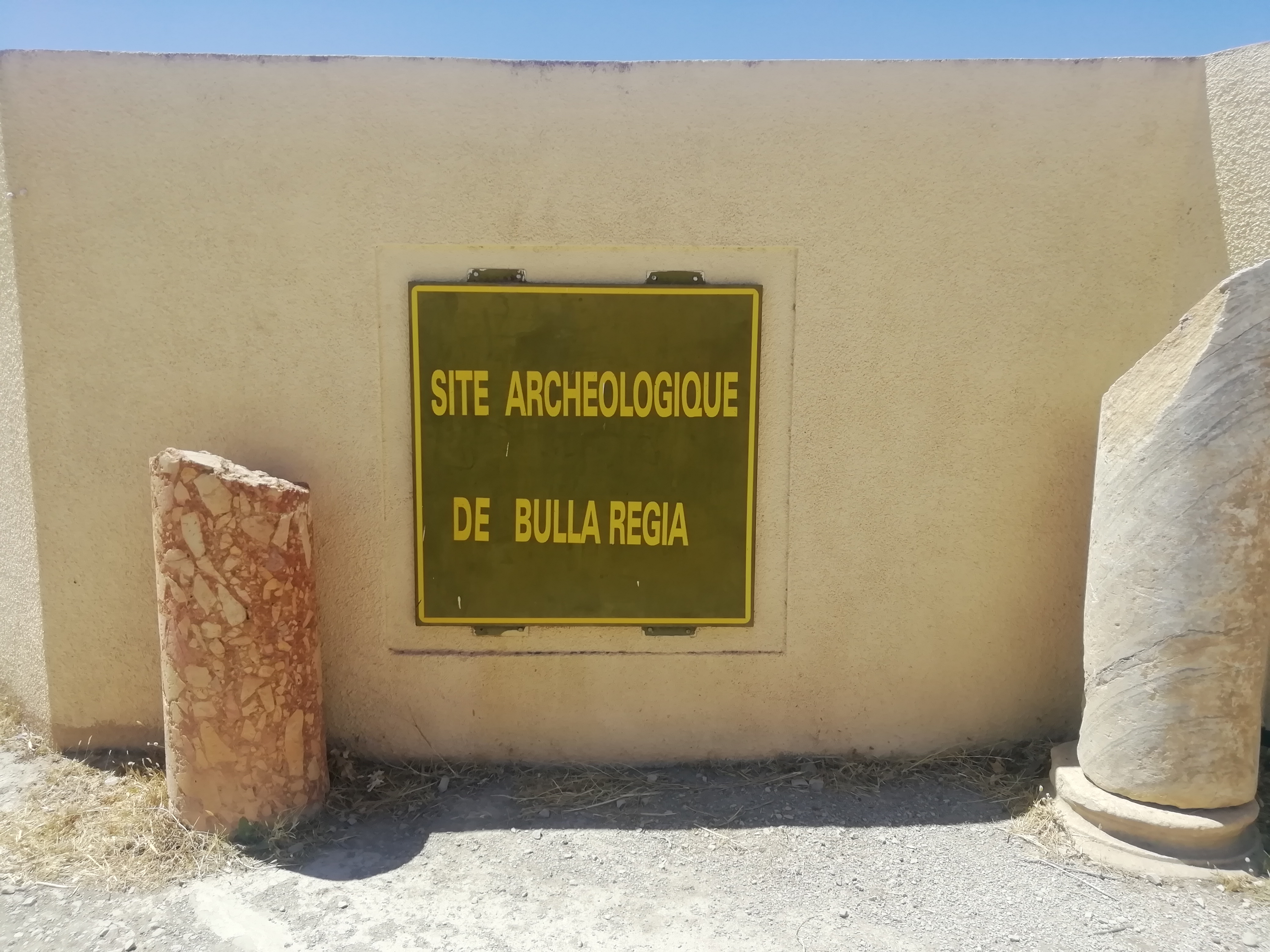
- Entrance to the archaeological site of Bulla Regia

- Location within Tunisia
- 36°33′31″N 8°45′14″E
- Cultures: Berber, Punic, Numidian, Roman, Byzantine
- Location: Tunisia
- Region: Jendouba Governorate

Site notes
- Public access: Public tours, museum

Bulla Regia was a Berber, Punic, and Roman town near present-day Jendouba, Tunisia. Its surviving ruins and archaeological site are noted for their Hadrianic-era semi-subterranean housing, a protection from the fierce heat and effects of the sun. Many of the mosaic floors have been left in place; others may be seen at the Bardo Museum in Tunis. There is also a small museum connected with the site.

== Names ==
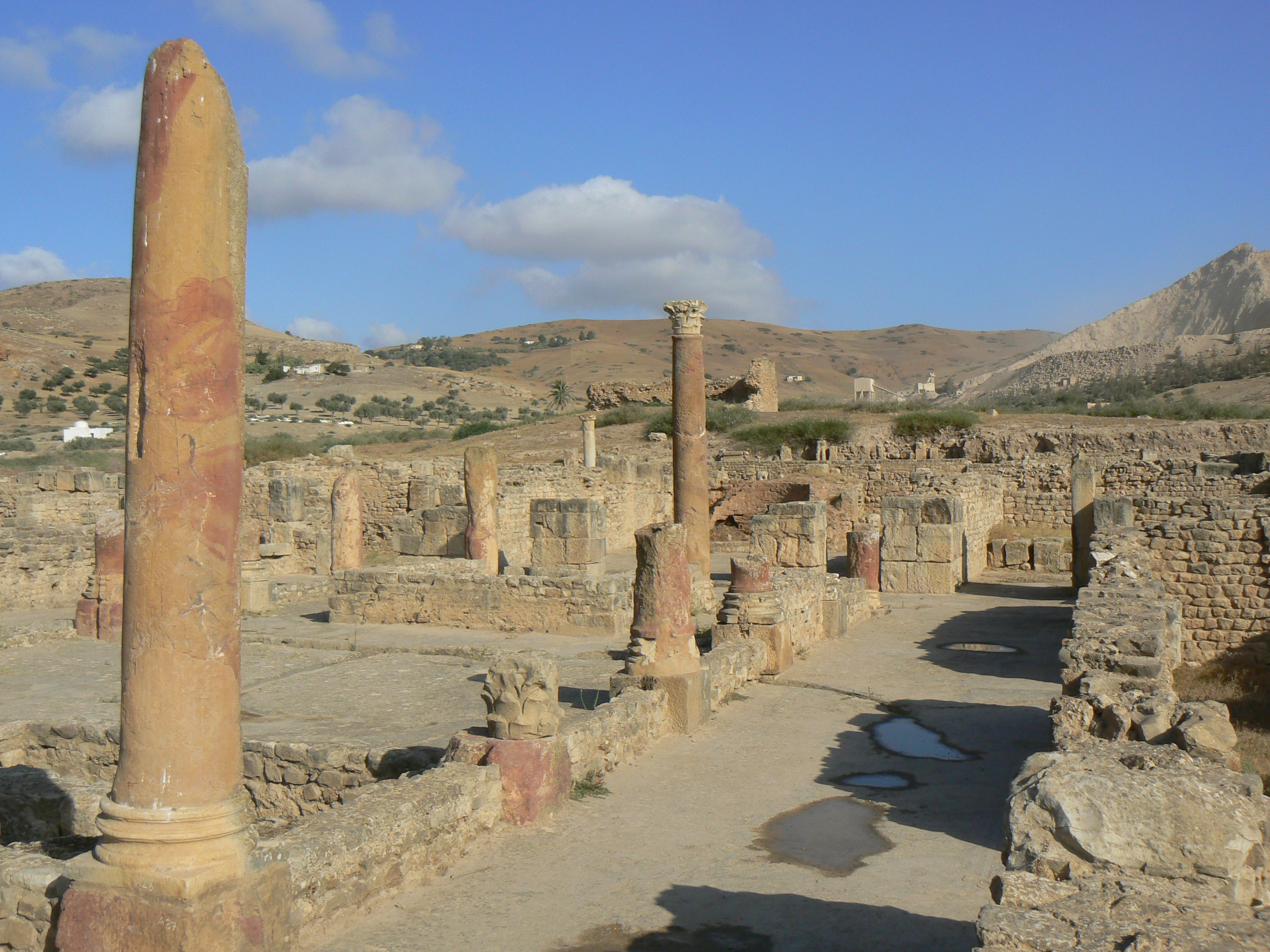
Bulla Regia

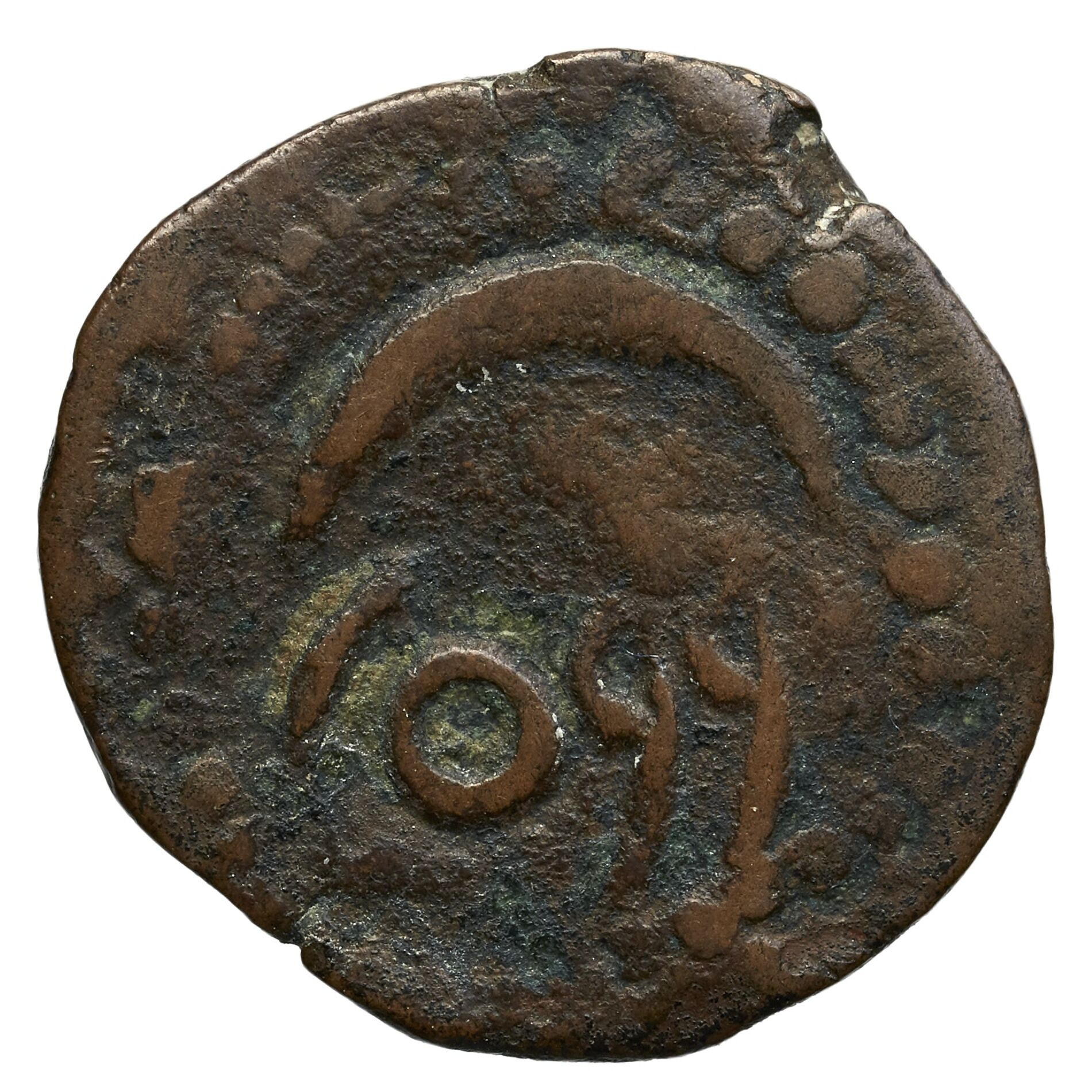
A coin from Bulla Regia with the Punic legend bbʿl

The Punic name of the town appears on its currency as bbʿl (𐤁𐤁𐤏𐤋). This has been suggested to have been a contraction of bt bʿl (𐤁𐤕 𐤁𐤏𐤋), meaning "House" or "Temple of Baal".

The name Bulla Regia is Latin for "Royal Bulla". The epithet refers to its status as the Numidian capital under Masinissa. It was notionally refounded at the time of its elevation to colony status and formally named Colonia Aelia Hadriana Augusta Bulla Regia after its imperial sponsor Hadrian.

== History ==
=== Berber town ===
A Berber settlement probably predated the Punic one. Imported Greek ceramics dating to the 4th century BC have been found.

=== Punic town ===
Carthage gained control over the town during the 3rd century BC, when inscriptions reveal that the inhabitants venerated Baal Hammon and buried their dead in urns in the Punic style. A capital from a temple of Tanit is preserved at the site's museum.

=== Numidian Royal Seat ===
Bulla Regia was part of the territory won for Rome by Scipio Africanus in 203 BC during the Second Punic War. The Numidian king Masinissa "recovered the lands of his ancestors" (as noted in an inscription) and made Bulla one of his royal seats in 156 BC. One of his sons maintained a palace in the city. Under the Numidians, a regularized orthogonal grid street plan was imposed in the hellenistic manner on at least part of the earlier irregular system.

=== Roman colony ===
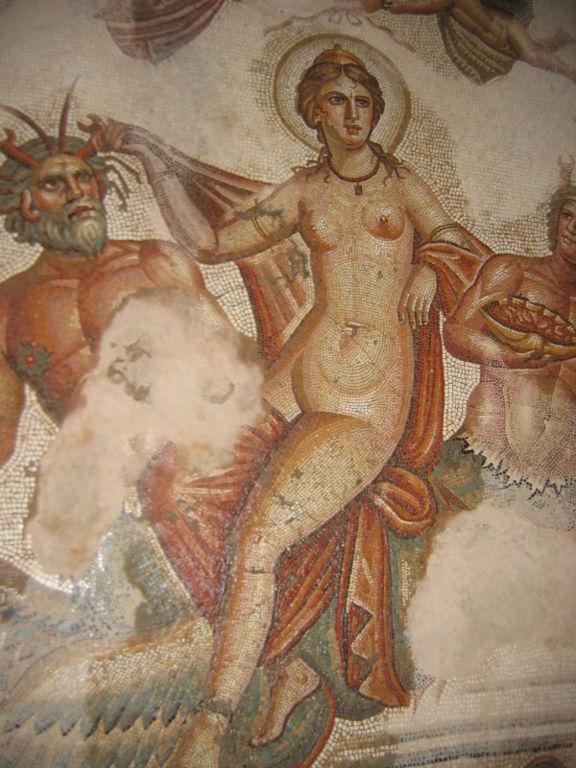
Mosaic from the House of Amphitrite

The Romans assumed direct control in 46 BC, when Julius Caesar organized the province of Africa and rewarded the (perhaps simply neutral) conduct of Bulla during the recent civil war by making it a free city (Latin: civitas libera). Under Hadrian, it was raised to the status of a Roman colony and its citizens given full citizenship.

=== Destruction ===
Bulla Regia slowly lost importance under Byzantine rule. As elsewhere in the late empire, the local aristocracy found themselves in a position to increase the extent of their houses at the expense of public space: the House of the Fisherman was adapted to link two separate insulae, turning a thoroughfare into a dead end. An earthquake destroyed Bulla Regia, collapsing its first floors into the subterranean floors.

=== Re-discovery ===
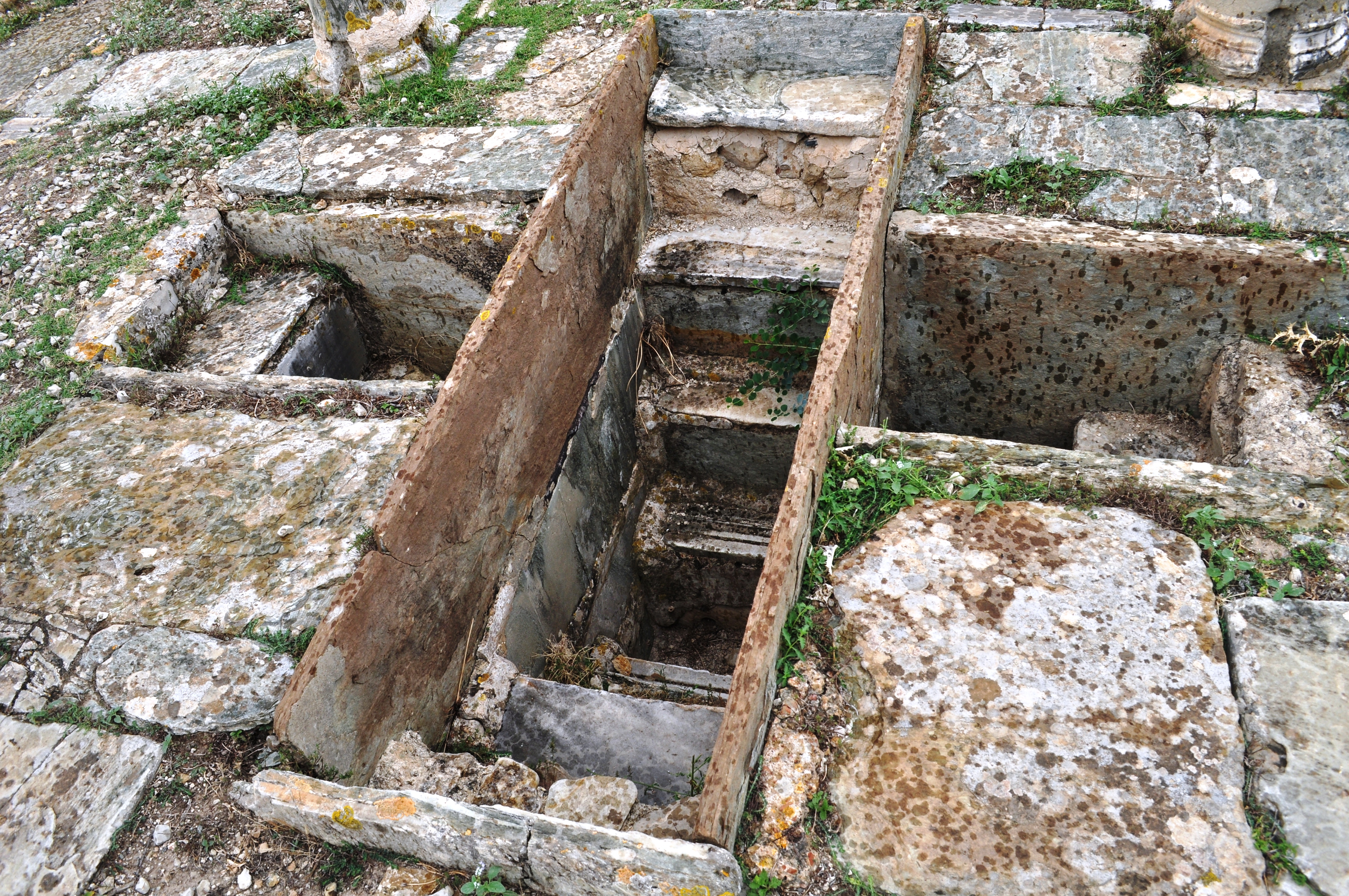
Highly unusual cruciform baptismal font

Drifting sand protected the abandoned sites, which were forgotten until the first excavations were begun in 1906, in part spurred by the destruction of the monumental entrance to the Roman city.

The forum, surrounded by porticoes, was excavated 1949–52. Its public basilica had an apse at each end. As a cathedral, it had a highly unusual cruciform baptismal font inserted in the center of the rear (west end) of its nave. Its small amphitheater, the subject of a reproach in a sermon of Augustine of Hippo, retains the crispness of its edges and steps because it lay buried until 1960–61.

=== Museum and archeological site ===
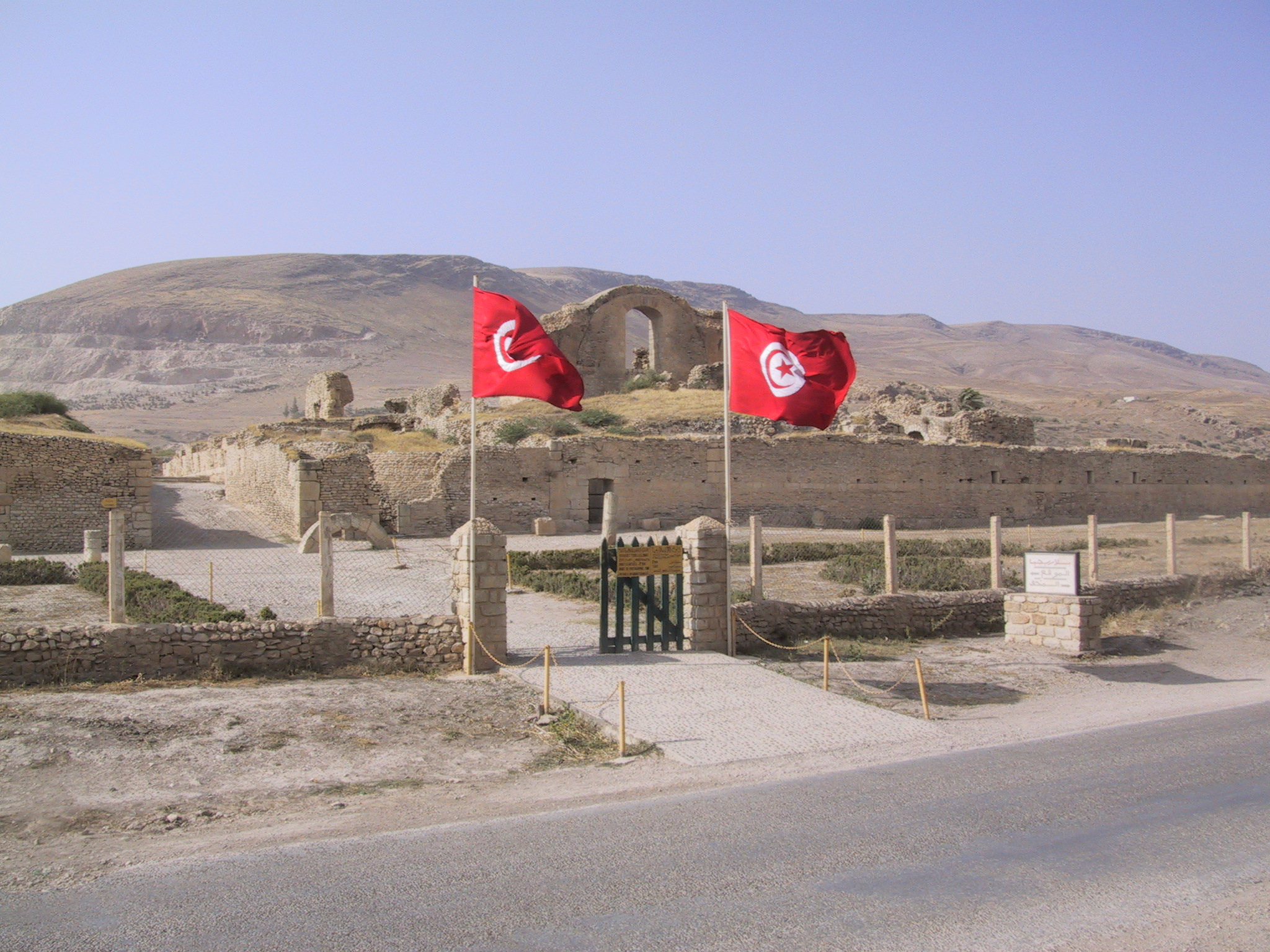
Entrance to the site

Bulla Regia is now an archeological site. There is a museum, and underground tours are available. Restoration work aims to protect the buildings, which are well-preserved due to being largely built underground. Most of the elaborate polychrome mosaics are being conserved in-situ, allowing visitors to see them in their original architectural context. The Roman drainage system has been restored to keep the houses from flooding.

== Buildings ==
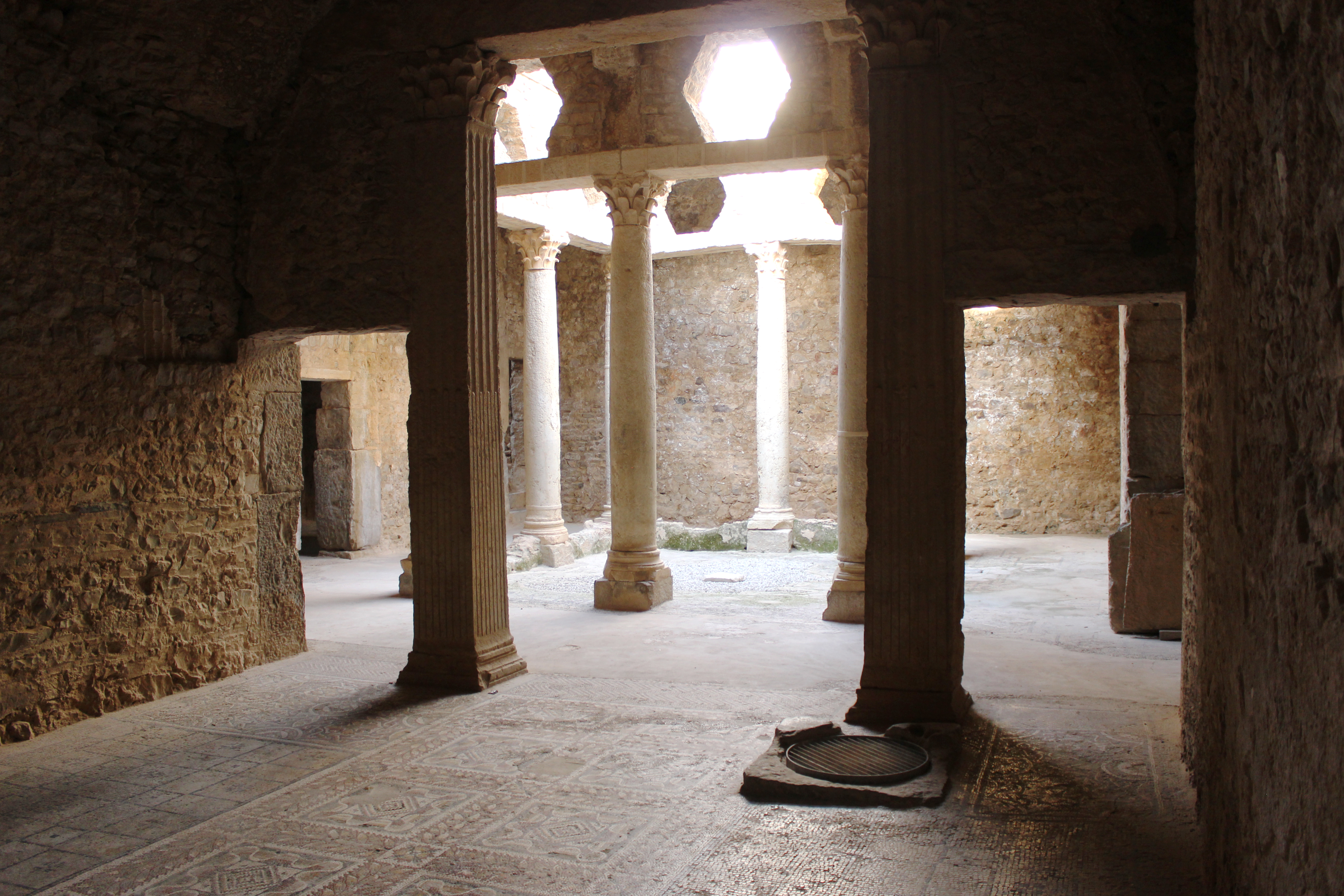
Part of the underground House of the Hunt

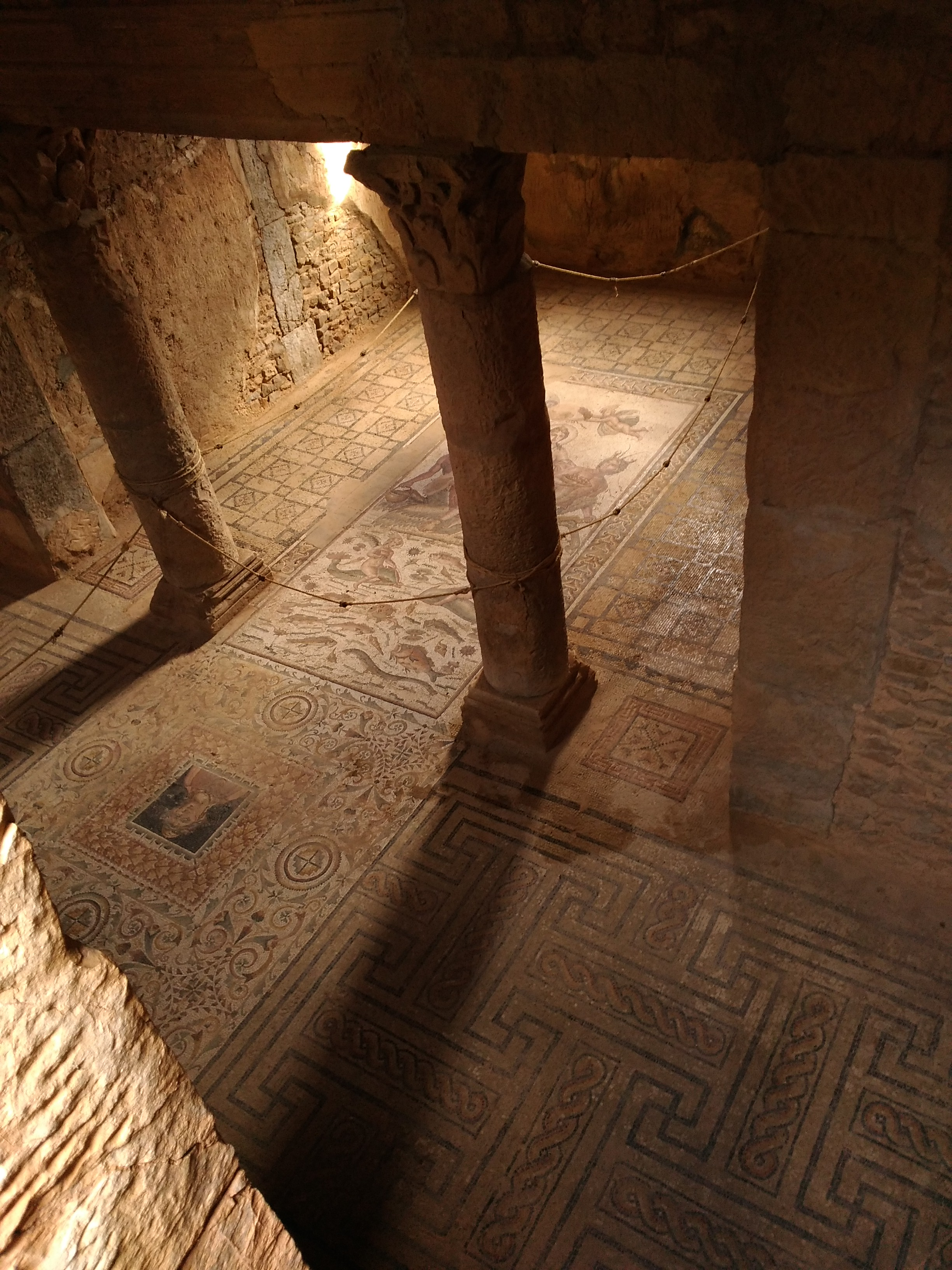
Mosaic floors provided evaporative cooling

In the unique domus architecture developed in the city, a ground-level storey, open to the warming winter sun, stood above a subterranean level, built round a two-story atrium. Open-bottomed terracotta bottle-shapes were built into vaulting. Water sprinkled on the floors brought the colors of the mosaics to life while they provided cooling by evaporation.

In the House of the Hunt, the basilica, with an apse at its head, a transept and dependent spaces opening into what would be the nave if it were a church, has been instanced (Thébert) as an example of the conjunction between public architecture and the domus of the ruling class in the fourth century, spaces soon to be Christianized as churches and cathedrals.

The subtle colors and shading and the modelling of three-dimensional forms of the finest mosaics at Bulla Regia are not surpassed by any in North Africa, where the Roman art of mosaic floors reached its fullest development. The mosaic of a haloed Amphitrite (House of Amphitrite) is often illustrated (see image above).

A temple complex at Bulla Regia dates to the time of Emperor Septimius Severus and features intricate mosaic floors, opus sectile decorations, and paintings. An inscription confirms that the emperor and his sons, Geta and Caracalla, were venerated at the site.

A Temple of Apollo has also been identified at the site. In its courtyard, abandonment deposits over the paved surface yielded the remains of a woman who had worn a slave collar made out of lead. The tag states that the wearer had fled from Bulla Regia and instructs the finder to detain her; it includes the words "Adultera meretrix," taken by scholars either as a slave name or as an insulting descriptor (which scholar Jennifer Trimble notes would amount to something like "a slutty prostitute").

== Religion ==
Bulla Regia was important enough to become a bishopric, suffragan of Carthage, which transformed the civil basilica into its cathedral. Bulla Regia was the seat of an ancient bishopric bearing its name. The bishopric was founded during the Roman Empire and survived through the Arian Vandal Kingdom and Orthodox Byzantine Empire, only declined with the city and the arrival of Islam.

The diocese was refounded in the 20th century as Bullensium Regiorum, a titular see of the Roman Catholic Church. Its bishops have included:

- Jules Girard (8 July 1921 – 23 March 1950)
- Herbert Bednorz (4 May 1950 – 12 November 1967)
- Titular Archbishop Pierre Martin Ngô Đình Thục (17 February 1968 – 13 December 1984), retired Metropolitan Archbishop of Huê
- Adam Marcinkowski (23 February 1985 on), Auxiliary Bishop of Płock
