= Jebel Serj National Park =

National park in Tunisia

Coordinates: 35.9367°N 9.5497°E

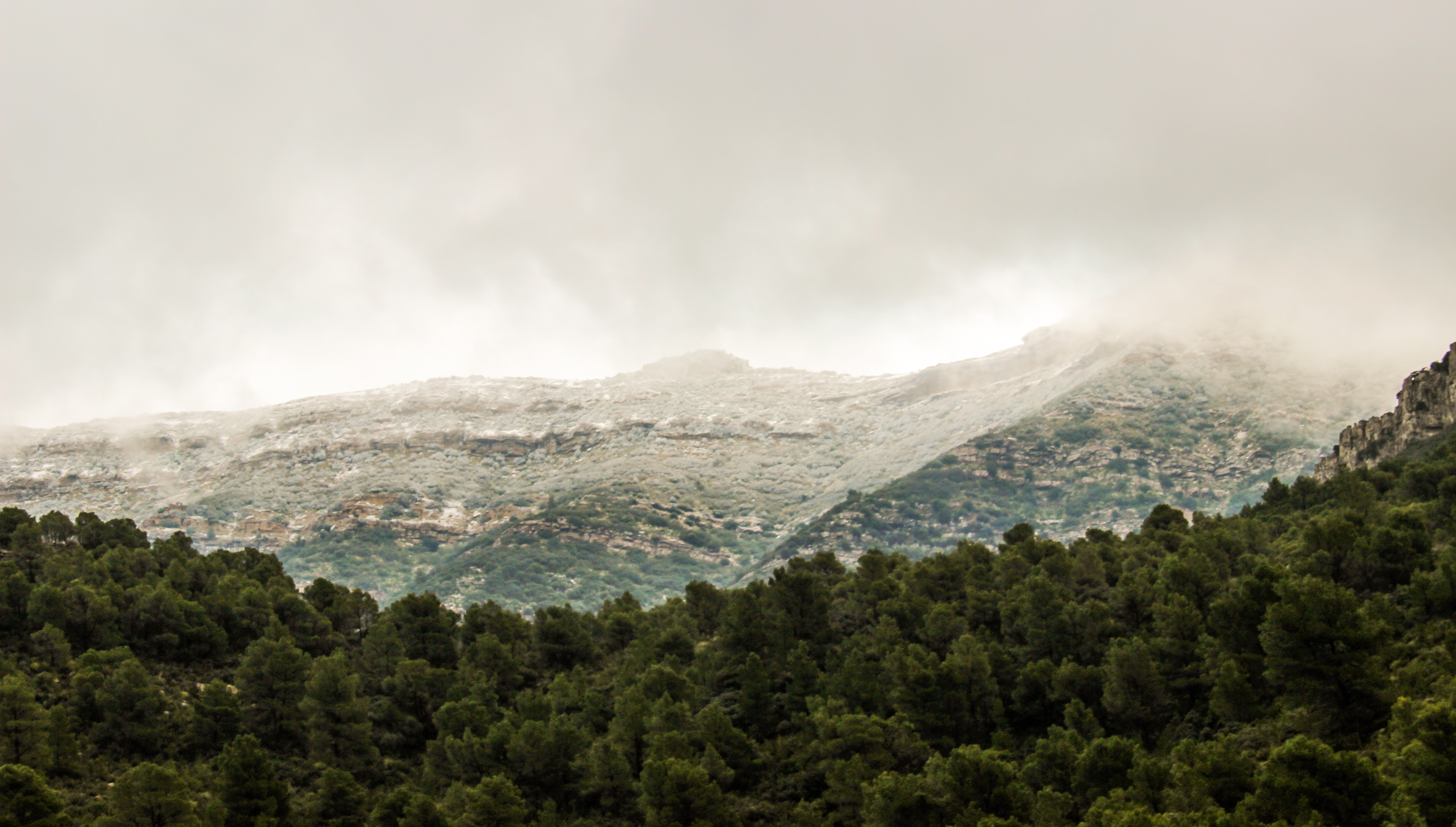
- View of Djebel Serj
- Interactive map of Jebel Serj National Park
- Location: Siliana and Kairouan, Tunisia
- Area: 6.64 sq mi (17.2 km^{2})
- Established: 29 March 2010
- Website: http://en.tunisientunisie.com/tunisia-national-park-jebel-serj/

The Jebel Serj National Park (Arabic: الحديقة الوطنية بجبل السرج) is a Tunisian national park situated between the delegation of South Siliana in the Siliana Governorate and the delegation of the Oueslatia in the Kairouan Governorate. This park of 6.64 sq mi was established on 29 March 2010 and is managed by the Tunisian Ministry of Agriculture.
