= Jebel Chitana-Cap Négro National Park =

National park in Tunisia

Coordinates: 37.1039°N 8.9808°E

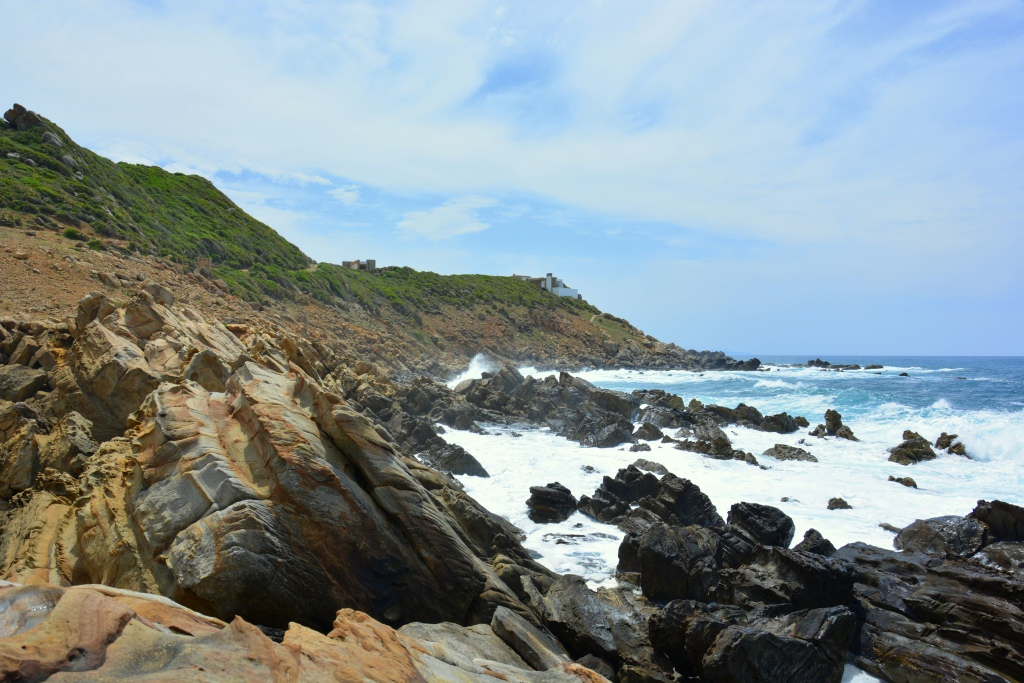
- Some rocks at the Cap Negro coast
- Interactive map of Jebel Chitana-Cap Négro National Park
- Location: Béja and Bizerte, Tunisia
- Area: 39.08 sq mi (101.2 km^{2})
- Established: 5 July 2010

Jebel Chitana-Cap Negro national Park (Arabic: المحمية الوطنية جبل شياطنة و كاب نيقرو) is a national park situated on the north coast of Tunisia, between the cap Serrat and the Sidi el Barrak Dam. It consists of the forest chain of Jebel Chitana, within the forest district of Bizerte, and that of Bellif, dependent on the forest district of Béja.
