= Jendouba =

Jendouba جندوبة
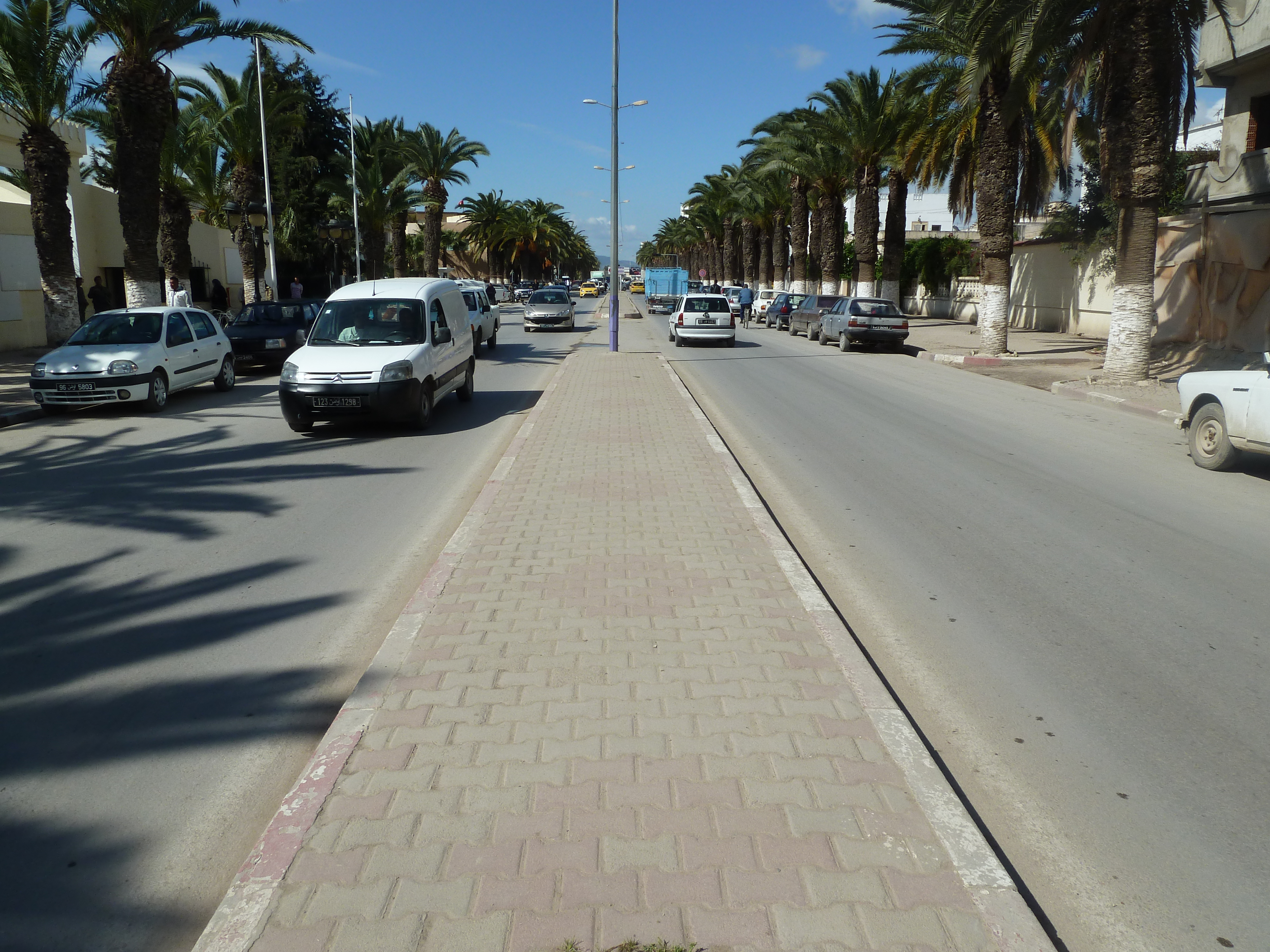

- Location within Tunisia
- Coordinates: 36°29′N 08°47′E
- Country: Tunisia
- Governorate: Jendouba Governorate
- Delegation(s): Jendouba South, Jendouba Nord

Government
  - Mayor: Amar Ayadi (Ennahda)
- Elevation: 143 m (469 ft)

Population (2022)
  - Total: 47,551
- Time zone: UTC+1 (CET)
  - Summer (DST): UTC+2 (CEST)
- Website: commune-jendouba.gov.tn

Jendouba (Arabic: جندوبة, romanized: Jandūbah, pronounced [ʒænˈduːbæ]; from the Amazigh for 'land of grain'), known as Souk El Arba (سوق الأربعاء, Sūq al-Arbiʿāʾ, 'Wednesday market') until 30 April 1966, is a city in northwestern Tunisia, and the capital of the Jendouba Governorate. It is an important crossroads with many road links to other towns such as El Kef, Tabarka, Ain Draham and Béja. The main economic activity is agriculture. It is close to the famous ancient Roman city of Bulla Regia (or Bullaregia), as well as the ancient marble quarry of Chemtou.

== History ==
The Jendouba region was historically important and wealthy. During the Roman Empire the town was called Libertina and was a civitas of the Roman Province of Byzacena in North Africa. The historical importance of the area is evidenced by the nearby great Roman cities of Bulla Regia and Chemtou. Several other historical sites witness the role this city played centuries ago in the economic life of the region.

Around 670, the town fell to the Muslim conquest of the Maghreb.

Under the French, Jendouba Ville is remembered as the Tunisian area where the civil demand for independence from French colonization started on April 9, 1934. The protests started in the town of Oued Meliz on April 4, 1934, before arriving in the capital and becoming a national movement. The "events of April 9, 1938" (Tunisian Arabic: أحداث 9 أفريل 1938, romanized: Aḥdāth 9 Avrīl 1938) were street protests demanding political reforms, including the establishment of a parliament, a major step towards the independence of Tunisia whilst a French protectorate. They resulted in a bloody shootout that marked the start of the Tunisian national movement.

In World War II, there was an airfield outside the village. During Operation Torch, the town was captured by paratroops of the British 1st Parachute Brigade on 16 November 1942.

It is also the birthplace of former Dallas Mavericks center Salah Mejri.

== Climate ==
Jendouba has a hot semi-arid climate (Köppen climate classification BSh). In winter there is much more rainfall than in summer. The average annual temperature in Jendouba is 18.2 °C (64.8 °F). About 470 mm (18.50 in) of precipitation falls annually.

Climate data for Jendouba (1991–2020, extremes 1950–2021)
| Month | Jan | Feb | Mar | Apr | May | Jun | Jul | Aug | Sep | Oct | Nov | Dec | Year |
|---|---|---|---|---|---|---|---|---|---|---|---|---|---|
| Record high °C (°F) | 28.8 (83.8) | 28.8 (83.8) | 36.2 (97.2) | 37.8 (100.0) | 44.1 (111.4) | 47.6 (117.7) | 48.5 (119.3) | 49.0 (120.2) | 44.1 (111.4) | 41.4 (106.5) | 32.0 (89.6) | 29.4 (84.9) | 49.0 (120.2) |
| Mean daily maximum °C (°F) | 15.7 (60.3) | 16.4 (61.5) | 19.3 (66.7) | 22.7 (72.9) | 28.1 (82.6) | 33.5 (92.3) | 36.9 (98.4) | 37.0 (98.6) | 31.9 (89.4) | 27.2 (81.0) | 20.9 (69.6) | 16.9 (62.4) | 25.5 (77.9) |
| Daily mean °C (°F) | 10.4 (50.7) | 10.8 (51.4) | 13.1 (55.6) | 15.8 (60.4) | 20.3 (68.5) | 25.2 (77.4) | 28.3 (82.9) | 28.7 (83.7) | 25.0 (77.0) | 20.7 (69.3) | 15.3 (59.5) | 11.6 (52.9) | 18.8 (65.8) |
| Mean daily minimum °C (°F) | 5.2 (41.4) | 5.2 (41.4) | 6.8 (44.2) | 8.9 (48.0) | 12.6 (54.7) | 16.8 (62.2) | 19.7 (67.5) | 20.5 (68.9) | 18.1 (64.6) | 14.1 (57.4) | 9.6 (49.3) | 6.4 (43.5) | 12.0 (53.6) |
| Record low °C (°F) | −4.3 (24.3) | −4.0 (24.8) | −5.2 (22.6) | −0.3 (31.5) | 3.0 (37.4) | 5.6 (42.1) | 9.8 (49.6) | 11.2 (52.2) | 8.0 (46.4) | 3.5 (38.3) | −0.7 (30.7) | −4.0 (24.8) | −5.2 (22.6) |
| Average precipitation mm (inches) | 69.0 (2.72) | 57.9 (2.28) | 51.6 (2.03) | 43.8 (1.72) | 35.3 (1.39) | 13.9 (0.55) | 6.6 (0.26) | 14.3 (0.56) | 39.8 (1.57) | 45.9 (1.81) | 58.0 (2.28) | 60.4 (2.38) | 496.4 (19.54) |
| Average precipitation days (≥ 1.0 mm) | 8.7 | 7.8 | 8.2 | 6.3 | 4.1 | 2.5 | 0.9 | 1.9 | 3.8 | 5.6 | 5.7 | 8.0 | 63.5 |
| Average relative humidity (%) | 77 | 75 | 74 | 72 | 66 | 59 | 52 | 54 | 61 | 69 | 75 | 78 | 68 |
| Mean monthly sunshine hours | 155.5 | 170.0 | 209.9 | 214.8 | 259.7 | 271.1 | 322.9 | 297.8 | 241.4 | 214.7 | 168.3 | 147.8 | 2,673.9 |
Source 1: Institut National de la Météorologie (humidity 1961-1990, sun 1981–2010) (Note: The Station ID for Jendouba is 22525111.)
Source 2: NOAA
