= Aïn Draham =

- City
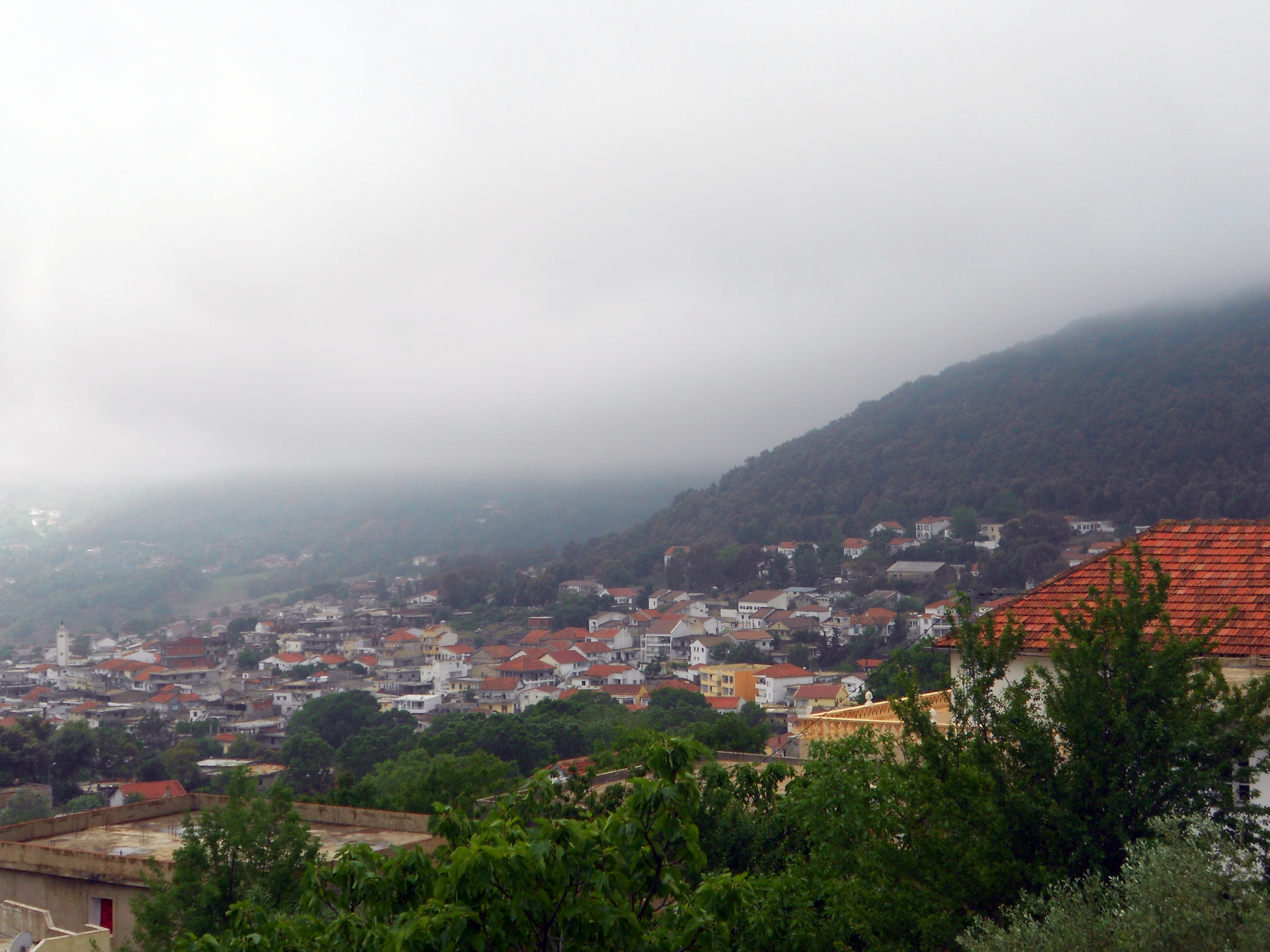

- Location in Tunisia
- Coordinates: 36°47′N 8°42′E
- Country: Tunisia
- Governorate: Jendouba Governorate

Population (2014)
  - Total: 9,788
- Time zone: UTC1 (CET)

Aïn Draham (عين دراهم Ɛin drahim) is a city in northwestern Tunisia in the Jendouba Governorate, situated 25 kilometers south of Tabarka near the border with Algeria. Historically a military outpost, summer resort and souq, today it is a regional economic hub.

The city is the capital of a delegation of 40,372 inhabitants. The city itself has an estimated population of 10,843 inhabitants (according to the census of 2004). It is located at an altitude of 800 meters on the slopes of the Djebel Bir (1014 m), one of the Kroumirie mountains. The city is located in one of the most humid areas of Tunisia and holds the record for the highest average rainfall at 1534 mm per year. Rainfalls are one of the major factors influencing landslides, often occurring in this area.

Its name describes the sulfurous hot springs in the area used by the Romans in antiquity. Ruins of Roman baths are also found in the area.

== History ==
Aïn Draham was originally a French military base

In 1930, it became a multi-purpose tourist resort intended to retain the French colonists guesthouse, residences, administrative tourism, etc.). The forest situation of the city and its colonial heritage (architecture, red roof tiles and local crafts) offers it advantages for interior tourism: thermal baths, hydrotherapy, game hunting, in particular wild boars, hiking, equestrian or MTB trails, green tourism, and sports.

== Gallery ==
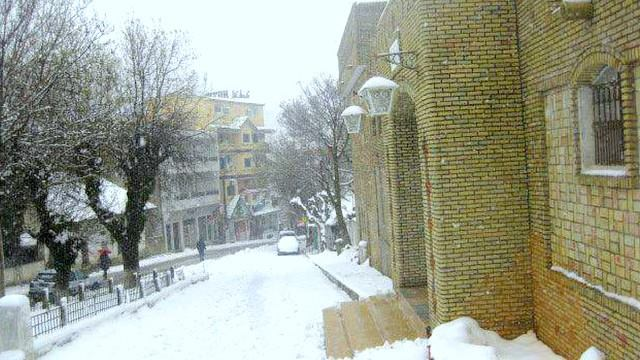

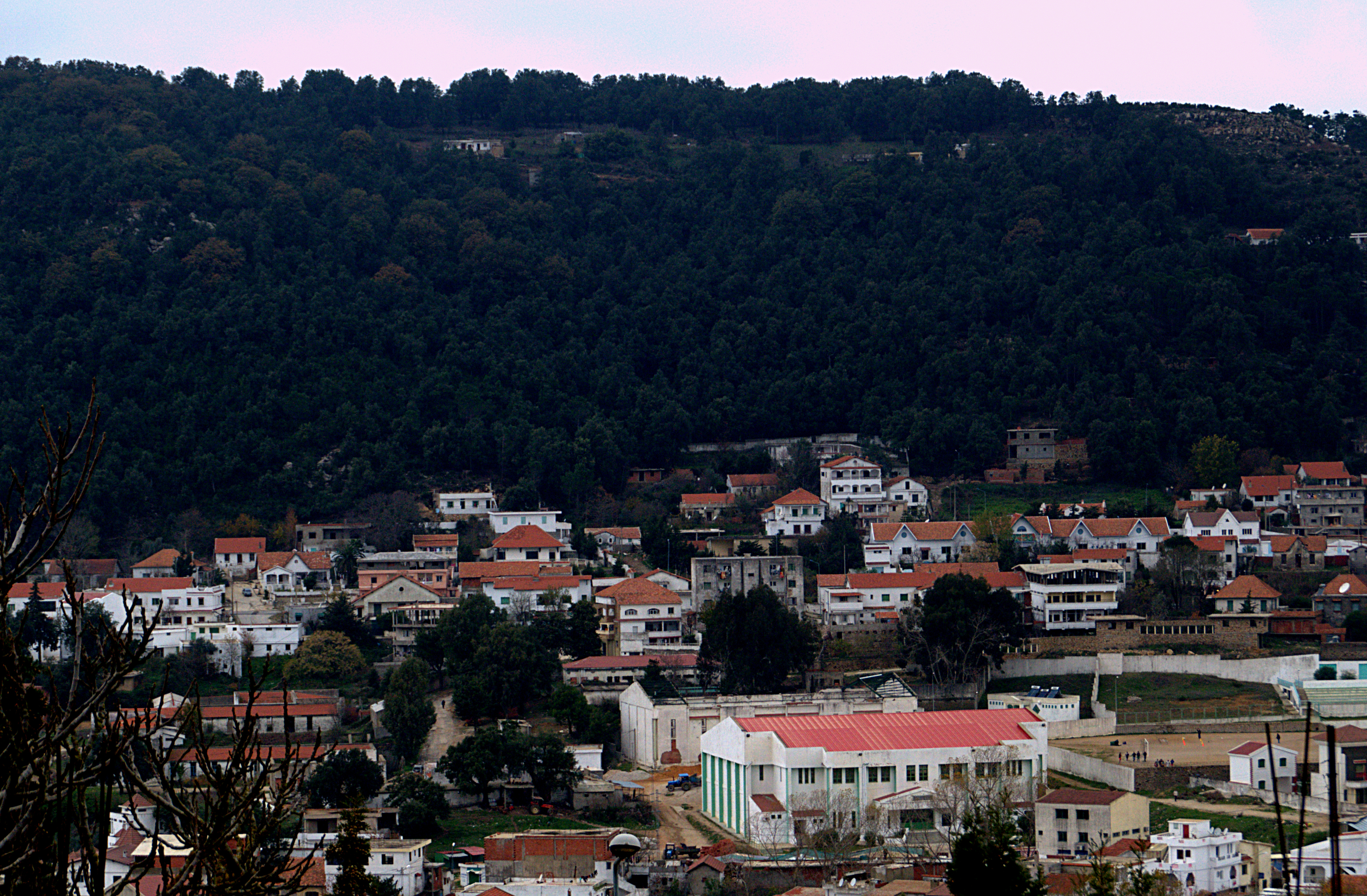

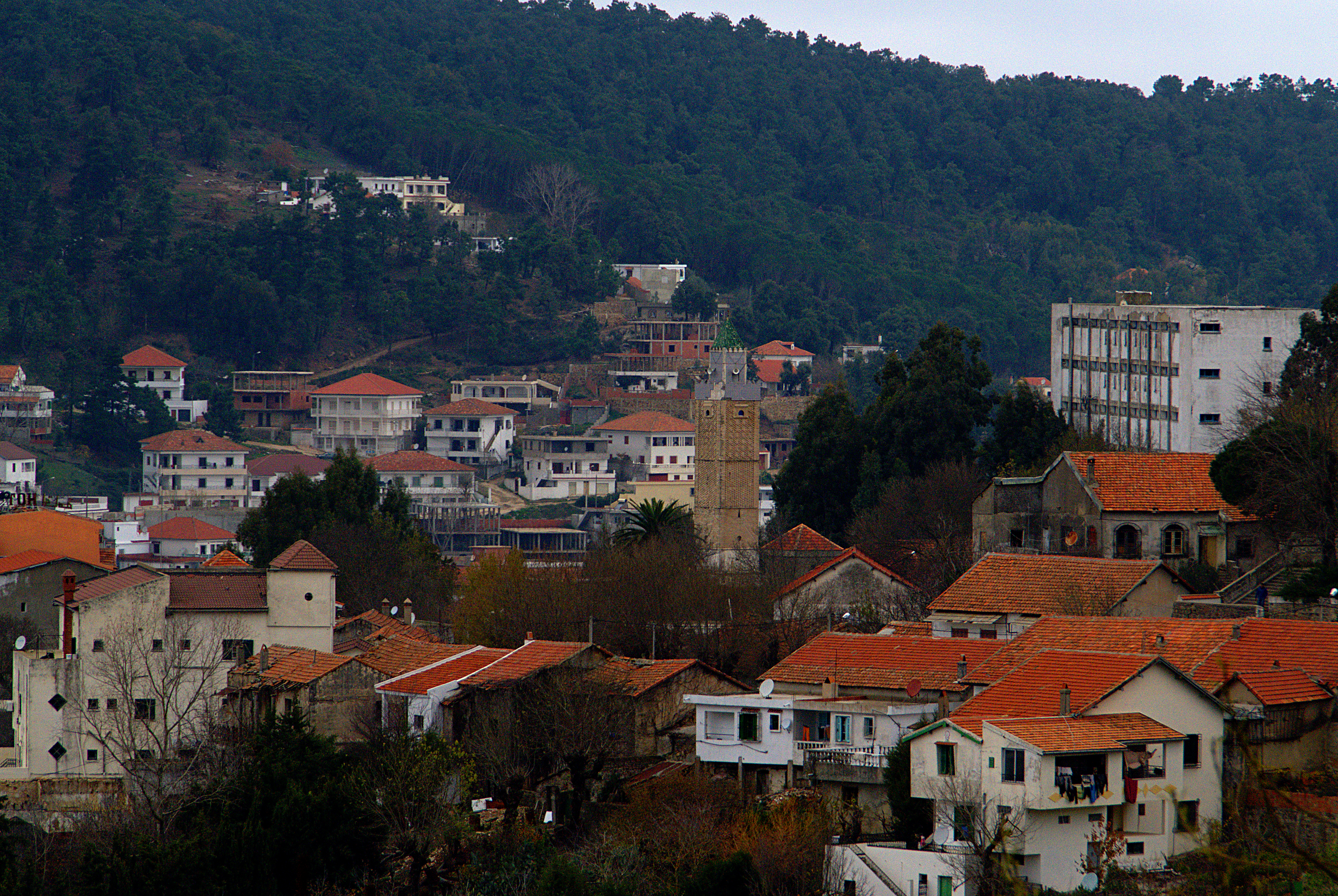

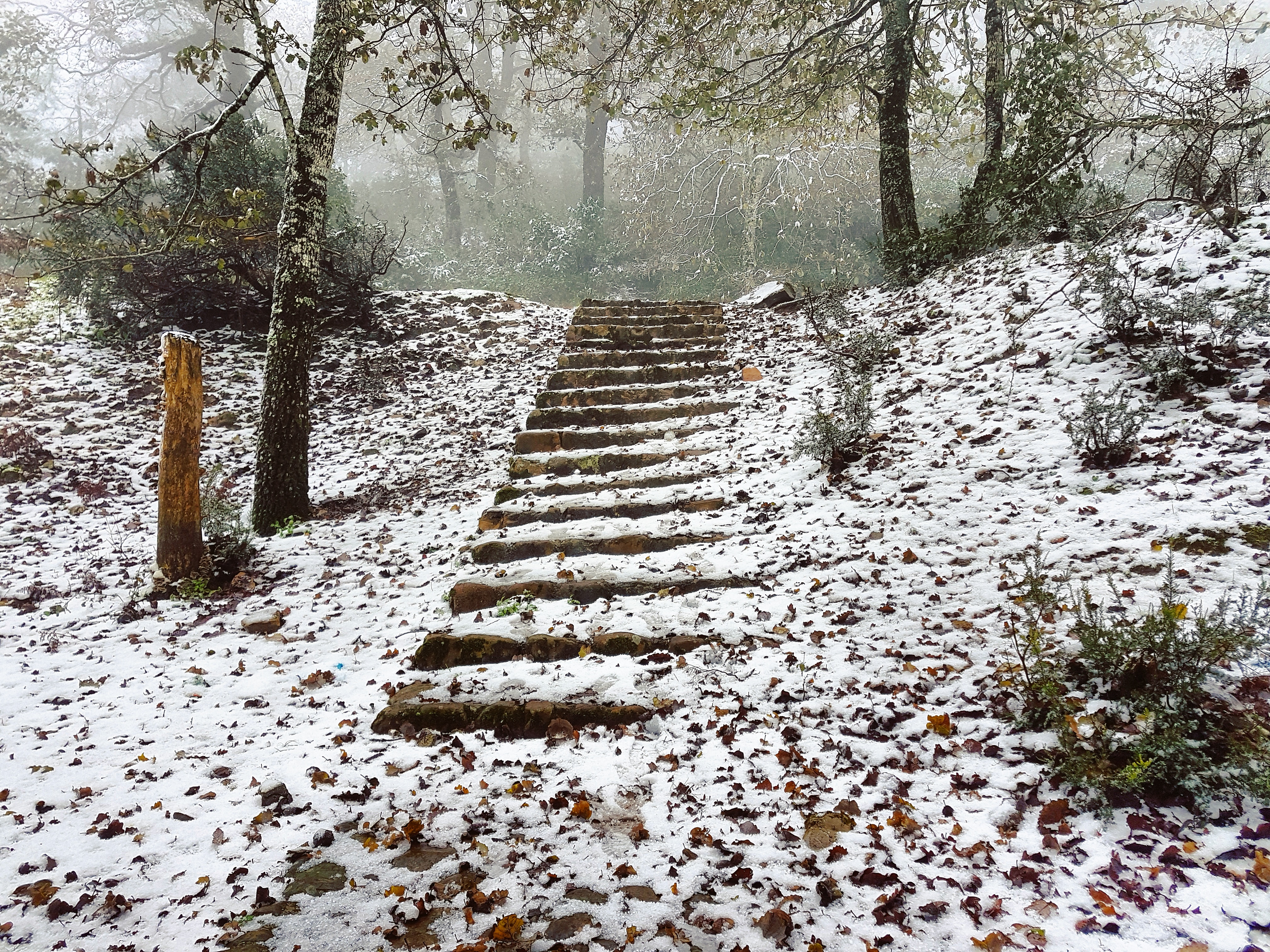

== Climate ==
Climate data for Aïn Draham
Month	Jan	Feb	Mar	Apr	May	Jun	Jul	Aug	Sep	Oct	Nov	Dec	Year
Average precipitation mm (inches)	250 (9.8)	196 (7.7)	159 (6.3)	124 (4.9)	80 (3.1)	25 (1.0)	6 (0.2)	9 (0.4)	66 (2.6)	140 (5.5)	204 (8.0)	275 (10.8)	1,534 (60.3)
