= Jendouba Governorate =

Governorate of Tunisia

Jendouba Governorate جندوبة
- Governorate
- Map of Tunisia with Jendouba highlighted

- Subdivisions of Jendouba Governorate
- Coordinates: 36°30′N 8°47′E
- Country: Tunisia
- Created: 21 June 1956
- Capital: Jendouba

Government
  - Governor: Hichem Hassoumi (since 2024)

Area
  - Total: 3,102 km^{2} (1,198 sq mi)
  - Rank: Ranked 15th of 24

Population (2014)
  - Total: 401,477
  - Rank: Ranked 12th of 24
  - Density: 129.4/km^{2} (335.2/sq mi)
- Time zone: UTC+01 (CET)
- Postal prefix: xx
- ISO 3166 code: TN-32

Jendouba Governorate (Tunisian Arabic: ولاية جندوبة, romanized: Wilāyat Jandūbah, pronounced [ʒænˈduːbæ]; French: Gouvernorat de Jendouba), known before 1966 as Souk El Arba Governorate, is one of the 24 governorates of Tunisia. It is predominantly in the high hills of the Tell Atlas in north-western Tunisia, bordering Algeria and the Mediterranean Sea. It covers an area of 3,102 km^{2} (1,198 sq mi) and has a population of 401,477 (2014 census). The capital is Jendouba. The economy of the Jendouba governorate is primarily based on cereal farming, livestock, market gardening, and tree cultivation. The agricultural land area covers 286,200 hectares, representing 92% of the governorate's total area and nearly 3.4% of the country's agricultural area. Forests cover 118,470 hectares.

== Geography ==
The governorate of Jendouba is located in the northwest of Tunisia, 150 km (93 mi) from the capital. It is bordered by the governorates of Kef and Siliana in the south, the governorate of Béja in the east, and it is 135 km (84 mi) away from the border with Algeria in the west, and the Mediterranean Sea to the north, with a 25 km (16 mi) long coastline.

The northern portion of the governorate is dominated by the Kroumirie Mountains, a mountainous region covered with extensive cork oak forests and one of the best-watered areas in North Africa, receiving between 1,000 and 1,500 mm of rainfall annually. The Kroumirie region extends south of the Mediterranean Sea and north of the Wadi Majardah (Medjerda), stretching east from the Algerian border to Mount Al-Abyad. The Medjerda River (Wadi Majardah), Tunisia's only perennially flowing river, rises in northeastern Algeria and flows northeastward toward the Gulf of Tunis, with Jendouba among its principal riverine settlements.

== Administrative divisions ==
The governorate is divided into nine delegations (mutamadiyat), listed below with their populations at the 2004 and 2014 Censuses:

Delegation	Area in km^{2}	Population (2004 Census)	Population (2014 Census)
Aïn Draham	489	40,372	35,400
Balta-Bou Aouane	297	42,229	38,764
Bou Salem	286	36,061	35,501
Fernana	391	52,690	47,690
Ghardimaou	507	67,955	64,170
Jendouba Sud	255	68,597	72,337
Jendouba Nord	298	44,195	40,779
Oued Meliz	200	19,015	17,843
Tabarka	374	45,494	48,993

== Climate ==
Jendouba is known for having the rainiest climate in the country, with annual precipitation reaching 1,000 mm (39 in) on the coast and exceeding 1,500 mm (59 in) in Aïn Draham. The average temperature is between 5–10 °C (41–50 °F) in winter and between 25–30 °C (77–86 °F) in summer.

== Economy ==
The economy is mainly based on agriculture and livestock farming. The area of arable land is 286,200 hectares (707,000 acres), accounting for 92% of the total area of the governorate and nearly 3.4% of the country's arable land, as of 2009. The governorate of Jendouba contributes a significant share in the national production of strategic food products with 12 to 13.4% of cereal production, 26% of vegetables, 12 to 13.4% of milk and 16% of potatoes and 6 to 9% red meat, as of 2009. At the same year, it produced 35 to 51% of national wood production, 94% of cork and 29% of tobacco. However, in subsequent years some crops had a significant production decrease, such as the tobacco production that decreased to one-third in 2019 from 2011.

== Infrastructure ==
The governorate has a railway line connecting the capital to Algeria through the towns of Bousalem, Jendouba and Ghardimaou to Tunis, over 75.6 km (47.0 mi). The governorate's airport is Tabarka–Aïn Draham International Airport.

== Tourism ==
The region has a golf course and a marina. It offers cultural tourism focused on a diverse archaeological heritage, such as Bulla Regia and Chemtou, and annual festivals such as the Tabarka Jazz Festival. Other attraction destinations include El Feidja National Park.

== Education ==
The governorate of Jendouba has 31 middle schools and 18 high schools. There is a tourism school in Aïn Draham and a health care school in Jendouba. The University of Jendouba consists of a faculty, seven institutes, and five affiliated institutions.

== Politics ==
A list of Governors of Jendouba since the independence:

- Naceur Ben Jaafar (1956–1960)
- Béchir Bellagha (1960–1962)
- Habib Ben Mohamed Lahbib (1962–1964)
- Mongi Kooli (1964–1967)
- Abdelaziz Beltaïef (1967–1969)
- Mohamed Souyah (1969–1970)
- Mokhtar Zannad (1970–1971)
- Hassen Louzir (1971–1973)
- Abdelmalek Laârif (1973–1975)
- Saïd Robbana (1975–1978)
- Khelil Trad (1978–1981)
- Abderrazak Kéfi (1981–1982)
- Abderrazak Ayoub (1982–1984)
- Hamed Khanfir (1984–1987)
- Mohamed Fadhel Khelil (1987–1988)
- Mohamed Belhaj (1988–1990)
- Slaheddine El Abed (1990–1993)
- Mohamed Belghith (1993–1995)
- Abdallah Hadroug (1995–1996)
- Habib Ben Gamra (1996–2000)
- Ali Ksiksi (2000–2004)
- Mahmoud Bellalouna (2004–2005)
- Hédi Slim (2005–2010)
- Mohamed Faouzi Ben Arab (28 July 2010 – 30 December 2010)
- Mohamed Ben Abdallah (30 December 2010 – 2 February 2011)
- Béchir Kthiri (2 February 2011 – 22 February 2012)
- Mohamed Sidhom (22 February – 27 October 2012)
- Samir Rouihem (27 October 2012 – 24 October 2013)
- Néjib Khabbouchi (24 October 2013 – 9 April 2015)
- Habib Skandrani (9 April 2015 – 16 September 2016)
- Akrem Sebri (16 September 2016 – 29 October 2017)
- Mohamed Sedki Bouaoun (29 October 2017 – 13 February 2019)
- Ali Marmouri (13 February 2019 – 17 March 2022)
- Samir Kouka (6 June 2022 –)

== Notable people ==
- Boubaker Ayadi, author, professor and journalist.
- Salah Mejri, basketball player.
