= Mining industry of Tunisia =

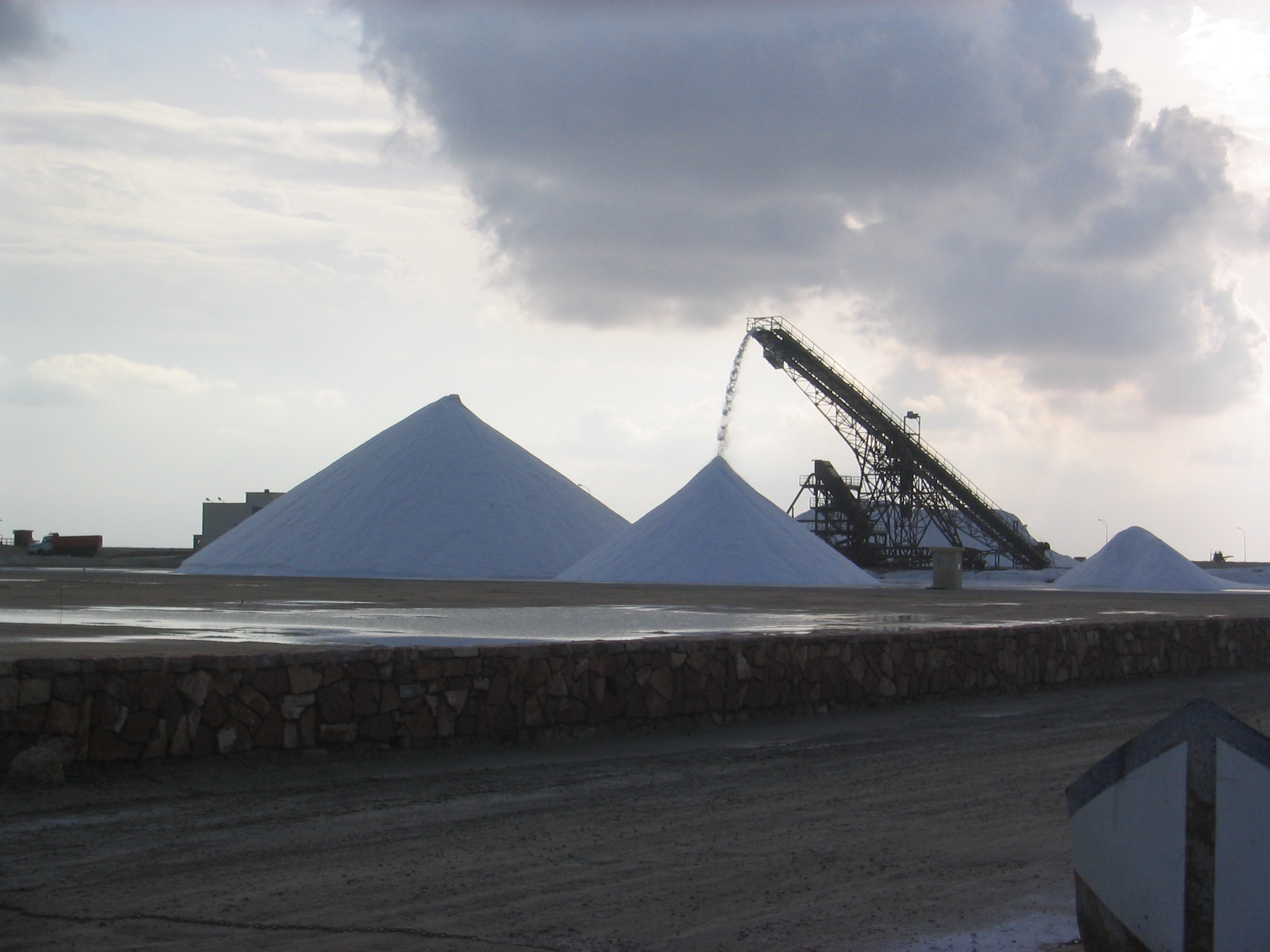
Salt evaporation pond operations at Zarzis

The mining industry of Tunisia focuses mainly on phosphate products such as fertilizer, industrial minerals (gypsum, clay, lime), iron ore, and salt. Mine ownership is limited to the Government of Tunisia, although operation by private entities is encouraged.

== History ==
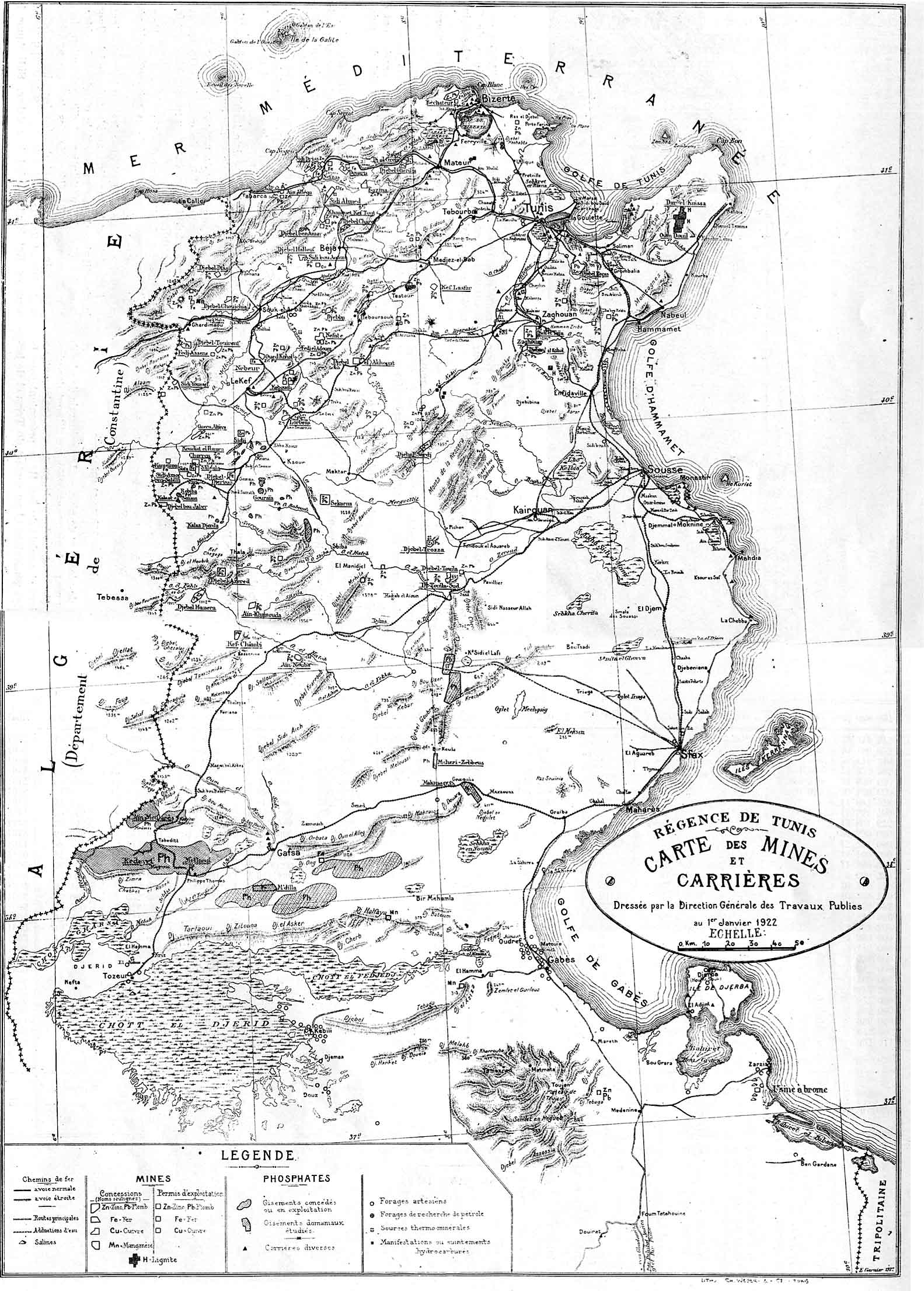
Tunisian mines (1922)

Mining has been practiced in the country since the times of the Berber, Roman, Arab, and French empires. In 1890, many areas were discovered for mining extractions. Zinc mining began in 1892, iron ore mining in 1906, and phosphate mining in 1996.

In Parry's Carthage and Tunis: Past and present: In two parts (1869), he discusses mining during late Ottoman Tunisia:

There are in Tunisia two lead mines, slightly argentiferous, at Jeba and at Jeladja. Some beds of iron are at Gebel Zerissa and in several other mountains lying along the frontiers of Algeria. Most of the mines are situated in the northwest part of the regency. Marine salt is taken from several sebkas or shallow salt lakes, where it is embedded on the surface in large quantities. Gebel Hadifa contains a considerable mine of rock salt. Plaster and lime are extracted on a large scale in the central and southern provinces, and soda is furnished, especially by the district of Cairwan."

During the colonial period, when Tunisia was a protectorate of France, mining was a major part of the economy, particularly in rural areas. Gendarmes were formed by the colonial police force and were used to suppress labor unrest, particularly during the Great Depression. This led to unemployment in the mining industry due to increased economic prices.

By 1962, mining labor unions accounted for 11% of organized labor (second only to government employees). Jobs in mining began decreasing in Tunisia during the 1970s, as operations transitioned from underground mining to open-pit mining. Following the 2010 Tunisian Revolution in which President Zine El Abidine Ben Ali was deposed, mining in Tunisia declined. This was followed by nationwide labour disputes and strikes. Opposition to the hiring practices at the mines of the Compagnie des phosphates de Gafsa in Gafsa resulted in a protest at the operations lasting over six months. In 2011, further protests continued for more than three years at the mines in Moularès and Redeyef, resulting in blockaded roads and the halting of mining operations.

== Production and impact ==
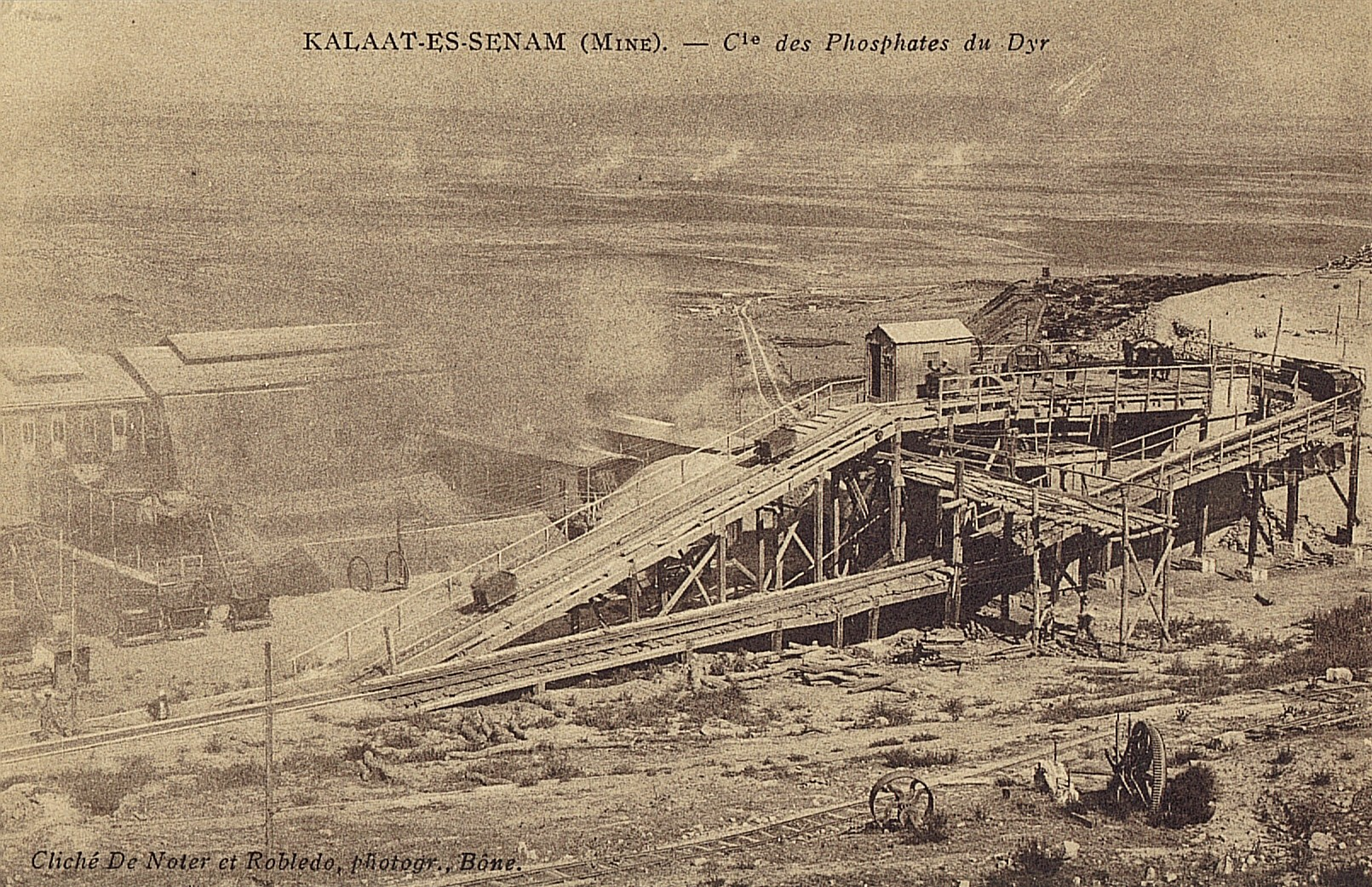
A phosphate mine in Tunisia (c. 1930)

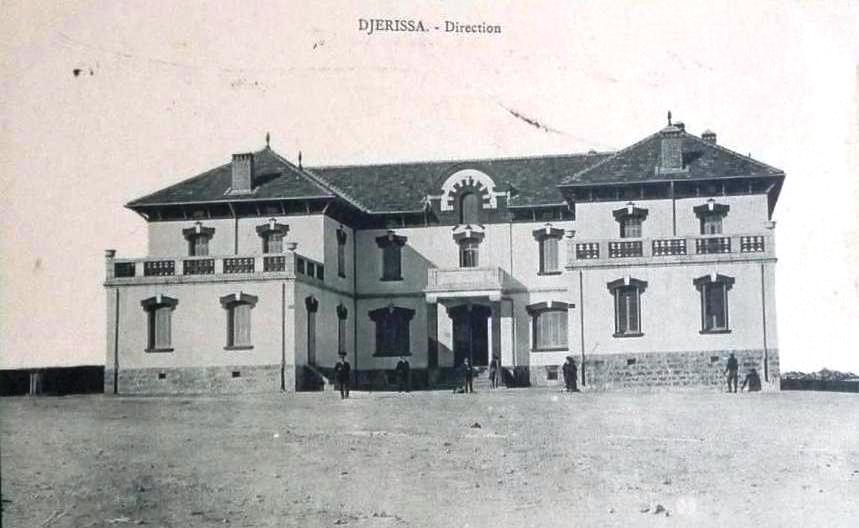
Headquarters, Société du Djebel Djerissa (1907)

Tunisia is the fifth largest exporter of phosphates in the world. Extraction of phosphate is the most important mining sector in the country, boosting the economy through exports by some 45%. The mineral sector as a whole contributes to 3% of the GDP. Iron ore is extracted at the underground mine at Djerissa and also at the open-pits of Tamera and Douaria; this activity is done by the Société du Djebel Djerissa, which is a public sector undertaking.

Mining in Central Tunisia and the north–south axis area, covering an area of 43,000 square kilometres (17,000 sq mi), is not fully developed, but iron ore is being extracted to a considerable degree. In the northeast of central Tunisia, extraction of fluorine and baryte have been very substantial.

== Legal framework ==
Mining and mineral exploration is legislated by the Tunisian Mining Code (law No. 2003–30 of April 28, 2003). Laws on fuel minerals are the Hydrocarbons Code (law No. 99–93 of August 17, 1999) and its supplement (law No. 2002–23 of February 2002). The government of Tunisia develops geological and geophysical maps through the National Office of Mines, and regulates all mining operations, which are government owned. Despite the public ownership of all mines in Tunisia, private operation of the mines is promoted by the National Office of Mines. When a mining operation is started, it is granted a five-year reprieve on taxation, followed by a 25% taxation on profits.

== Outlook ==
Production of phosphate rock and phosphate fertilizers are likely to increase with the commissioning of the Celamin and the TIFERT projects. Cement export is expected to get a boost with exports to Algeria.

== Bibliography ==
- Perry, Amos (1869). Carthage and Tunis: past and present: in two parts (Public domain ed.). Providence Press Company, Printers. p. 379.
