= Lézard rouge =

Train in Tunisia

Coordinates: 34.3333°N 8.3667°E

Lézard Rouge
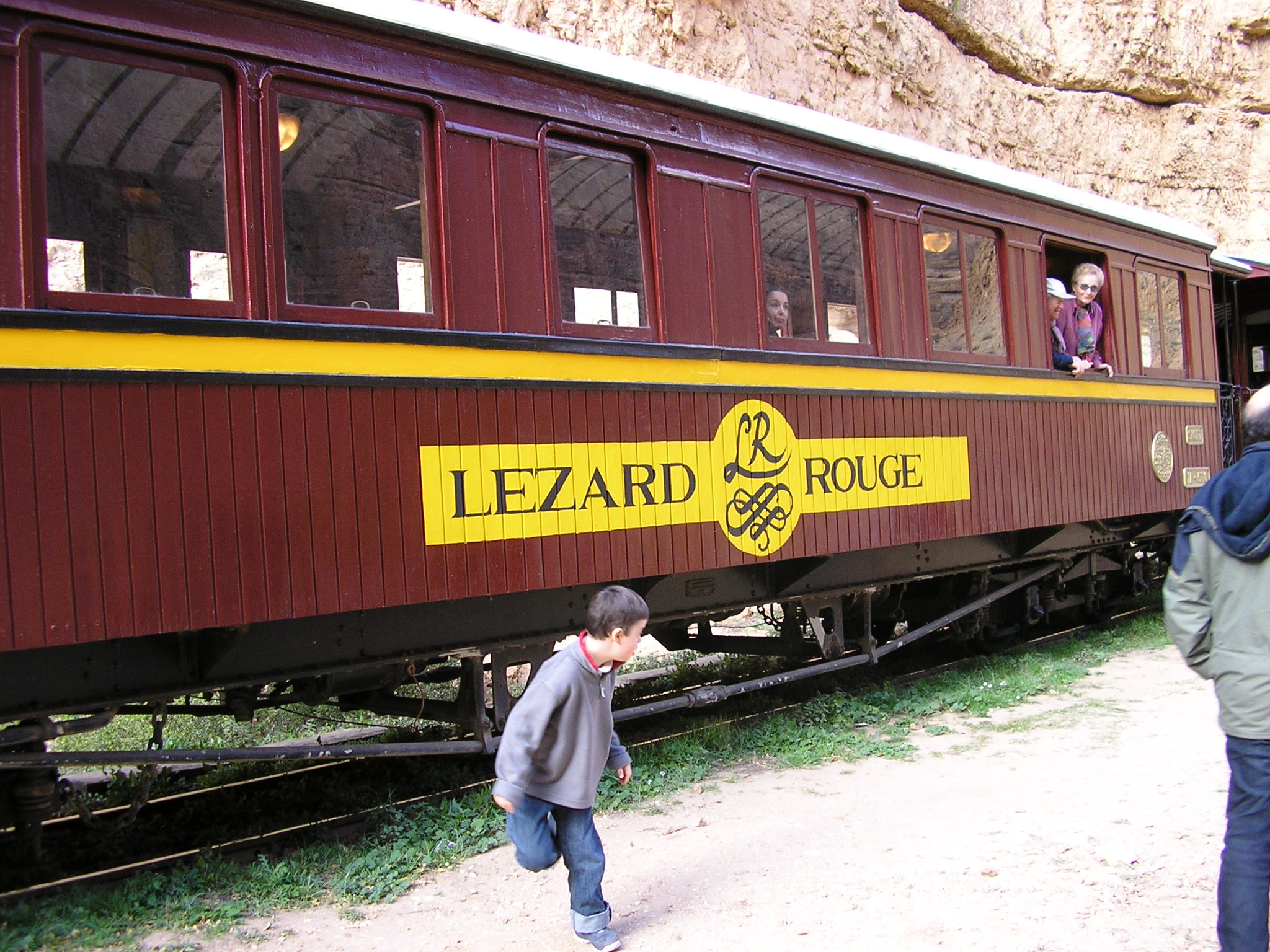
- One of the carriages of the Lézard Rouge

Overview
- Other name(s): (French for "Red Lizard")
- Owner: Bey of Tunis
- Stations: Metlaoui to Redeyef, Selja Gorges,

The Lézard Rouge (French for "Red Lizard") is a historic Tunisian train, once the property of the Bey of Tunis, but now used for tourists. It runs from Metlaoui to Redeyef and passes through the spectacular Selja Gorges, taking some 40 minutes for the journey. The railway was built for mining trains carrying phosphates.

== See also ==
- "I treni di Tozeur"
