= Société du Djebel-Djérissa =

Tunisian iron ore mining company

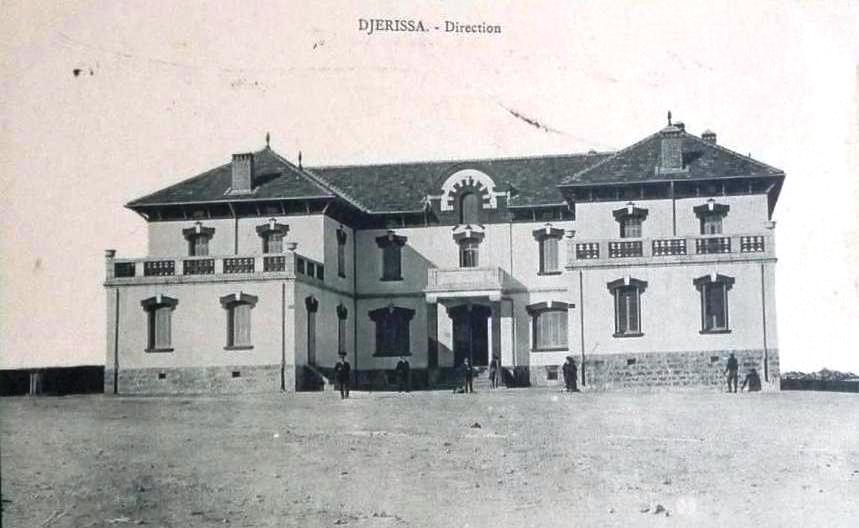
- Headquarters in 1907
- Industry: Iron ore mining
- Founded: July 11, 1899; 127 years ago in Paris, France
- Headquarters: Jérissa, Tunisia
- Website: www.sdd.tn

The Société du Djebel-Djérissa (SDD) is a Tunisian iron ore mining company founded in 1899 that began operations in 1907. It produced up to 700,000 tons per year of hematite ore in the years before World War II. Production dropped during the war. The company was nationalized in 1961. Today levels of output are around 200,000 tons annually. The company operates an iron ore mine at Jérissa and also owns mining rights at Tamera.

== Location ==
Locations in Tunisia

The company operates an iron ore mine at Jérissa. Djerissa is in the Métlaoui region of central Tunisia, where it sometimes snows in winter. The 900 metres (3,000 ft) Jebel Djérissa is a partial dome of limestone about 40 kilometres (25 mi) south of El Kef. It is faulted and collapsed around the perimeter, and contains important deposits of brown hematite. At first Hematite was mined at Jérissa with iron content of 54%, and from 1974 Siderite with a content of 40% was also recovered. Typically the Siderite is found below the Hematite, under the paleohydrostatic level.

The railway from Tunis to Kalaa-Djerda was opened in 1906 and carried ore from the Djerissa and Slata mines. The 1 metre (3 ft 3 in) gauge railway from the Djérissa mine to the port of La Goulette (Tunis) is 215 kilometres (134 mi) long.

The company also owns mining rights at Tamera. The Tamera-Douahria group is an important iron region in northern Tunisia about 150 kilometres (93 mi) west of Tunis. It is estimated to have exploitable iron ore reserves of about 9 million tons. The most common minerals are Goethite, Hematite and Limonite.

== History ==
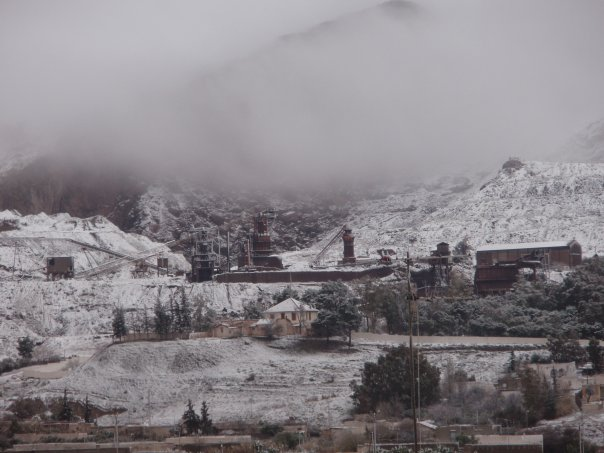
The mine after a winter snowfall

La Compagnie des mines du Djebel-Djerissa was created in 1899 with a capital of 4.5 million francs divided into 9,000 shares of 500 francs. In 1905, the nominal share value was reduced to 400 francs and the capital was reduced to 3.6 million francs. The Société du Djebel-Djerissa became in effect a subsidiary of the Société Mokta El Hadid of Algeria, which took a stake of 5,200 shares in the mine in 1906. In 1920, the 9,000 shares of 400 francs were divided into 36,000 shares of 100 francs.

On 13 June 1907, Philippe de Cerner, director of Mokta-el-Hadid, arrived at the mine, where 1,000 workers of all types were engaged in "feverish activity". They had already extracted 30,000 tons of ore, the post & telegraphs office had been opened since 1 May 1907, and the engineers expected the railway works to be completed for a first shipment in January 1908. The first train carrying ore from the mine to the newly built quays at La Goulette arrived in March 1908. 115,239 tons were extracted in the first year, and this was doubled in 1909. In 1910, 256,388 tons were embarked at La Goulette in 71 ships with an average capacity of 3,600 tons.

The mountain was steadily removed from the top, and already by 1911 was a plateau rather than a peak. In 1911, the Djerissa mine was shipping almost 1,000 tons of ore a day. Ore was carried down by gravity-driven wagons to large hoppers standing over the railway, from which it was poured into empty railway wagons. Ore was shipped to La Goulette in wagons holding 30 tons of ore. The wagons had hinged side walls that could be opened at the port so the ore would pour out. These were poured into skips mounted on trolleys, which then dumped the ore into galleries 140 by 40 metres (460 by 130 ft) with a total storage capacity of about 80,000 tons. The ore was loaded into ships via a conveyor belt fed ore from a hopper, with the hopper either loaded directly from the 30 ton wagons or from the storage galleries. About 80 people were employed at the docks, loading 70,000 tons per month.

During World War I (1914–18), the mine shipped 353,945 tons of ore in 1916, much of it used by English forges making war munitions. In the years before World War II (1939–1945), production averaged 600,000 to 700,000 tons per year. Production reached 718,000 tonnes in 1937. 647,551 tons were extracted in 1938. During the early part of the war, the storage and embarkation facilities at La Goulette suffered serious damage and wrecks near the wharf made it inaccessible to large vessels. Production increased later in the war and after the war as the facilities were repaired. Output in tons was 29,703 (1943), 88,863 (1944), 152,450 (1945), 183,705 (1946) and 403,691 (1947). Estimated exports in 1948 were:

England	450,000 tons
Netherlands	70,000 tons
France	30,000 tons
USA	30,000 tons
Italy	20,000 tons
Total	600,000 tons

In 1949, the company was among the 20 largest in France, with capitalization of 5.7 billion francs. Henri Lafond was chairman and chief executive officer of the Société du Djebel-Djérissa from 1945 to 1962, and director of various other companies. Jacques Lucius was chairman of the Société du Djebel Djérissa from 1955 to 1966. He was a director from 1956 to 1975. He was also director of the Compagnie des phosphates et du chemin de fer de Gafsa from 1956 to 1968, and negotiated the entry of the Tunisian government into both companies.

The village of Jerissa was built from scratch in a barren valley dominated by the brown silhouette of the Jebel Djérissa, the iron mountain. In 1911, it had a church, dispensary and playing field. It developed into a French town with a church and cemetery, red tiles, play circles, three tennis courts and a bowling alley. The Djerissa football club was in the national division in 1969–70. The town thrived until the 1970s with a population of more than 3,000 workers from around Tunisia, as well as Maltese, Italians, Spaniards, Algerians, Moroccans and, Senegalese.

Starting in 1960, extraction began by quarry and underground shafts. The company became publicly owned on 31 December 1961, and was still a state company as of 2018. As of 2009 the mining town was run down and the workforce had been reduced to 300. In September 2012, it was reported that the company had extracted 200,000 tonnes in the past year, of which 20,000 tonnes were for export. The Hamima mine was expected to be opened soon.

== Sources ==
- Bonin, Hubert (2001), La Banque de l'Union parisienne (1874/1904 – 1974) (in French), Paris: Editions Plage – via Annales des Mines
- Ben Brik, Taoufik (17 September 2009), "La mine de Jebel Jerissa : Macondo", L'Humanité (in French)
- Centres de production (in French), SDD
- Clozier, R. (1950), "Les sociétés milliardaires en France", L'Information Géographique, 14–2
- Fonds Jacques Lucius (1931-1975) (in French), Archives nationales de France
- Granottier, A. (1948), La mine de fer de Djerissa (PDF) (in French)
- Lacour-Gayet, Jacques (1911), "Chemins de fer de Tunisie", Revue des Deux Mondes (in French), 3
- Mine de Jerissa (in French), SDD
- Mine de Taméra (in French), SDD
- Société Djebel Djérissa (in French), Ministère de l’énergie, des mines et des énergies renouvelables
- "Société du Djebel-Djérissa (Tunisie)" (PDF), entreprises-coloniales.fr (in French), 27 June 2015
- "Tunisie: Augmentation de la production de fer à Jebel Djérissa", Babnet Tunisie (in French), 4 September 2012
