= Chebika =

Chebika is the name of:

- Chebika, Tozeur, a village and oasis in Tozeur Governorate, Tunisia
- Chebika, Kairouan, a town in Kairouan Governorate, Tunisia
