= Sra Ouertene mine =

Phosphate mine in Kef, Tunisia

- Location: Kef Governorate, Tunisia
- Products: Phosphates

The Sra Ouertene mine is a large mine located in Kef Governorate, Tunisia. It is one of the largest phosphates reserve in Tunisia with estimated reserves of 10 billion tonnes of ore grading 17% P_{2}O_{5}.

== See also ==
- Mining industry of Tunisia
