= Tagarbala =

Africa Proconsularis (125 AD)

Tagarbala was a Roman–Berber civitas of the province of Byzacena during late antiquity. It was a Roman Catholic diocese.

The town is identifiable with stone ruins at Bordj-Tamra, Tamera in modern Tunisia.

Roman Tagarbala was also the seat of an ancient Christian episcopal see. One bishop is known of this ancient diocese, Fortunatianus, who participated in the synod in Carthage in 484 called by the Vandal king Huneric, after which Fortunatianus was exiled.

Today Tagarbala survives as titular bishopric. Bishop Joseph Espaillat, is the titular bishop.
