= Mohamed Fadhel Khalil =

Tunisian businessman, politician, and diplomat

Mohamed Fadhel Khalil (d. May 31, 2017) was a Tunisian businessman, politician and diplomat. He served as the Minister of Social Affairs from 1992 to 1996. He was also the Tunisian Ambassador to Syria, Algeria and Austria. Additionally, he was the chief executive officer of the Compagnie des phosphates de Gafsa, and the Governor of Kef Governorate (1981–1982), Jendouba Governorate (1987–1988), and Sfax (1988–1990).
