= Mourad Melki =

Tunisian footballer

Personal information
- Full name: Mourad Melki
- Date of birth: 9 May 1975 (age 51)
- Place of birth: Jérissa, Tunisia
- Height: 1.78 m (5 ft 10 in)
- Position: Midfielder

Senior career*
Years	Team	Apps	(Gls)
1995–1999	Olympique Béja	110	(36)
1999–2007	Espérance Tunis	195	(40)
2007–2011	AS Marsa	80	(6)
2011	CS M'saken	21	(10)

International career
1998–2003	Tunisia	14	(2)
- * Club domestic league appearances and goals

Mourad Melki (Arabic: مراد المالكي) (born 9 May 1975) is a Tunisian former footballer who played as a midfielder.

He was a member of the Tunisian national team during the World Cups in 1998 and 2002.

== International goals ==
#	Date	Venue	Opponent	Score	Result	Competition
1	28 November 2001	Stade El Menzah, Tunis	Togo	1–0	1–0	Friendly
2	10 September 2003	Stade El Menzah, Tunis	Ivory Coast	2–0	3–2	Friendly
