= Selja Gorges =

Canyon in Tunisia

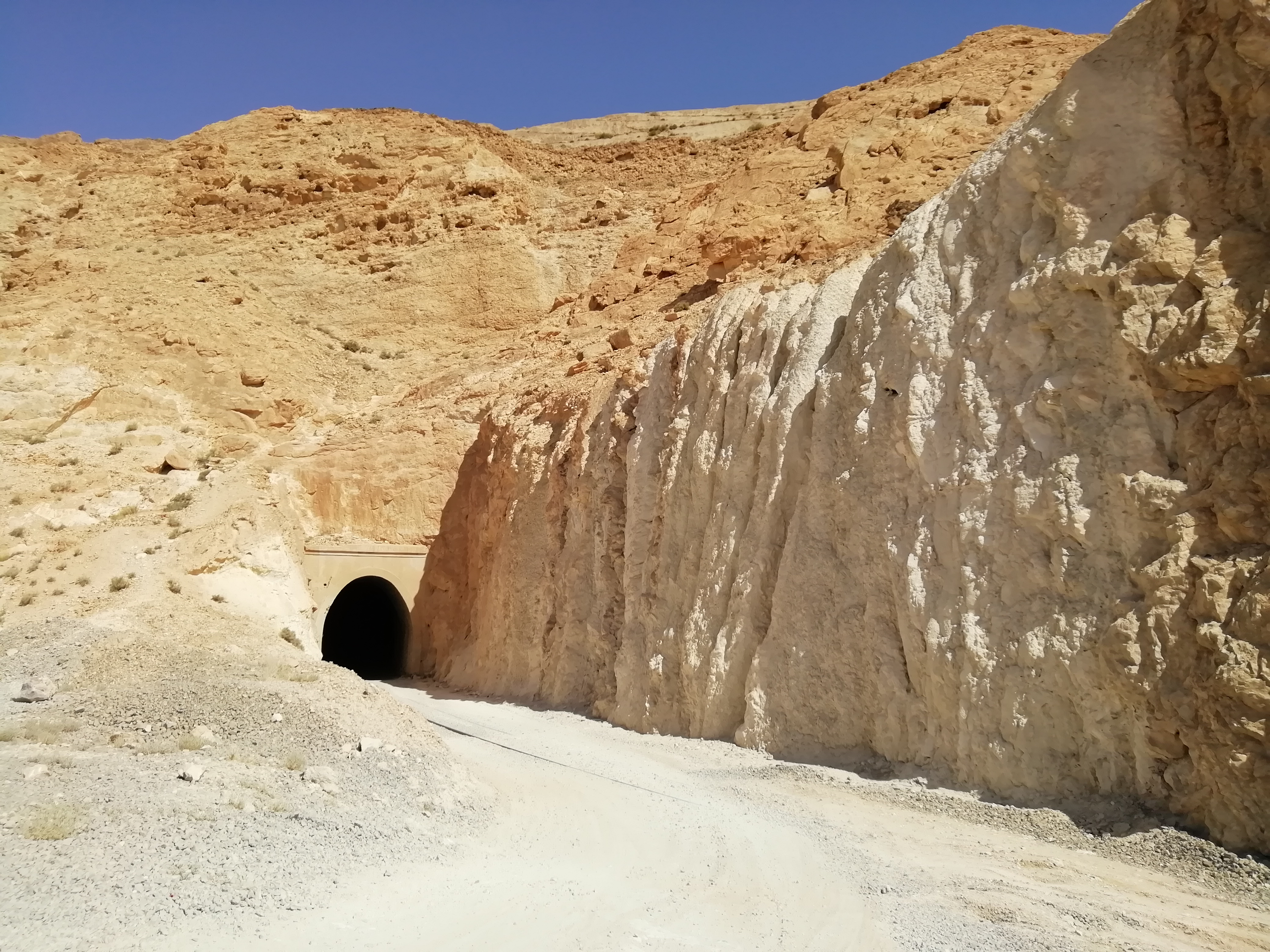
- Selja gorges with the train Lézard rouge

- Location within Tunisia

Naming
- Native name: Gorges de Selja (French)

Geography
- Country: Tunisia
- State: Gafsa Governorate
- Coordinates: 34°23′37″N 8°20′36″E
- Interactive map of Selja Gorges

Ramsar Wetland
- Official name: Les Gorges de Thelja
- Designated: 2 February 2012
- Reference no.: 2009

Selja Gorges (from the traditional transcription fr. Gorges de Selja) or the Thelja Gorges as more recently transcribed from Arabic (arabic حلق الثالجة) are located in southern Tunisia in Gafsa Governorate.

The gorges link the Gafsa Valley with the Redeyef plateau. The area contains abundant phosphate deposits.

== Ramsar Wetland ==
The Gorges are several kilometers long natural valley with deep ravines through which the Thelja Wadi runs a very sinuous course towards the Chott El Gharsa. The surroundings are mountainous and arid and form a part of the Djebels of the Saharan Atlas (with an elevation between 210m and 450m). An area of 675 ha is protected as Ramsar wetland, where the wadi's waters are present all year around (albeit with a very small flowrate).

The site contains 45 types of plants and trees among which: esparto or "alfa" grass Macrochloa tenacissima, compact rush Juncus conglomeratus, French tamarisk Tamarix gallica, caper Capparis spinosa, le Batoum, canes Arundo donax and bridal broom Retama monosper.

The most noticeable animals are the endangered golden eagle Aquila chrysaetos and the lizard Uromastyx acanthinura, known for its ability to wistand extreme desert conditions. In addition, the following animals are encountered in the area and justify the need to protect their habitats:

the spotted hyena Crocuta crocuta, the extremely rare Rüppell's sand fox Vulpes rueppellii, the African wildcat Felis silvestris lybica, the Tunisian (or Nabeul) tortoise Testudo graeca nabeulensis, the desert monitor Varanus griseus, the long-nosed leopard lizard Gambelia wislizenii, the European turtle dove Streptopelia turtur, the European bee-eater merops apiaster, the Montpellier snake Malpolon monspessulanus, The Moorish viper (Daboia mauritanica) and the Saharan horned viper Cerastes cerastes

For birds, in addition to the endangered golden eagle, the gorges also host the Eurasian eagle-owl (Bubo bubo), the Barbary partridge Alectoris barbara, the rock dove Columba livia, the European turtle dove (Streptopelia turtur), the crag martin (Ptyonoprogne rupestris) and the collared sand martin (Riparia riparia)

The site is potentially threatened by pollution as a result of the mining activities carried out upstream and constructions related to tourism, but it is part of a presidential programme created in 2009 to preserve the biotopes, reinforce the biological diversity, encourage ecological tourism, and support scientific research and tourism.

== Railway line ==
Railways, with Selja Gorges section in red.

In 1896, a railway line was built to link the port of Sfax and the town of Gabes (where the phosphate ore was processed) with the mining town of Métlaoui. The mining companies extended the line passed Metlaoui to the Redeyef plateau to transport phosphate extracted from the mines located there. Tracks had to be laid in the sinuous gorge, crossing the mountain range and required the construction of numerous tunnels and bridges.

In addition, a train for tourists made with renovated train cars from the phosphate mining named the Red Lizard takes people from Metlaoui into the gorges for the scenic ride. .

In September 2009, massive rains caused flooding of the plateau and the flood surge went into Gafsa's valley traveling through the Selja gorges. This caused massive damaged to the tracks and loss of wagons and closure of the line for a year until rebuilding and repairs were completed.

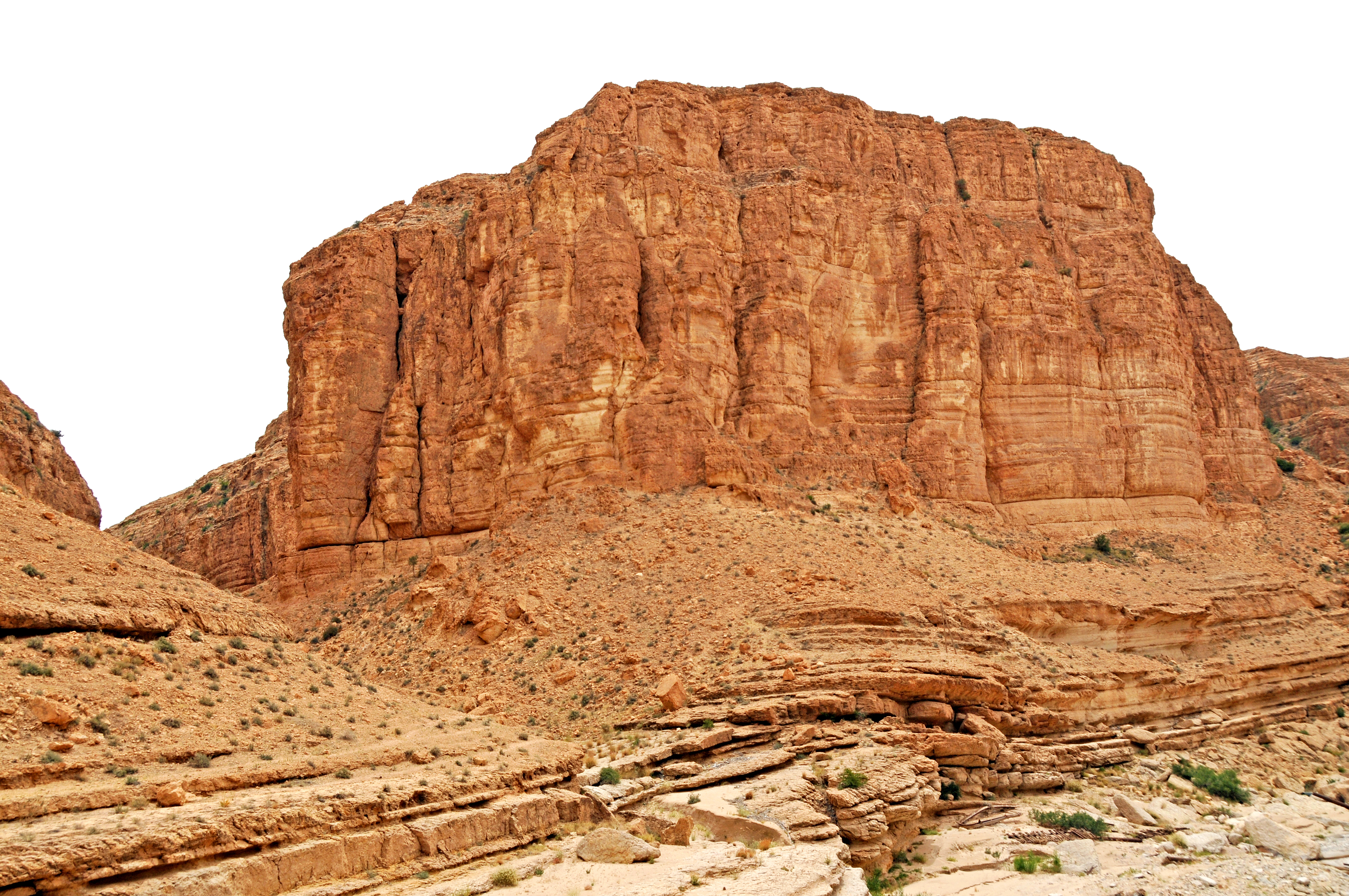
Red butte along the railway line

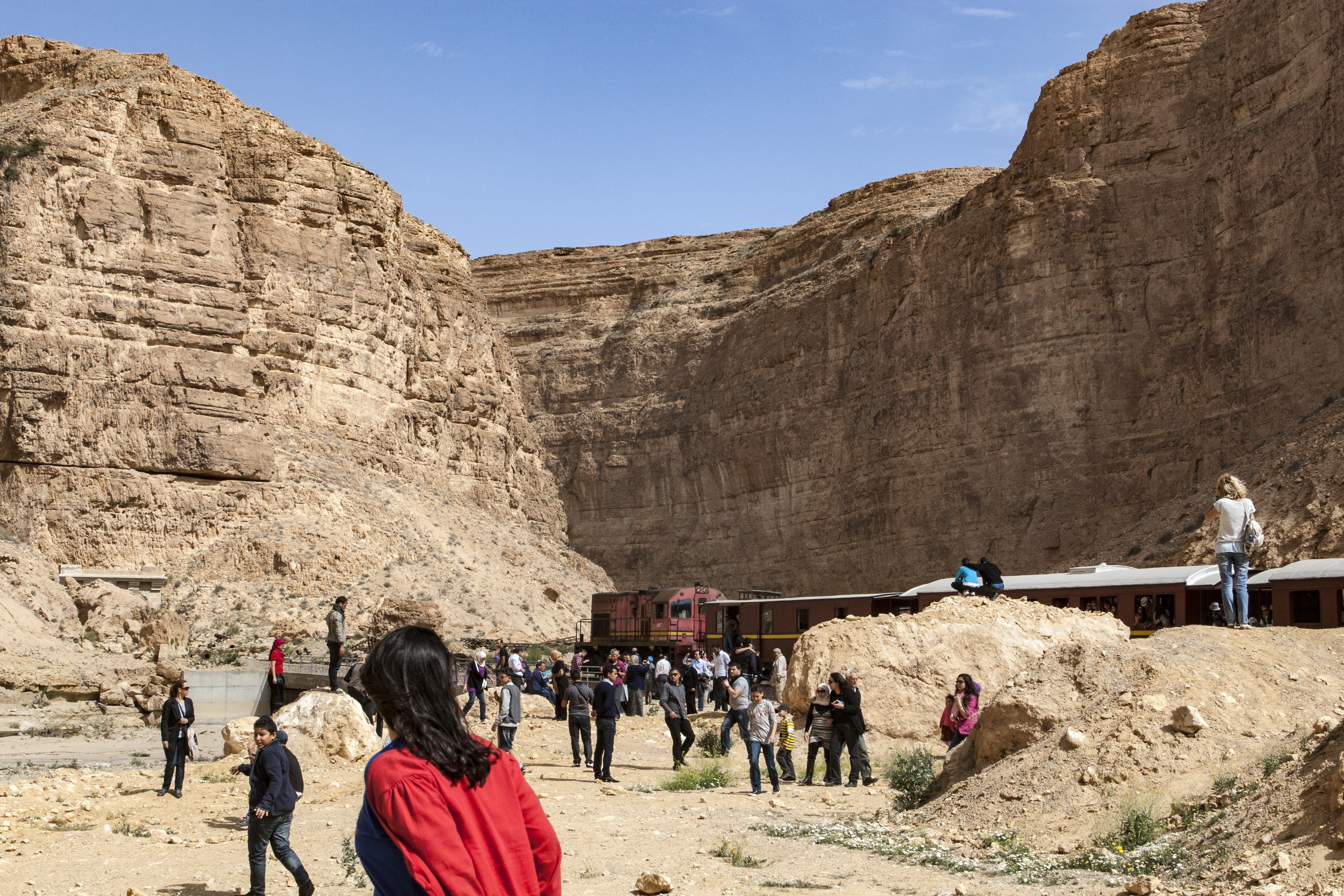
Tourists on the "Red Lizard" train, 2012

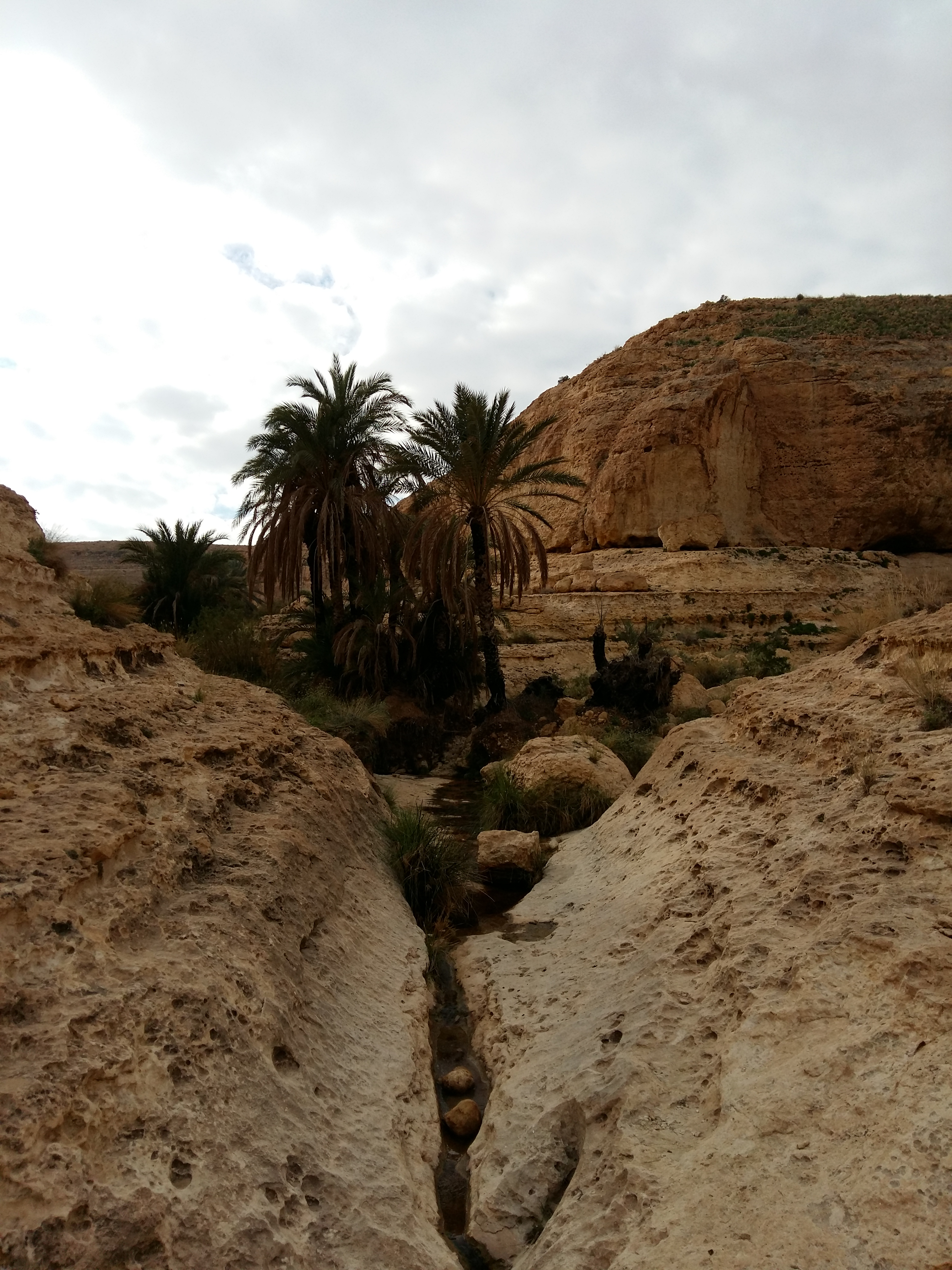
Selja Gorges 2016

== See also ==
- List of Ramsar Wetlands of International Importance
