= Compagnie des phosphates de Gafsa =

Tunisian mining company

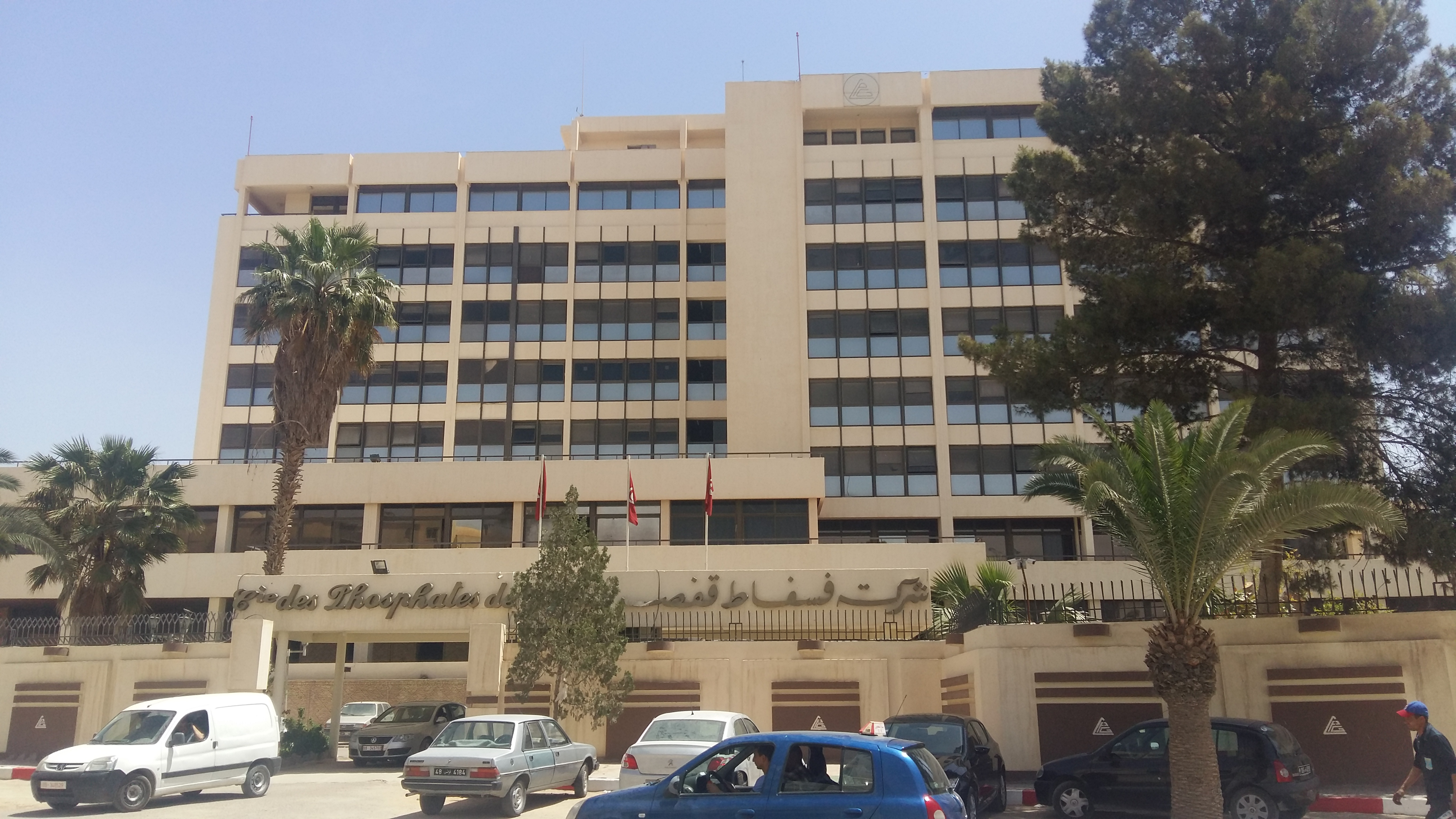
- Headquarters in Gafsa
- Type: Phosphates
- Industry: Mining
- Founded: 1897
- Defunct: 1994
- Fate: Merged with the CGT: Groupe chimique tunisien
- Headquarters: Gafsa, Tunisia
- Owner: Tunisian state
- Website: www.cpg.com.tn

The Compagnie des phosphates de Gafsa (Arabic: شركة فسفاط قفصة, Gafsa Phosphate Company) or CPG is a Tunisian phosphate mining company based in Gafsa, formed in the late 19th century during the French colonial era, and once the largest employer in the country. It was merged in 1994 with the Groupe chimique tunisien (CGT) to form the CPG-CGT group. Before the Tunisian revolution of 2011 the company was the fifth largest phosphate producer in the world, but since then strikes and social unrest have caused production to drop by half.

== Foundation ==
In April 1885 the French amateur geologist Philippe Thomas discovered rich layers of calcium phosphates on the north slope of Jebel Thelja in the Métlaoui region of western Tunisia. Further geological surveys and explorations found significant phosphate deposits to the south and north of the Île de Kasserine. The government at first offered a concession to exploit the phosphates only on condition of building a port to export the ore and a railway to carry it from the mines. There was a lack of interest at first.

Railways from the mines to the coast

After work began on expanding and modernizing the port of Sfax the government dropped the port construction requirement and allowed a concession to mine the ore and transport it by rail to Sfax. The Compagnie de Phosphate de Gafsa et de Chemin de Fer de Gafsa (CPGCFG, Gafsa Phosphate and Railway Company) was formed in 1897 by a group that included the Saint Gobain Chemical Company, Mukhtar Hadid Mining Company, Duparchy Company, several major French industrialists and many small investors. At the same time construction began of a railway line to link Metlaoui to Sfax.

== Colonial era (1899–1956) ==
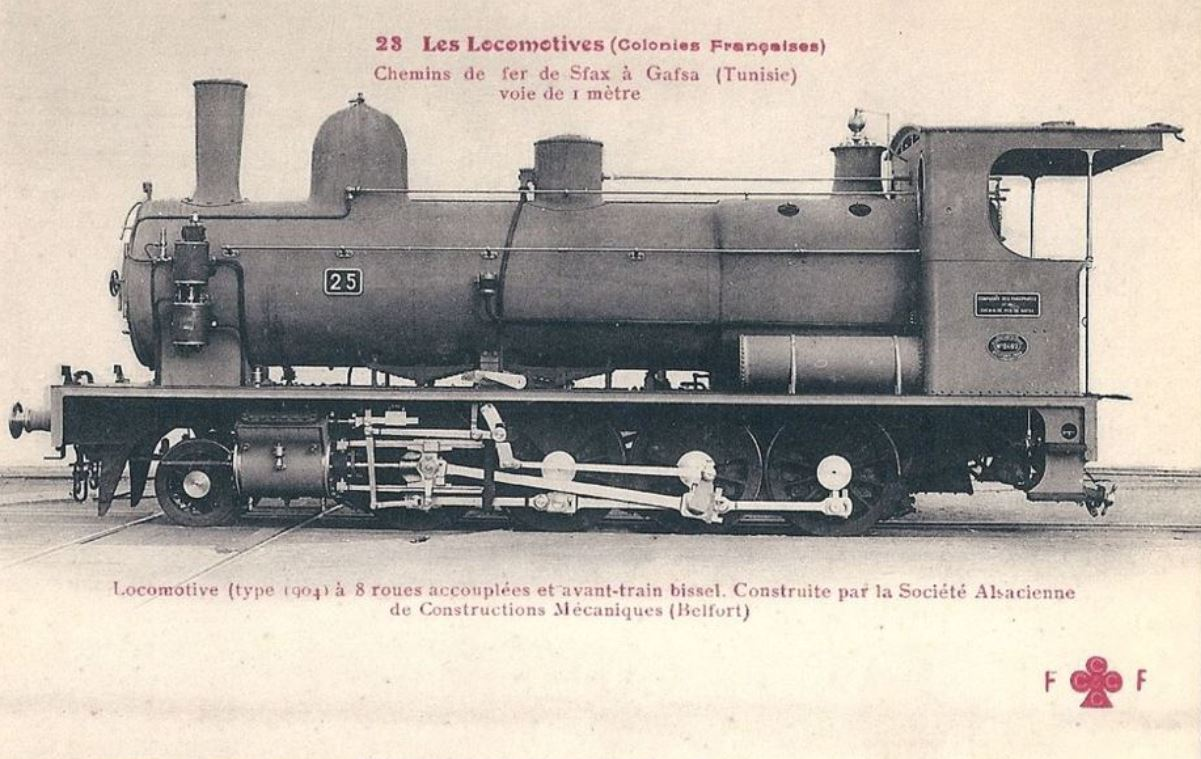
One of the company's locomotives in 1904, built by the Société Alsacienne de Constructions Mécaniques

The first underground mine was opened in the Metlaoui region in 1899. By 1900 annual production of commercial phosphate had reached 200,000 tons. The second mine at Redéyef was opened in 1903 and the third at Moulares in 1904. STEPHOS (Société Tunisienne d’Exploitation Phosphatier) was created in 1905. In 1906 the company had a capital of 18 million francs. Charles Dollfus-Galline was président and baron Robert de Nervo (1842–1909) was vice-président. The M’dhilla mine was opened in 1920 by the Compagnie des Phosphates Tunisien.

In the early 20th century the plentiful phosphate reserves in Tunisia were second only to those of the United States, and the colonial officials were hopeful that they would revive the economy. Although annual production reached 2 million tons in the early 1930s, the world price of phosphates dropped soon after exports from Tunisia started, and the forecast earnings were never realized. However, the Compagnie des Phosphates et Chemins de Fer de Gafsa became the largest employer and taxpayer in the French protectorate of Tunisia. The Société Filiale Industriel d’Acide Phosphorique et d’Engrais (SIAPE) began operation in 1948.

== Post-independence (1956–2011) ==
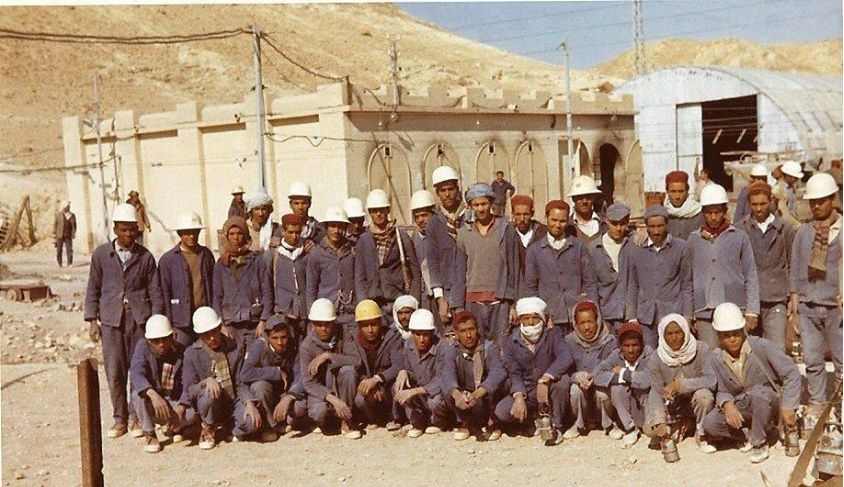
Team of workers of the Compagnie des Phosphates de Gafsa in 1969

After independence, in 1956 the different subsidiaries of the CPGCFG were progressively nationalized. In 1962 the Compagnie des Phosphates Tunisien de M’dhilla became entirely Tunisian-owned. In 1969 the Compagnie des Phosphates Tunisien de M’dhilla merged with the CPGCFG. In 1976 the STEPHOS and CPGCFG merged under the name of CPG, entirely owned by the Tunisian government. The first open pit mine began operation in Kef Schfaier in 1978. That year the research center was created. In the early 1990s with World Bank support the company mechanized its operations and concentrated on open pit operations.

In 1994 the CTG merged with the Groupe Chimique Tunisien (GCT), based in Tunis, a public company that converts phosphate into products such as phosphoric acid and fertilizers. The Tunisian Chemical Group (GCT) is the result of the merger of five phosphate processing companies, namely the Société Industrielle d'Acide Phosphorique et d'Engrais à Sfax, the Industries Chimiques Maghrébines à Gabès, the Société Arabe des Engrais Phosphatés et Azotés à Gabès, the Engrais de Gabès and the Industrie Chimique de Gafsa. A single general director was named for the CPG and its sister company the GCT. In 1996 CPG and GCT merged their management structure. Mohamed Fadhel Khalil (died 2017), former Minister of Social Affairs (1992–96), was chief executive officer of the company.

The last underground mine, Redeyef, closed in 2006. The CPG is the only large employer in Gafsa. In January 2008 the company announced that it was cutting local employees from 11,000 to 5,000. The local branch of the workers' union was occupied by a group of well-educated young people, and tents were pitched on the train tracks leading from the phosphate mines. The protesters were joined by unemployed people, their relatives, trade unionists and even some CPG staff. The police blocked the roads and opened fire on the demonstrators. The government imposed a strict censorship on reporting about the events in the Tunisian media, although some news appeared in the international press. These events were a precursor to the revolution of 2010–11.

In 2006 a partnership was agreed to form Tunisian Indian Fertilizers (TIFERT) as a joint venture owned 70% by CPG-GCT and 30% by two Indian companies, with the purpose of manufacturing phosphate fertilizers, mainly for export. The two Indian companies, each with 15%, were Coromandel International and Gujarat State Fertilizers and Chemicals. The partnership entered into force in 2011. In 2008 Tunisia produced over 1 million tons of phosphoric acid, 863 tons of triple super phosphate (TSP) and 1 million tons of diammonium phosphate (DAP). By 2010 the company was the fifth largest phosphate producer in the world. That year the company produced 8 million tons of phosphate and accounted for 10% of Tunisian exports and 4% of the Tunisian GDP.

== Post-Tunisian Revolution (2011–present) ==
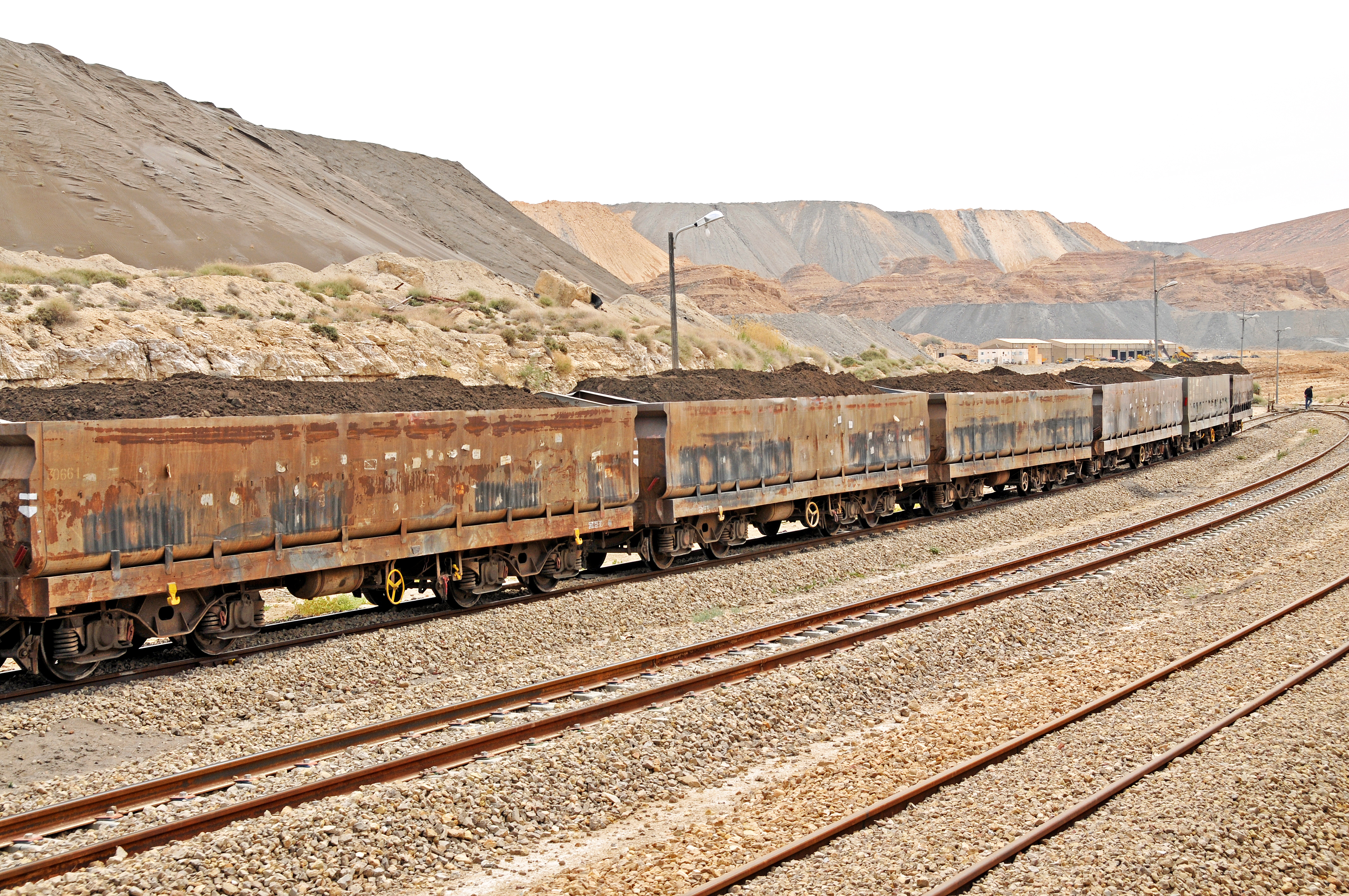
Train loaded with phosphate rock; mine dumps and workings in background. Metlaoui 2012

After the fall of the Ben Ali regime in January 2011 the company ran into difficulties meeting social demands. Starting in January 2011 strikes and protest movements organized by the Tunisian General Labour Union (UGTT) caused a 40% decline in production and loss of international markets, particularly in India. The company also faced competition from expanded phosphate production in Morocco and new producers in Saudi Arabia and Peru, coupled with declining demand in India and China. The governments made concessions such as cancelling outsourcing and bringing employees of suppliers into the CPG. This raised the workforce from 8,000 employees to 30,000 between 2010 and 2014. At the same time, sit-ins by the unemployed of the region handicapped operations. In May 2015 the managers and agents of the company suspended administrative and social activities, stopped payments and closed the head office.

A 2016 report noted that the two companies of the CPG-GCT group had a shared management structure, and were releasing little information to the public. The CPG had never published its financial statements, despite being required to do so by law. The 1953 mining decree and the mining code do not require publication of details of research and extraction contracts. There was a lack of public information on the composition and functions of the board of directors and associated committees, and information on the work and reports of internal and external auditors was very limited. There was also a lack of transparency about the management and governance practices of subsidiaries.

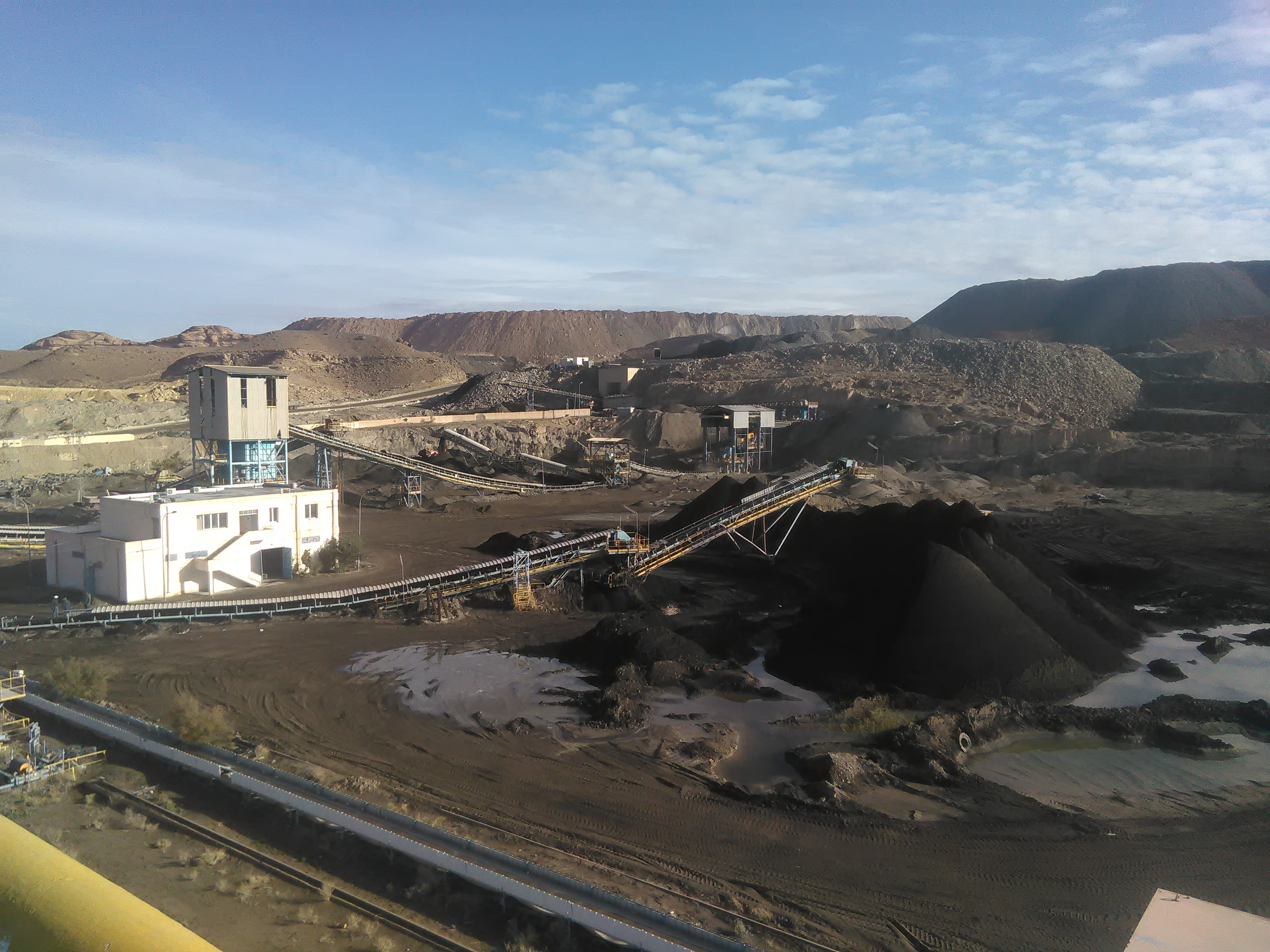
Kef Eddour phosphates washing factory in 2016

== Facilities ==
As of 2016 the company produced filtered and dried phosphate for the market. The Gafsa phosphate basin in the southeast of Tunisia on the Algerian border had mining, quarrying and enrichment units. There were seven open pit mines, one underground mine, and seven washing facilities. There were five mining sectors:

- Métlaoui Kef Schfaier includes the Kef Shfaier quarry and the Metlaoui washing facilities
- Métlaoui Kef Eddour includes the Kef Eddour quarry and washing facility
- Redeyef includes the Erg-Lasfar mine and the Redeyef quarry and washing facility
- Moulares includes the Mrata mine and the Moularès quarry and washing facility
- M'dhilla includes the Jellabia and Mzinda quarries and the M'dhilla washing facilities

The company also has licenses in Chott El Jerid in the north and Meknassy in the south of Tunisia.

== Sources ==
- Boubaker, Sabri; Hassen, Majdi (2016), La Compagnie des Phosphates de Gafsa (CPG) : État des lieux de la gouvernance et recommandations (PDF) (in French), National Resource Governance Institute
- "Cie des Phosphates et Chemins de Fer de Gafsa (Tunisie)" (PDF), Entreprise Coloniales (in French)
- CPG/Historique (in French), CPG, archived from the original on 2017-08-06
- Dahmani, Frida (7 May 2015), "Tunisie : la Compagnie des phosphates de Gafsa baisse le rideau", Jeune Afrique (in French)
- Gana, Nouri (2013-09-30), The Making of the Tunisian Revolution: Contexts, Architects, Prospects, Edinburgh University Press, ISBN 978-0-7486-9105-0
- Geological Survey (U S ) (2017-02-22), Minerals Yearbook, 2013, Area Reports, International: Africa and the Middle East, Government Printing Office, ISBN 978-1-4113-4069-5
- K.H. (31 May 2017), "Décès de l'ancien ministre Mohamed Fadhel Khalil", Business News (in French)
- Oxford Business Group (2010), The Report: Tunisia 2010, Oxford Business Group, ISBN 978-1-907065-18-7
- Perkins, Kenneth (2014-01-20), A History of Modern Tunisia, Cambridge University Press, ISBN 978-1-107-02407-6
- Perkins, Kenneth J. (2016-10-12), Historical Dictionary of Tunisia, Rowman & Littlefield Publishers, ISBN 978-1-4422-7318-4
