= Métlaoui =

Métlaoui متلوي
- Commune and town
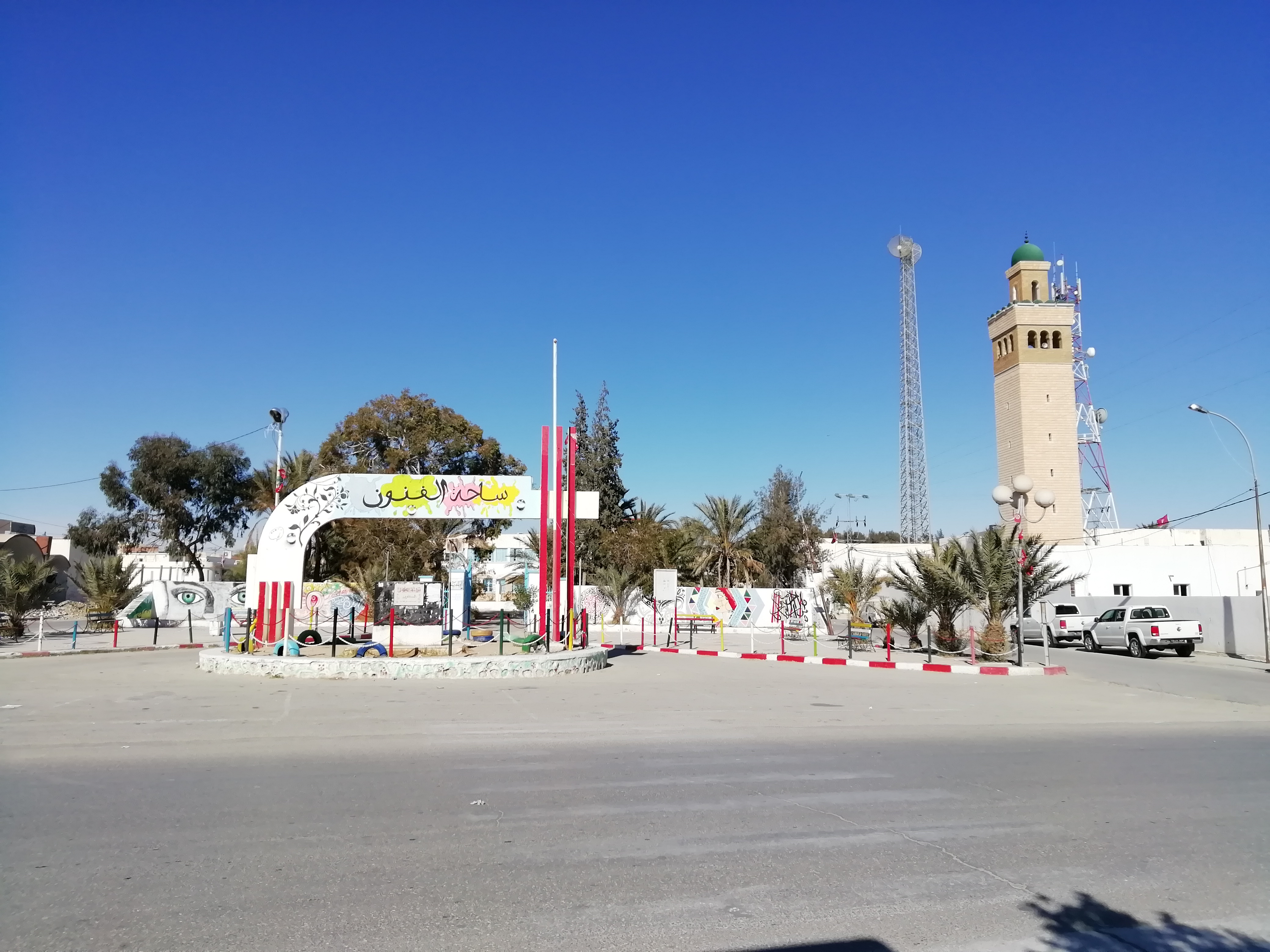

- Location within Tunisia
- Coordinates: 34.33°N 8.41°E
- Country: Tunisia
- Governorate: Gafsa Governorate

Population (2024)
  - Total: 39,021
- Time zone: UTC+1 (CET)

Métlaoui (Tunisian Arabic: متلوي mitlawī) is a town and commune in the Gafsa Governorate, Tunisia. In 2014 it had a population of 39,100.

== History ==
The history of Métlaoui dates back to Prehistoric times. To the west of the town, in the agricultural area of Sagdoud, traces of prehistoric activity can be found, particularly numerous megaliths. Sites such as Bir El Hmara, Bir El Hmairia, and Gourbata also bear evidence of the Capsian culture.

Punic ruins are present in the form of forts built for security purposes on the mountain peaks. Within the Selja Gorges, there are Roman ruins, especially at El Mkhifia, as well as defensive walls. In fact, the Roman limes passed from Chebika to the south of Métlaoui.

During the medieval period, the arrival of the Arabs saw the Hamama settle in what is now the Sidi Bouzid plain, while the Ouled Bouyahia and Jeridia settled in the area of present-day Métlaoui.

When the French arrived in the region, they encountered a population engaged in agriculture and pastoralism. The town experienced significant growth during the French Protectorate, particularly after the 1885 discovery of phosphate deposits a few kilometers away, at the foot of Djebel Selja, by Philippe Thomas. Industrial exploitation began in 1896 with the granting of a railway concession to the Compagnie des Phosphates et des Chemins de Fer de Gafsa, which built a 250-kilometer railway line between Métlaoui and Sfax to transport the ore for export or local processing.

To this day, phosphate continues to be extracted from eight nearby mining centers, with Métlaoui serving as the main hub. Most of the facilities of the Compagnie des phosphates de Gafsa are located in Métlaoui, including departments for production, maintenance, research, supply, and other units directly involved in mining operations.

== Infrastructure ==

Métlaoui is an important railway hub of southern Tunisia, as it lies near the Sousse-Tozeur line. The branch to Redeyef (with interconnection to Kasserine) splits nearby. This line is famous because is runs through scenic selja gorges.

Until the 2011 Jasmine Revolution, Métlaoui was home to a Natural History Museum filled with fossil specimens discovered during mining operations. In 2019, the fossil remains were re-excavated from the ruins and sent to the University of Gafsa for storage.

== See also ==
- List of cities in Tunisia
