= Jérissa =

Jérissa الجريصة
- Commune and town
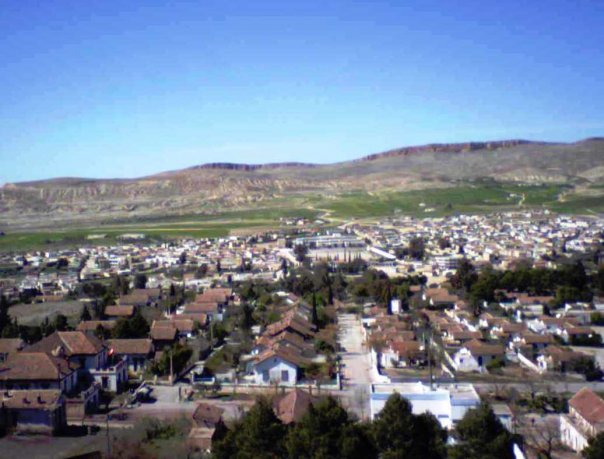

- Location within Tunisia
- Coordinates: 35°51′N 8°38′E
- Country: Tunisia
- Governorate: Kef Governorate

Government
  - Mayor: Lamine Salmani (Nidaa Tounes)

Population (2014)
  - Total: 9,807
- Time zone: UTC+1 (CET)

Jérissa, also spelled Djérissa, is a town and commune in the Kef Governorate, Tunisia. As of 2004 it had a population of 11,298. It is located 51.7 kilometres (32.1 mi) by road east of the Algerian town of Ouenza.

== History ==
The area has been inhabited since antiquity. The name Djerissa is of Amazigh origin and means "hill". Many archaeological sites, including Amazigh, Punic, and Roman can be found in the area.

During the Arab rule, the locality was called Majjenna (Arabic: مجانة) and Henchir el-Hadid (Arabic: هنشير الحديد; meaning: ancient enclosure of iron). Arab geographer al-Ya'qubi, in the 9th century, mentioned it as Majjenna, the name it had at the time, and described the mines in the town. Yaqut al-Hamawi, described a nearby citadel: Citadel of Busr, named after military commander Busr ibn Abi Artat, who conquered the region in the 7th century, under the command of Caliphate Mu'awiya I. The name Citadel of Busr was also used for the whole region of Djerissa.

The exploitation of iron in Tunisia is documented back to the Carthaginian era and was developed further under the Romans. Traditional settlement in the region, scattered around a few agricultural plots and many grazing lands, suddenly transformed in 1887 with the recent discovery of the purity of iron ore in the region (with an iron concentration of over 55%). The mine became operational in 1890, under the control of the Algerian Credit and Banking Company (representing the Banque de l'Union Parisienne). A railway and a town to house the mine workers and their families were built at the foot of Mount Lakehal (Black Mountain). In 1905, the first office for the mine’s management was built, housing the general director, who gave his name to the building. A couple of years later, the management building of the Société du Djebel-Djérissa was constructed at the center of a square, with all the city's streets converging toward it.

During World War I, the mines of Djerissa shipped 353,945 tons of ore in 1916, much of it used by English forges to produce war munitions. In the years leading up to World War II, production averaged between 600,000 and 700,000 tons per year. In 1937, production peaked at 718,000 tons, and 647,551 tons were extracted in 1938. Early in the war, the storage and embarkation facilities at La Goulette were heavily damaged, and wrecks near the wharf made it inaccessible to large vessels. However, production increased later in the war and in the postwar years as the facilities were repaired. Output figures were 29,703 tons in 1943, 88,863 tons in 1944, 152,450 tons in 1945, 183,705 tons in 1946, and 403,691 tons in 1947.

During World War II, Djerissa was one of the headquarters of the Allied corps, headed by French commander General Louis Koeltz.

In addition to the local labor force, the miners and staff recruited were mainly poor European populations (French, with Corsicans considered separately, Italians, Spaniards, and Maltese) as well as Maghrebis (Algerians, Moroccans, and Libyans). The company built the town with a village center around the Villa Morin, which included a post office, a dispensary, a pharmacy, a general store, a canteen, and the Catholic Church of Sainte-Barbe. Collective housing for the miners (known as corons, which became quiroun in Tunisian Arabic) was segregated by the workers' origin (Europeans, Sicilians, Arabs-Moroccans, and Kabyles), while villas with gardens surrounded by plant fences (modeled after garden cities) were provided for the engineers.

The town expanded in the 1950s (Hached district), to the north of the engineers' neighborhood, with the construction of small houses. This was followed by urbanization without any land-use planning (for example, the development of the Ali Ben Khalifa neighborhood from 1956 to 1975) and the formation of spontaneous housing on the outskirts of the colonial town, caused by rural migration following independence.

As of 2005, the town annual production was 120,000 tons of iron ore, accounted 60 percent of Tunisia's production.

== Culture ==
The festival of Sidi Yahia Jerissa is an annual event.

== Sport ==
The Jerissa Football Club is a local football team.

== Notable people ==
- Taoufik Ben Brik, journalist and writer
- Mourad Melki, association football player
- Ayoub Massoudi, former advisor of president Moncef Marzouki

== Population ==
2014 Census (Municipal)
Homes	Families	Males	Females	Total
3389	2877	4817	4990	9807

== See also ==
- List of cities in Tunisia
