= Tamera, Tunisia =

Coordinates: 37.058169°N 9.122127°E

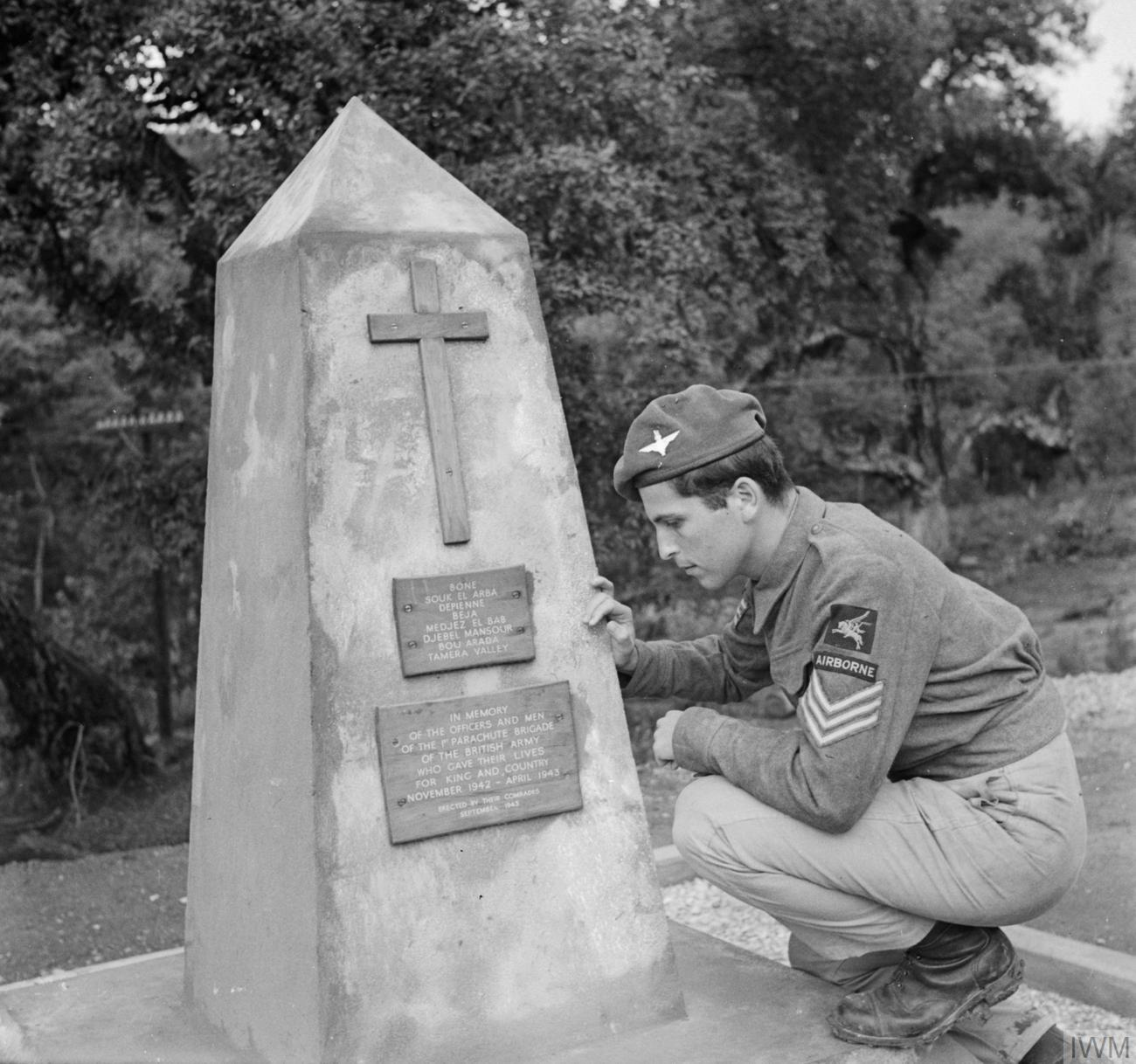
Soldier of the 2nd Parachute Battalion examines a memorial to the 1st Parachute Brigade in the Tamara Valley, 14 October 1943

Tamera is a location, and valley in northern Tunisia.

During the Roman Empire, Tagarbala, was a civitas of the Roman province of Byzacena during late antiquity. The Roman town is identifiable with ruins at Bordj-Tamra.

The town saw British airborne operations in North Africa during World War II.

There is a railway station there.
