= Chebika, Tozeur =

Oasis in Tunisia

Coordinates: 34°19′N 7°56′E

Chebika (الشبيكة) is a mountain oasis and associated village in western Tunisia, in Tozeur Governorate.

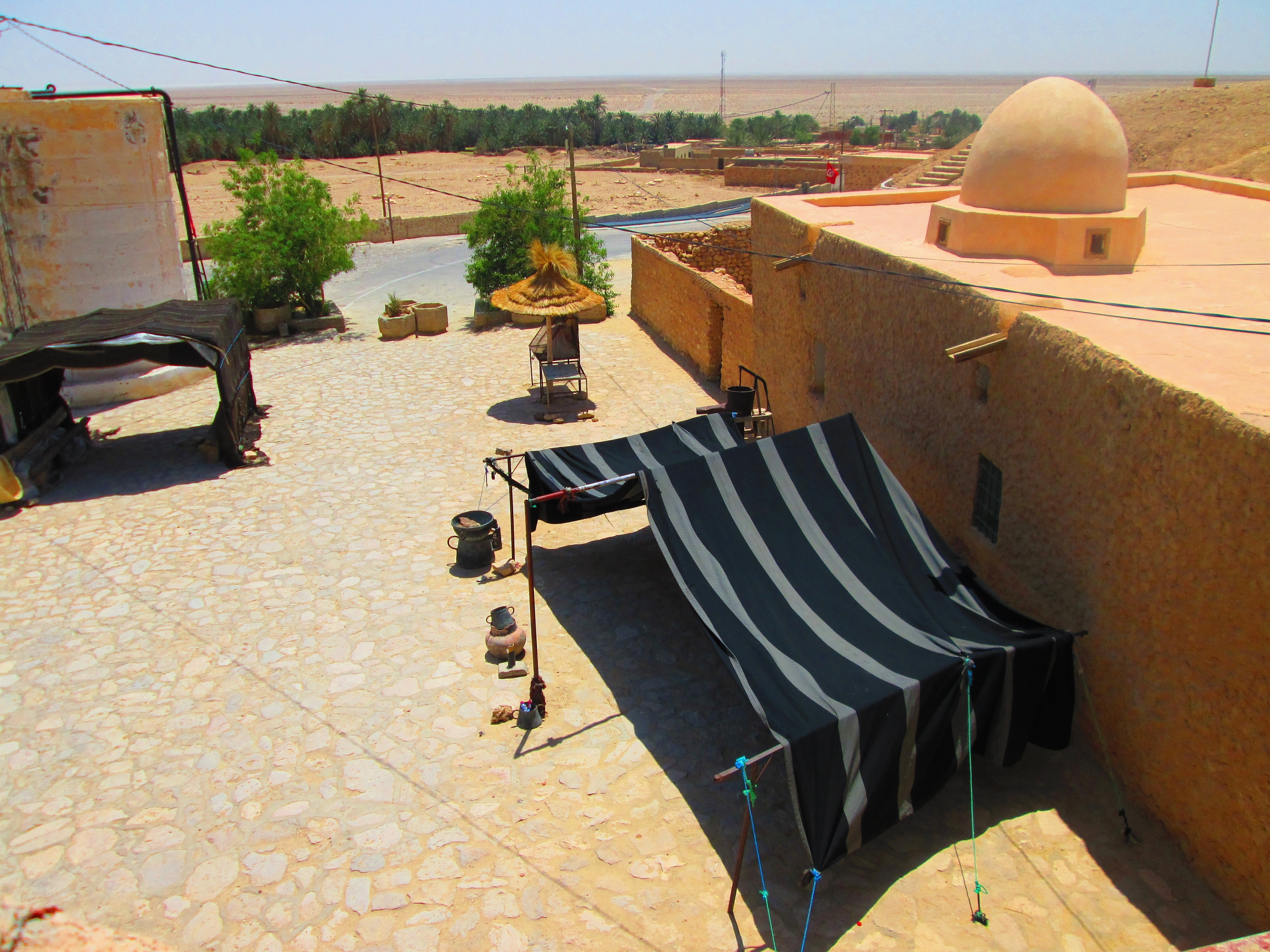
A courtyard at Chebika

== Geography ==
Chebika lies at the foot of the mountains of the Djebel en Negueb and, because of its exposure to the sun, it is known as قصر الشمس Qasr el-Shams ("Palace of the Sun" in Arabic). As the crow flies, it is approximately 8km from the border with Algeria.

== Oasis ==
A spring arises to the NorthEast of the village in the mountains, from which the water passes through waterfalls and pools before reaching the level of the village, providing irrigation to an extensive area of trees and vegetation.

== History ==
In antiquity, it was a Roman outpost known as Ad Speculum and later a mountain refuge of the Berber people. Ad Speculum was civitas of the Roman Province of Africa between 30 BC and 640 AD. Located on the Saharan limes just north of Ad Turres, it was a station on the road linking Tébessa and Gafsa.

The modern village of Chebika has several hundred residents. It was built near the old town, which was abandoned in 1969 after catastrophic flooding in which more than 400 people died. The site, writes Jean Duvignaud, "is located at the intersection of two projections of the mountain which opens here towards the desert". The urban framework consists of a grid plan intersecting at the market place.

Many scenes for the film The English Patient were shot in the Chebika oasis landscape.

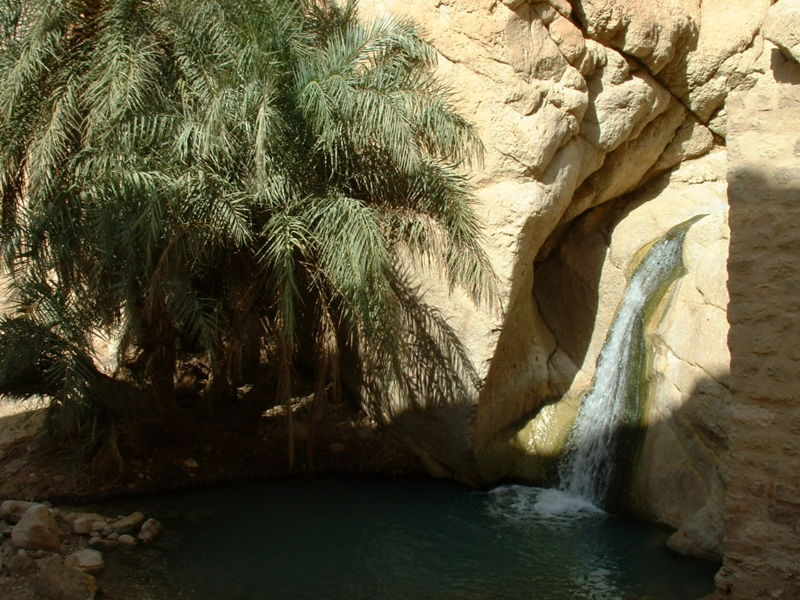
Chebika Waterfall

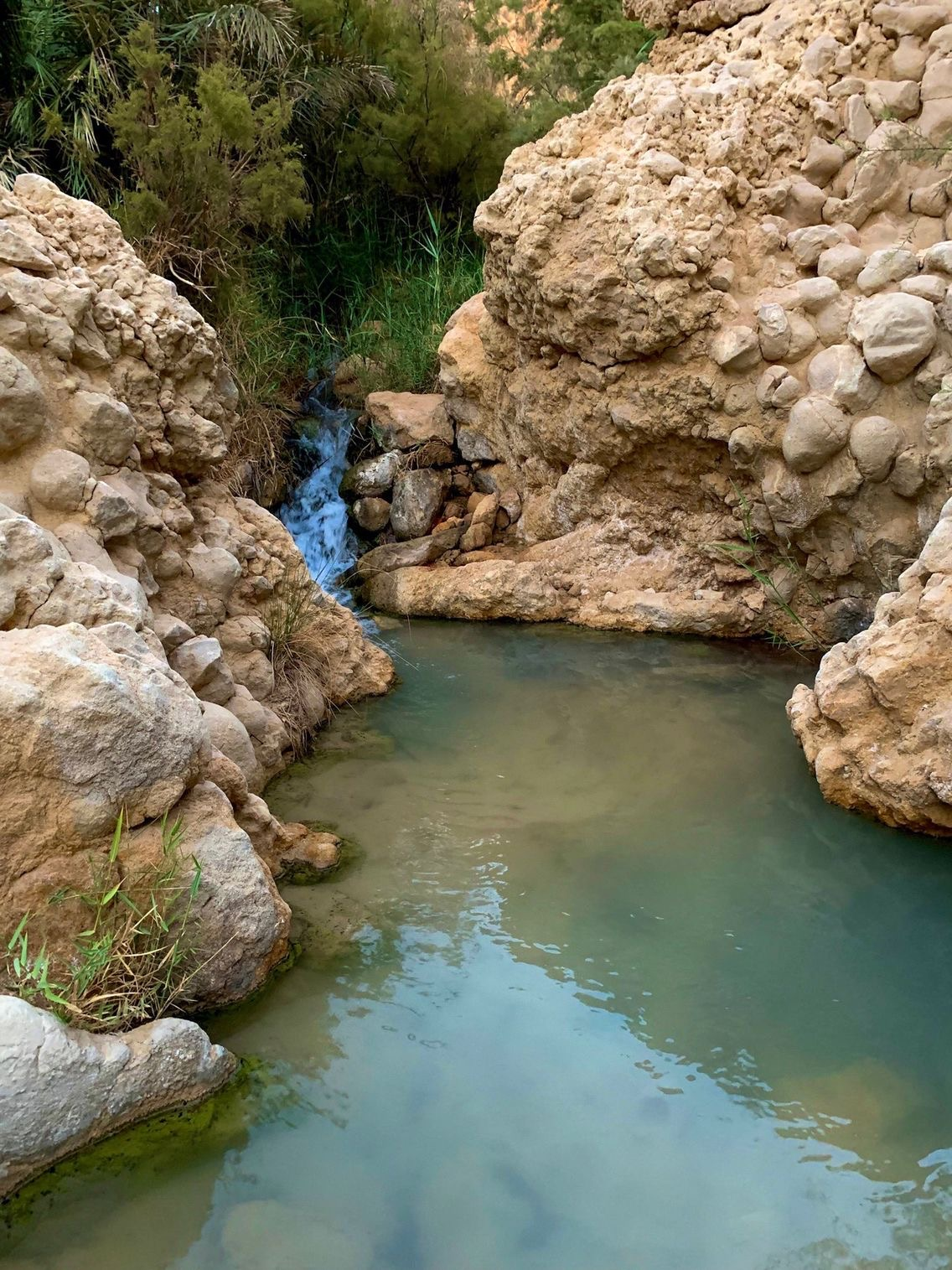
Valley in Chebika Oasis

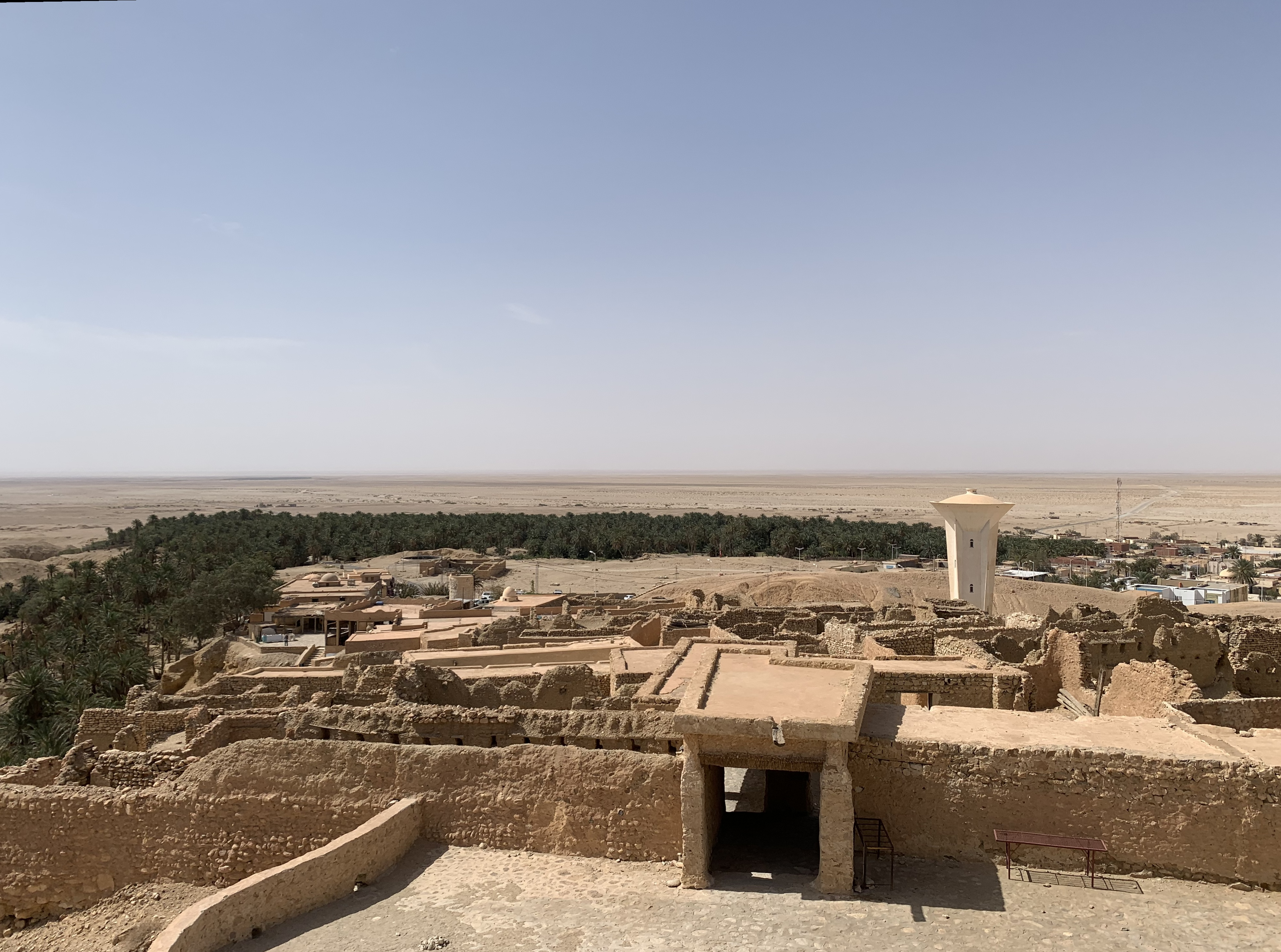
View of Chebika Oasis

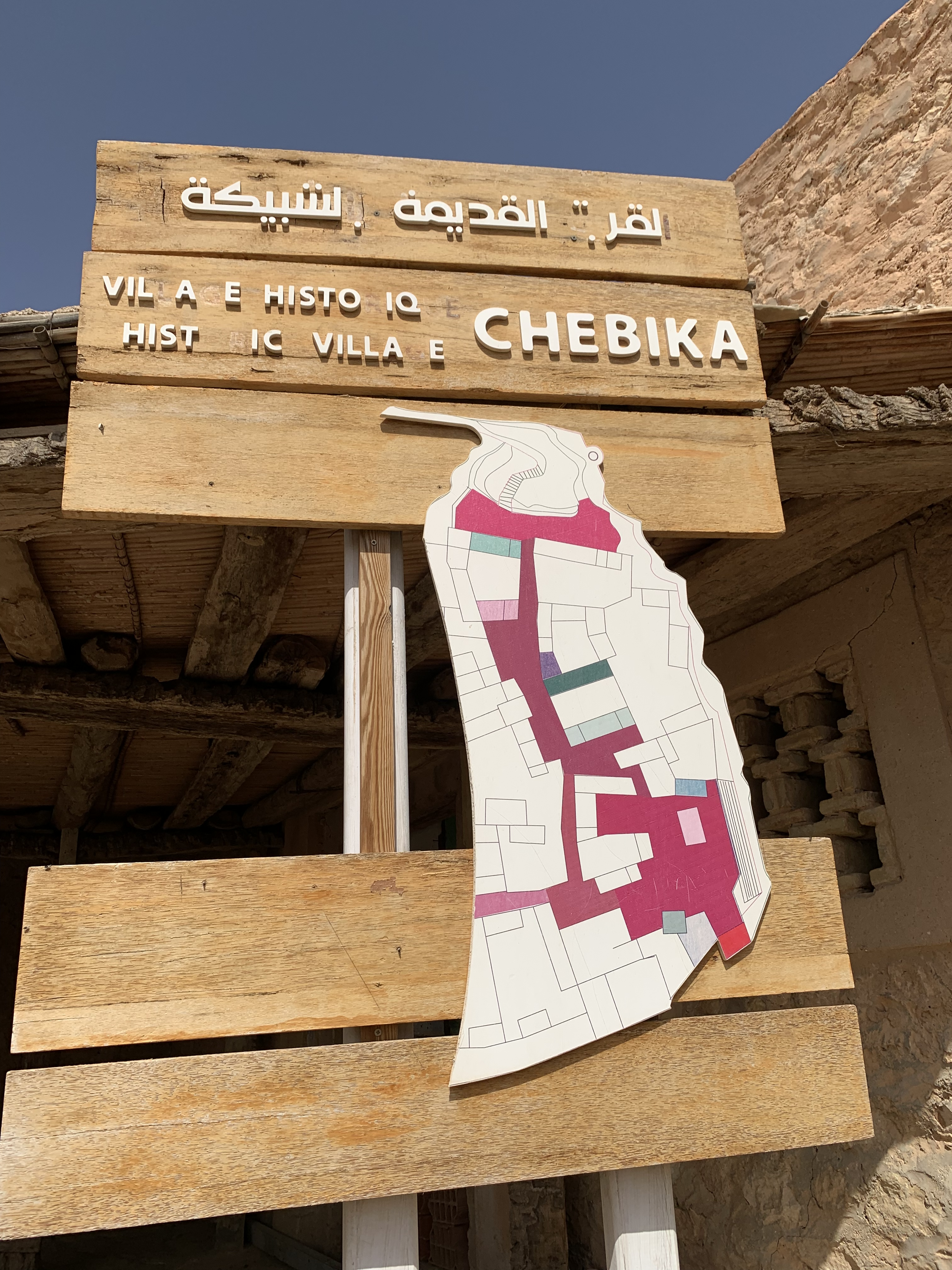
Historic Village of Chebika

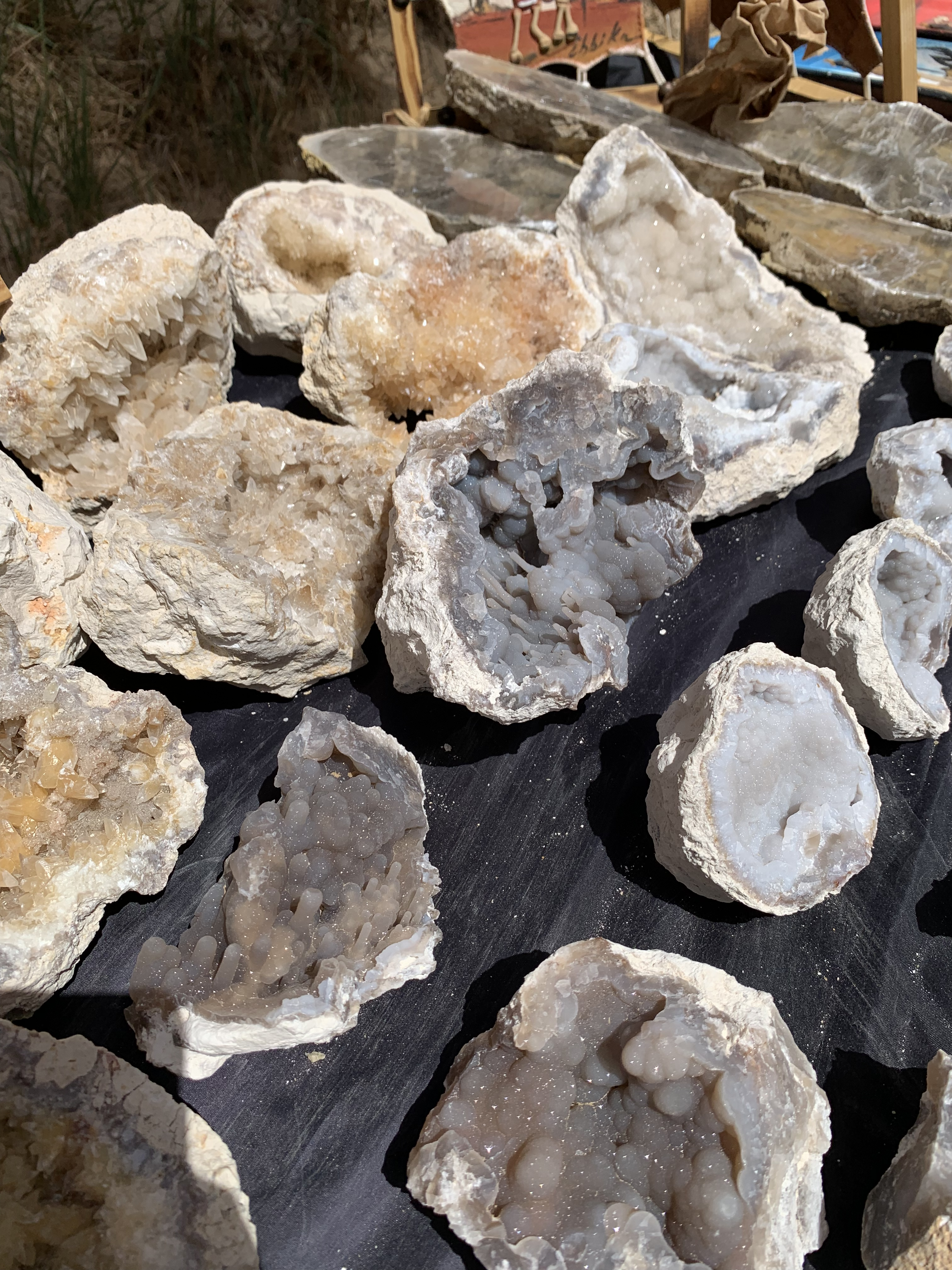
Natural Mineral Geodes in Chebika

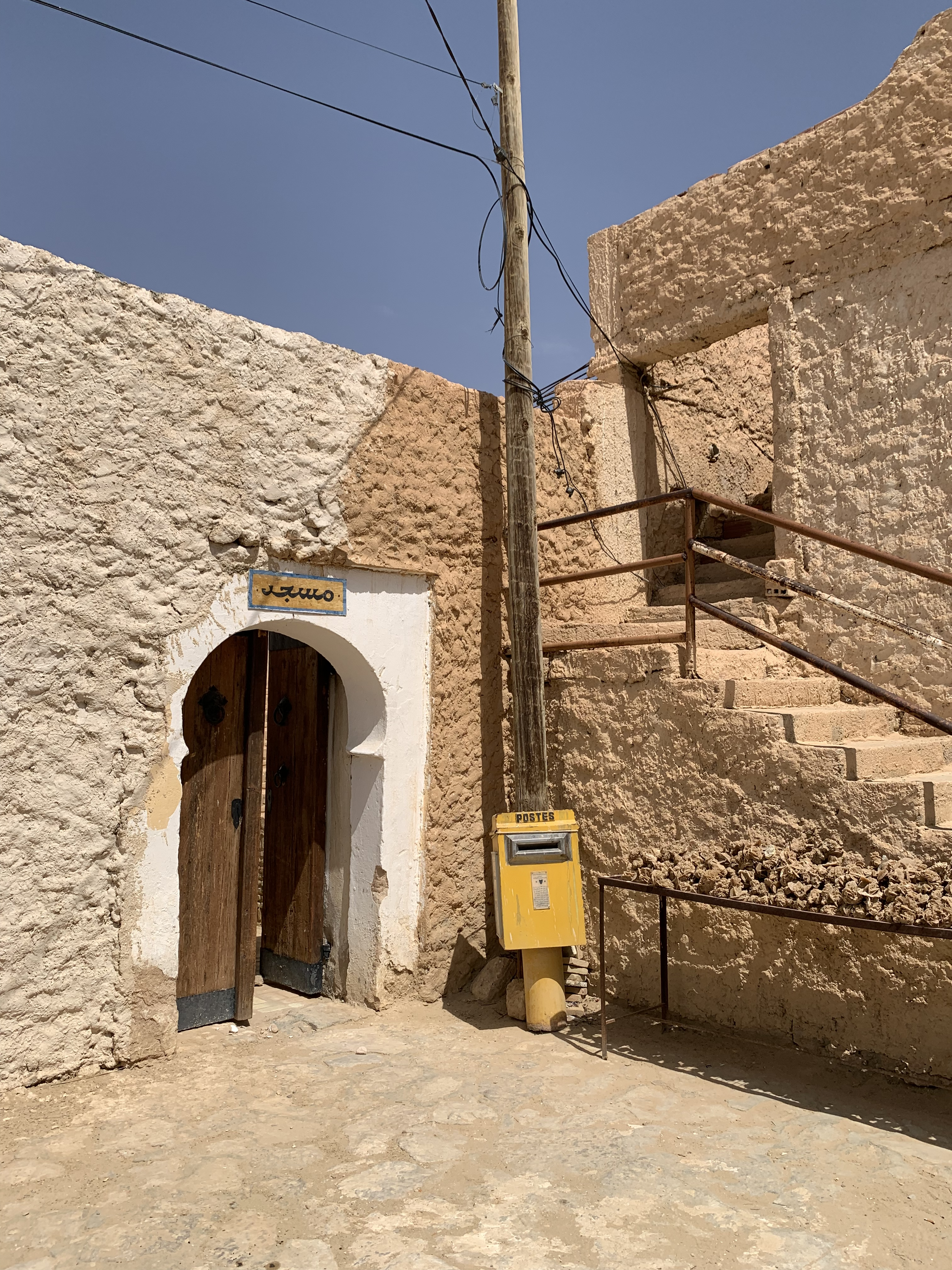
Ibadi Mosque in the old village of Chebika

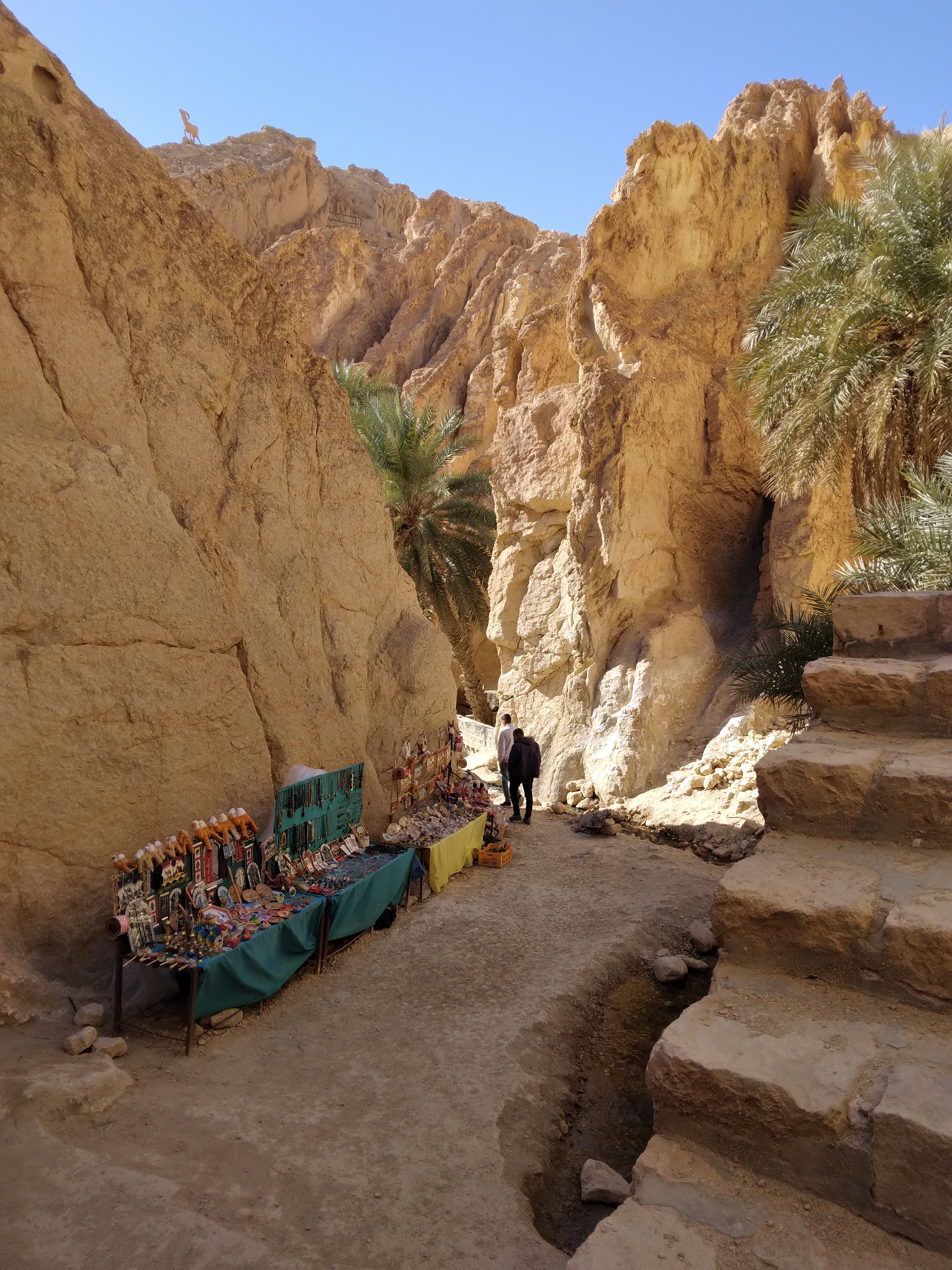
Looking from within Chebika oasis towards the entrance

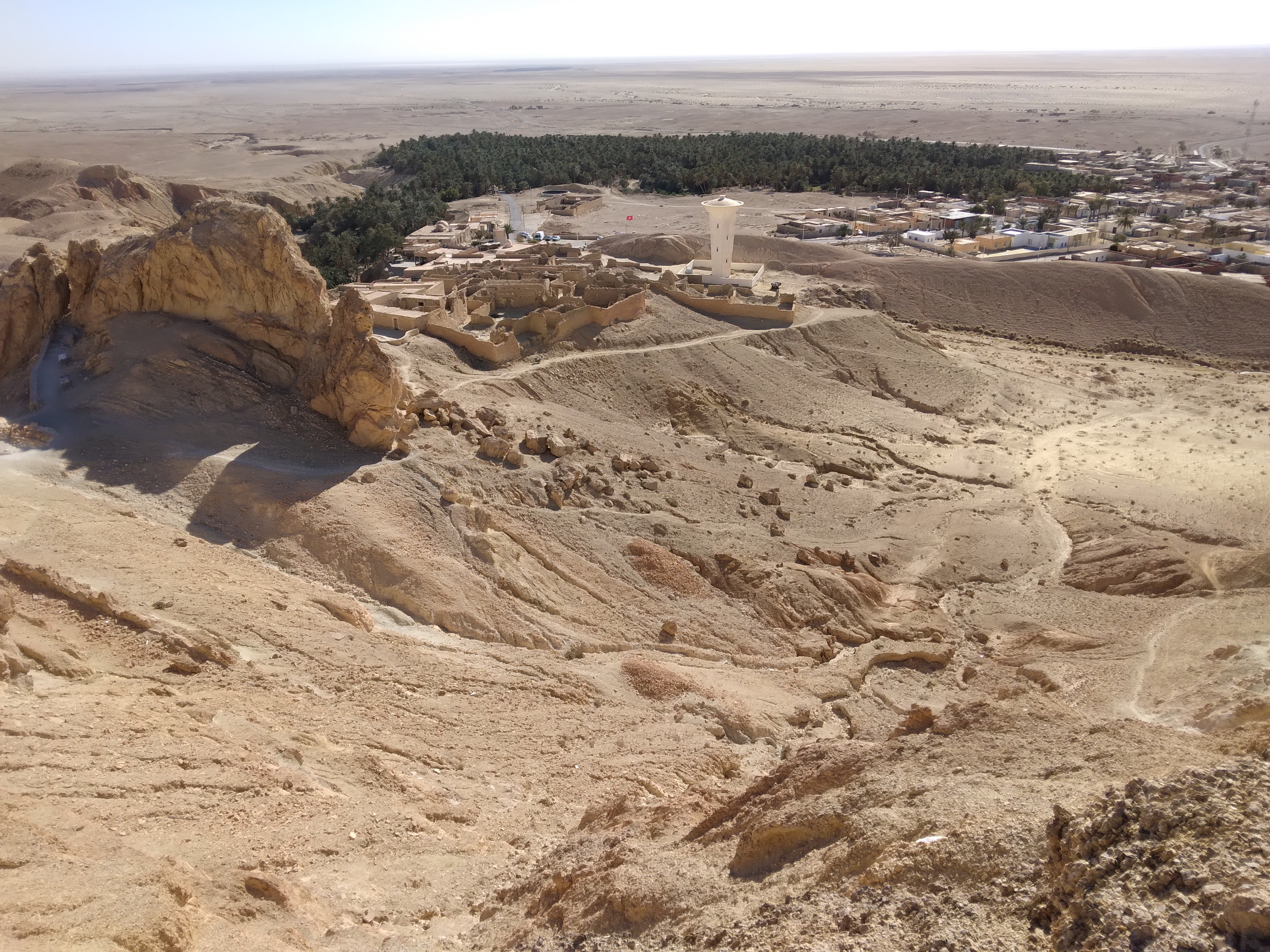
Looking down on the village of Chebika
