= Redeyef =

Redeyef الرّدَيِّف
- Commune and town
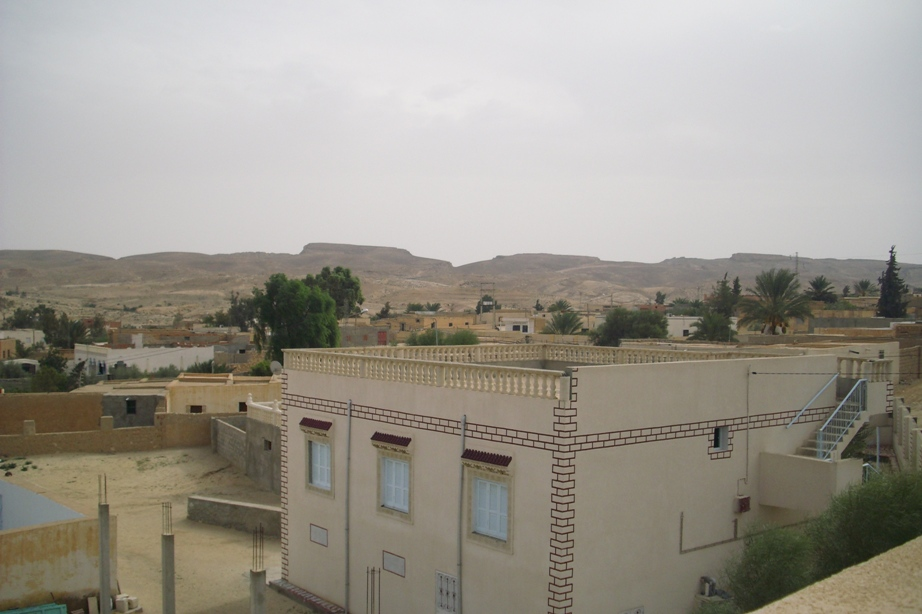

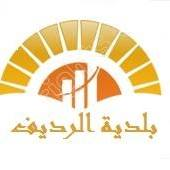
- Coat of arms

- Location within Tunisia
- Coordinates: 34.38°N 8.15°E
- Country: Tunisia
- Governorate: Gafsa Governorate

Government
  - Mayor: Ahmed Tababi (Popular Front)

Population (2014)
  - Total: 26,976
- Time zone: UTC+1 (CET)

Redeyef (Arabic: الرّدَيِّف Ar Rudayyif) is a town and commune in the Gafsa Governorate, Tunisia. As of 2004 it had a population of 26,143. City industry is mainly based on mining.

== Infrastructure ==

Redeyef is Terminus of railway line Métlaoui-Redeyef. This line, used for transportation phosphates from mines, is famous because is runs through scenic selja gorges.

== See also ==
- List of cities in Tunisia

== Population ==
2014 Census (Municipal)
Homes	Families	Males	Females	Total
6029	5603	12245	12801	25046
