= Friguia Park =

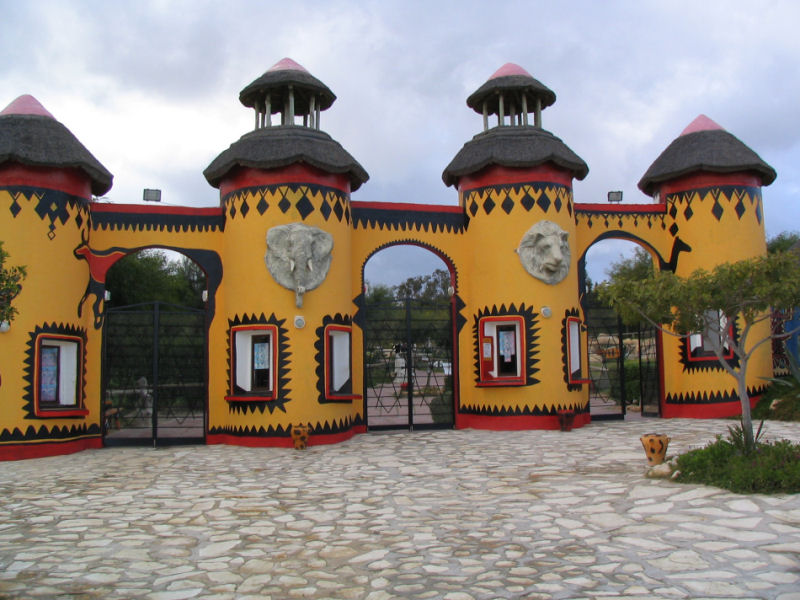
- Interactive map of Friguia Park
- 36°12′16″N 10°25′24″E
- Date opened: November 11, 2000
- Location: Bouficha, Sousse, Tunisia
- Land area: 36 ha
- No. of animals: 400
- No. of species: 62

Friguia Park is a zoological park in Tunisia, located near the town of Bouficha, approximately 70 km south of Tunis and 25 km north of Sousse. The park was inaugurated on November 11, 2000 and covers an area of 36 hectares.

== Description ==
Friguia Park is the first zoo in Tunisia. It is home to around 400 animals representing 62 different species, including mammals, birds, and reptiles.

== Notable species ==
Species in the park include:

- Lion, including white lions
- Tiger
- Elephant
- Giraffe
- Zebra
- Crocodile
- Flamingo
- Various species of monkeys
- Deer
- Cheetah
- Serval

The park also features several endangered species and participates in conservation efforts.

== Attractions ==
- Dolphinarium: Friguia Park included a dolphinarium where dolphins and sea lions performed for visitors. Closed in 2016.
- Educational programs: The park offers environmental education programs for school groups and the public.
- Cultural events: African-style dance and music performances are regularly hosted.

== Conservation ==
Friguia Park is involved in the conservation of endangered species through breeding programs and awareness campaigns. It cooperates with international organizations to promote biodiversity and animal welfare.

== Access ==
The park is easily accessible via the highway between Tunis and Sousse. Facilities include restaurants, picnic areas, and souvenir shops, making it a popular destination for families and tourists.

== See also ==
- Tourism in Tunisia
- List of zoos
