= Sidi Khelifa (Tunisia) =

Village in Tunisia

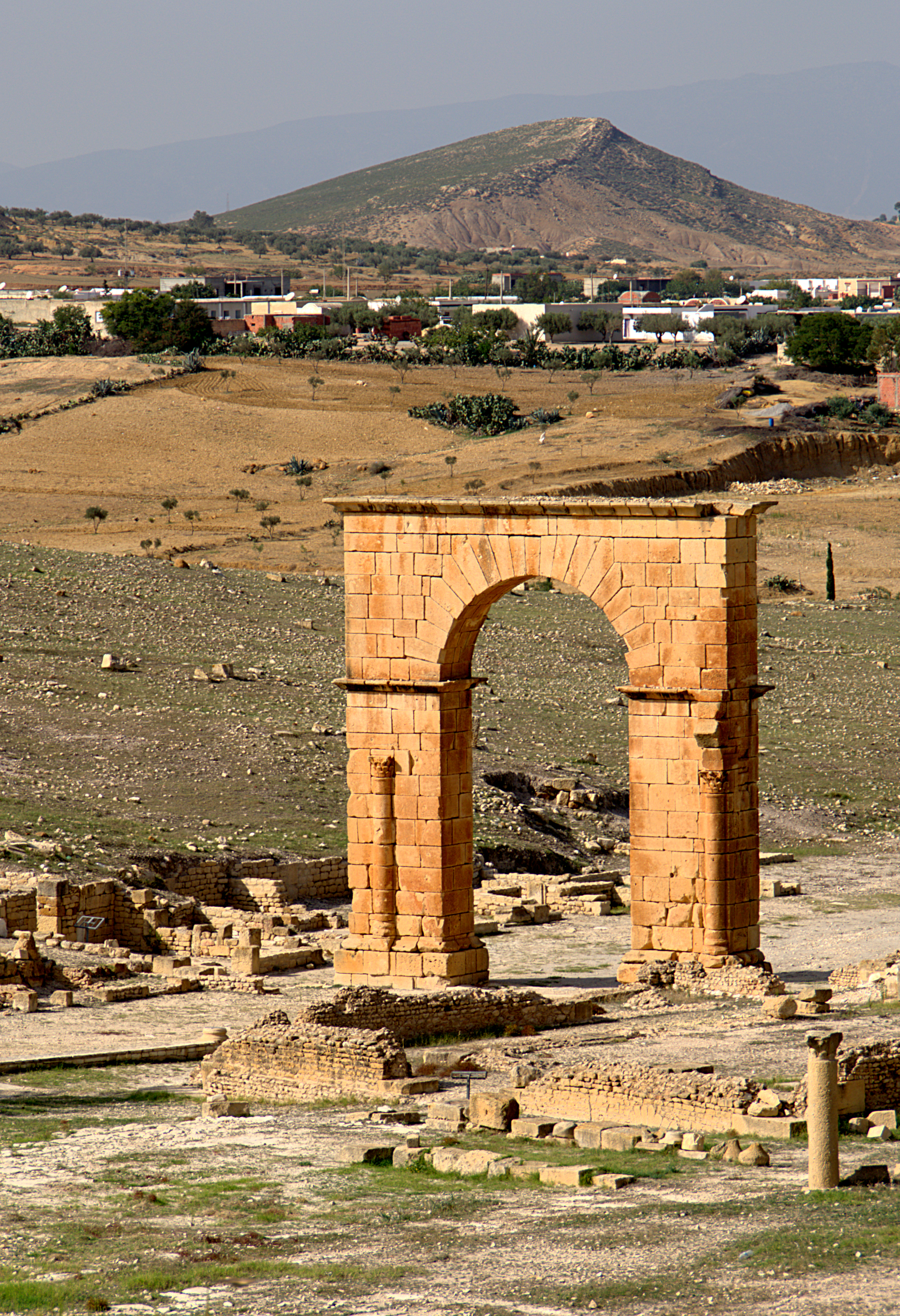
Sidi Khelifa in background

Sidi Khelifa (Arabic: سيدي خليفة) is a Tunisian village located near the town of Bouficha on the Mediterranean coastal plain, about 100 kilometers south of Tunis.

It is part of the delegation of Bouficha attached to the Governorate of Sousse and has a population of 2,536 inhabitants, located around the mausoleum of the patron saint Sidi Khelifa Solâani, who settled there in the late 18th century.

== History ==
It is about a kilometer from an ancient Roman African site, Feradi Maius, whose vestiges discovered in 2003 date from the 2nd century and the 3rd century. In particular, there is the triumphal arch that gives access to the forum lined with commercial premises, a nymphaeum where the water of a spring, a Capitoline temple, thermal baths etc.

At the top of the wooded hill that overlooks the site are the walls of a temple dedicated to Venus and transformed into a Castra (garrison fortress) in Byzantine times. The ancient city was the cathedral see of an ancient Christian Bishopric, which remains a Latin Catholic titular see.
