= Tourism in Tunisia =

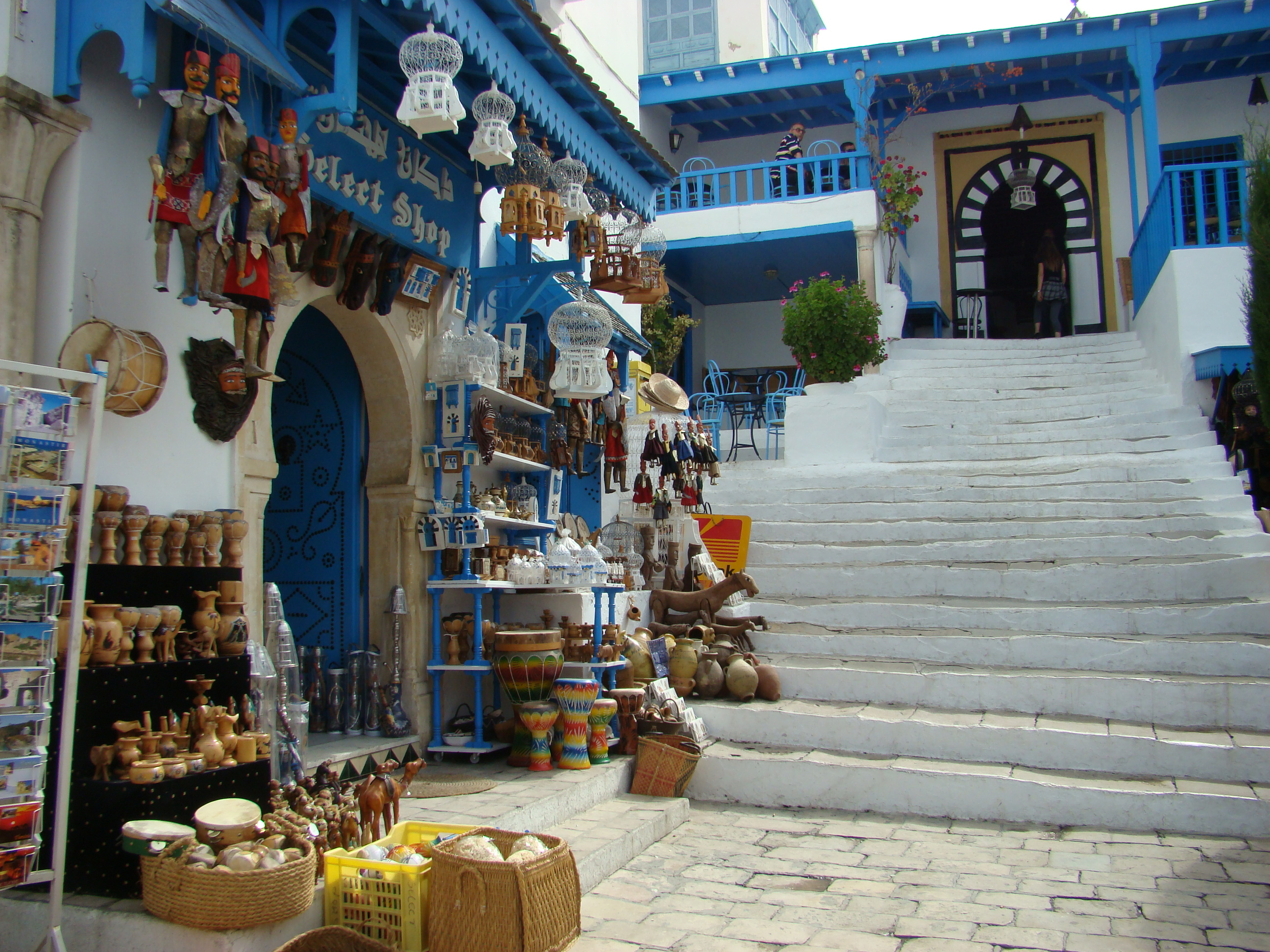
Sidi Bou Saïd, a major tourist destination

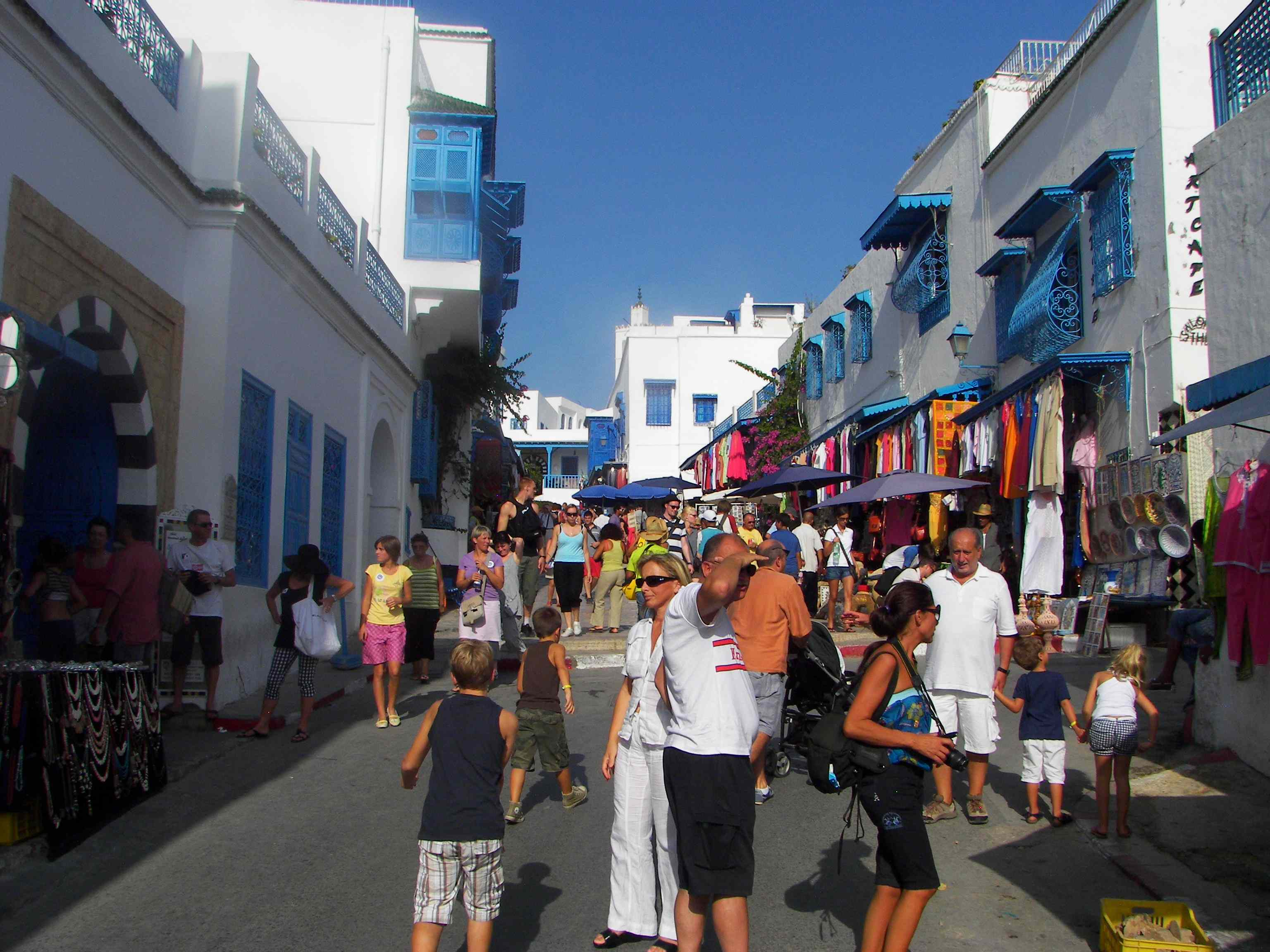
Tourists in Sidi Bou Said, 2009

Tourism in Tunisia is a major industry, attracting around 9.4 million arrivals annually from the year 2016 to 2020, making it one of the most visited countries in Africa.

Among Tunisia's tourist attractions are its cosmopolitan capital city of Tunis, the ancient ruins of Carthage, the Muslim and Jewish quarters of Djerba, and coastal resorts outside Monastir. According to The New York Times, Tunisia is known for its "golden beaches, sunny weather, and affordable luxuries."

== History ==
Garrett Nagle, in his book Advanced Geography, Tunisia's tourist industry "benefits from its Mediterranean location and its tradition of low-cost package holidays from Western Europe." The development of tourism dates back to 1960 through the joint efforts of government and private groups. In 1962, tourism, with 52,000 arrivals and 4,000 beds, generated revenue of two million dollars and became the main source of foreign exchange in the country.

Tunisia hosts every year, but specially during the summer season, a number of music festivals, including the International Festival of Carthage or the Tabarka Jazz Festival.

Up to the turn of the century, Tunisia's main attraction was on its northeast coastline around Tunis; however, the Seventh National Development Plan of 1989 created several new tourist areas including the resort at Port El Kantaoui The tourism sector now represents 6.5% of Tunisia's GDP and provides 340,000 jobs, 85,000 of which are direct, accounting for 11.5% of the working population, with a significant share of seasonal employment.

France, Germany, Italy, and the United Kingdom have been Tunisia's traditional tourist markets. In recent years, Tunisia has expanded its tourism industry to new markets such as Russia and China. From 2003 to 2004, it saw a resurgence in tourist numbers, and in 2007, arrivals increased by 3% compared to 2006.

Tourism in Tunisia suffered severe blows following the Bardo National Museum attack and the Sousse attack in 2015. However, the country quickly recovered its position as a top destination in Africa and the Mediterranean, with 2018 numbers exceeding those of 2010 by 6%, reaching a record 8.3 million visitors.

The COVID-19 pandemic had catastrophic effects on Tunisia's tourism sector, with earnings in 2020 down 60% to US$563 million.

== Attractions ==
Tunisia's attractions are of different types according to the region:

- Tunis, the largest city and capital and its suburbs mainly Le Bardo, and the northern suburbs of Carthage, Sidi Bou Said, La Goulette and La Marsa
- Bizerte and its surroundings
- The North-West for its forests in Ain Draham and picturesque coastal mountains close to Tabarka
- The Cap Bon: Hammamet, Nabeul and surroundings
- The Sahel, Tunisia: the beach resorts of Sousse, Monastir, Mahdia
- The religious city of Kairouan, the former capital of the country, the fourth capital of Islam and the city of the oldest mosque in Africa Great Mosque of Kairouan
- The island of Djerba
- The Sahara and the touristic and relaxing cities of Douz, Tozeur and the famous Tataouine, one of the locations of the Star Wars saga.

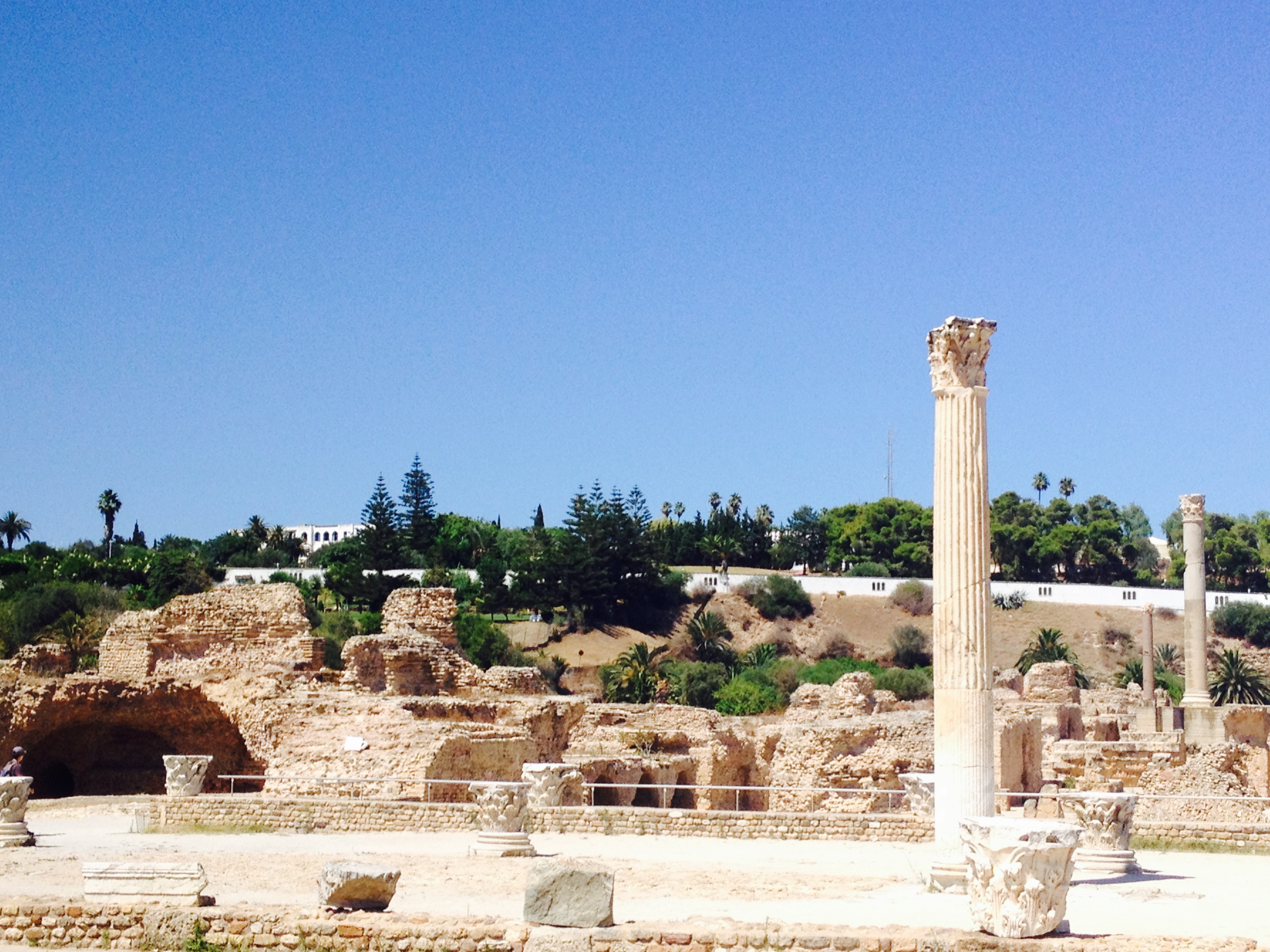
The archeological site of Baths of Antoninus in Carthage

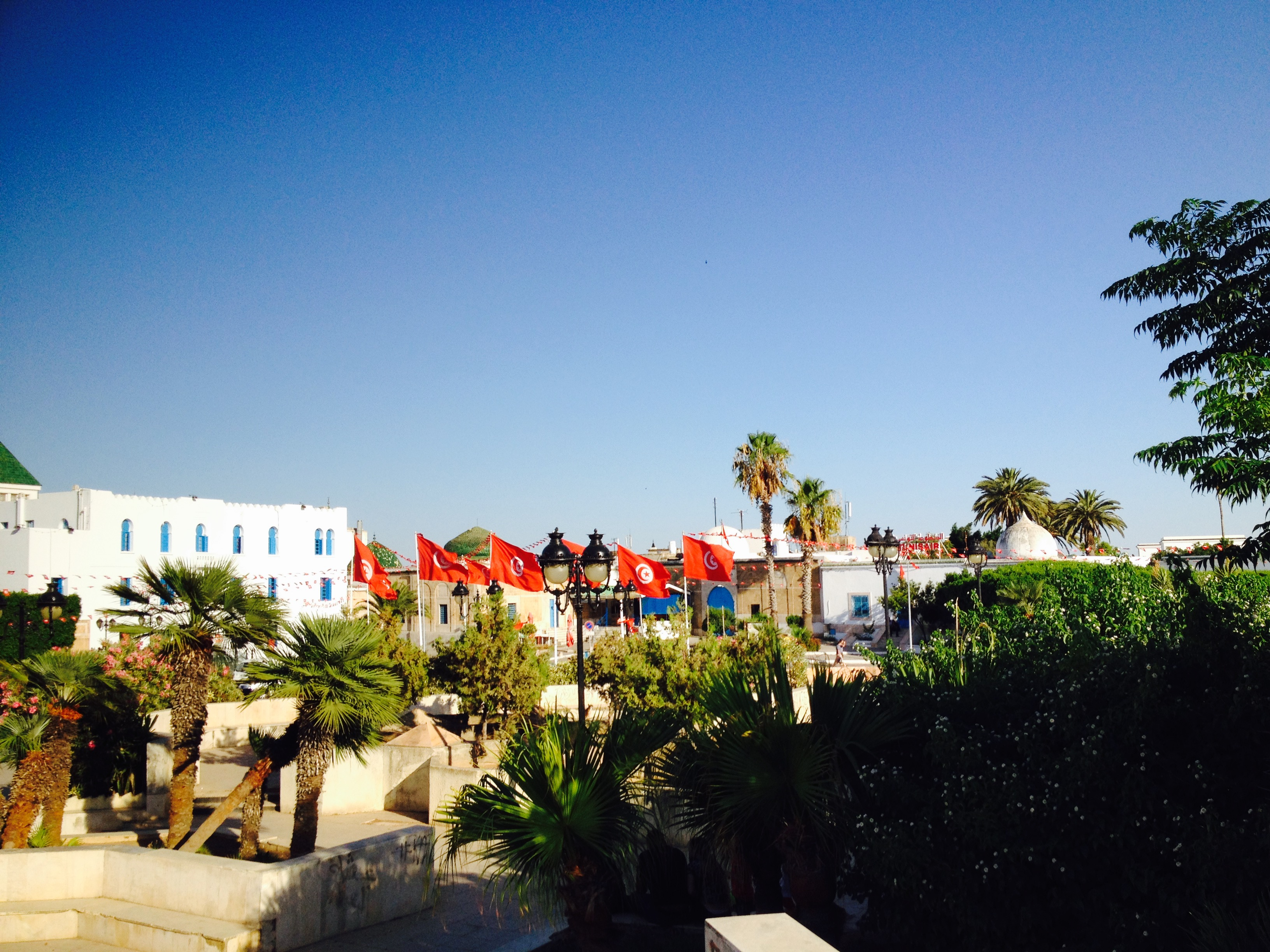
La Kasbah Square in Tunis

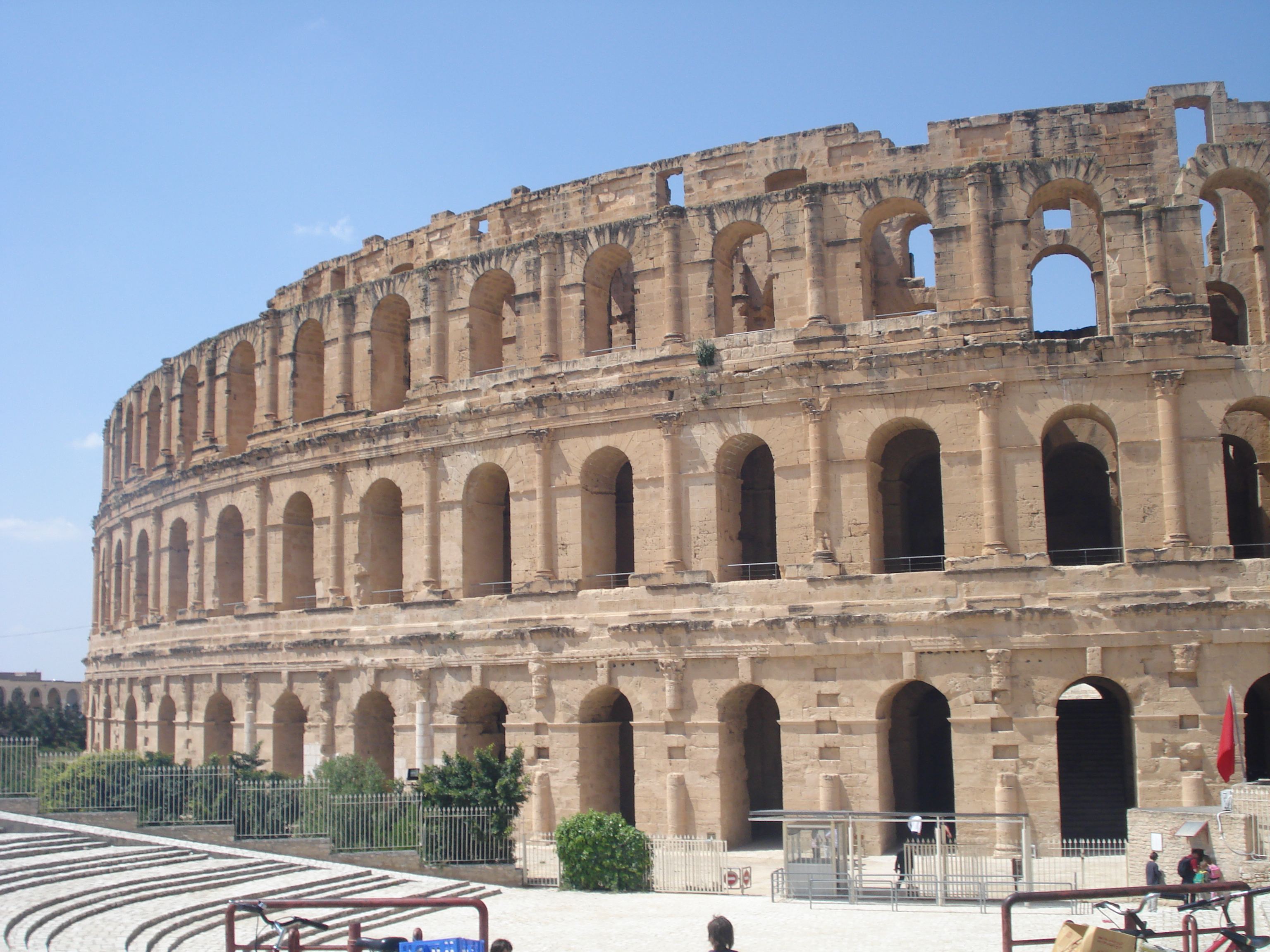
Amphitheatre of El Jem, the biggest in the world outside of Rome

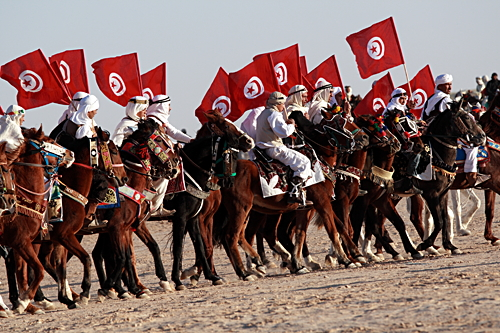
International Festival of the Sahara

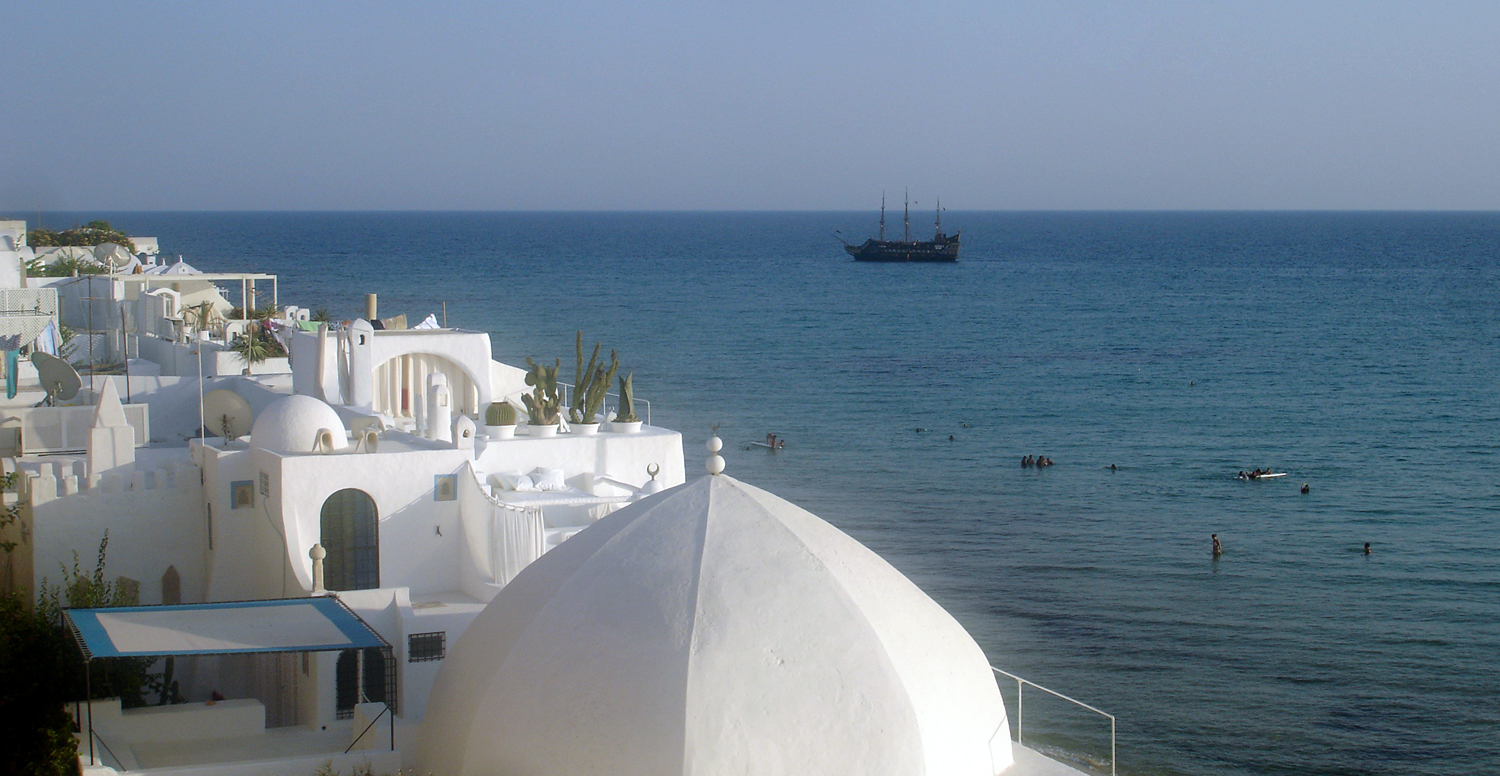
Hammamet, Nabeul Governorate

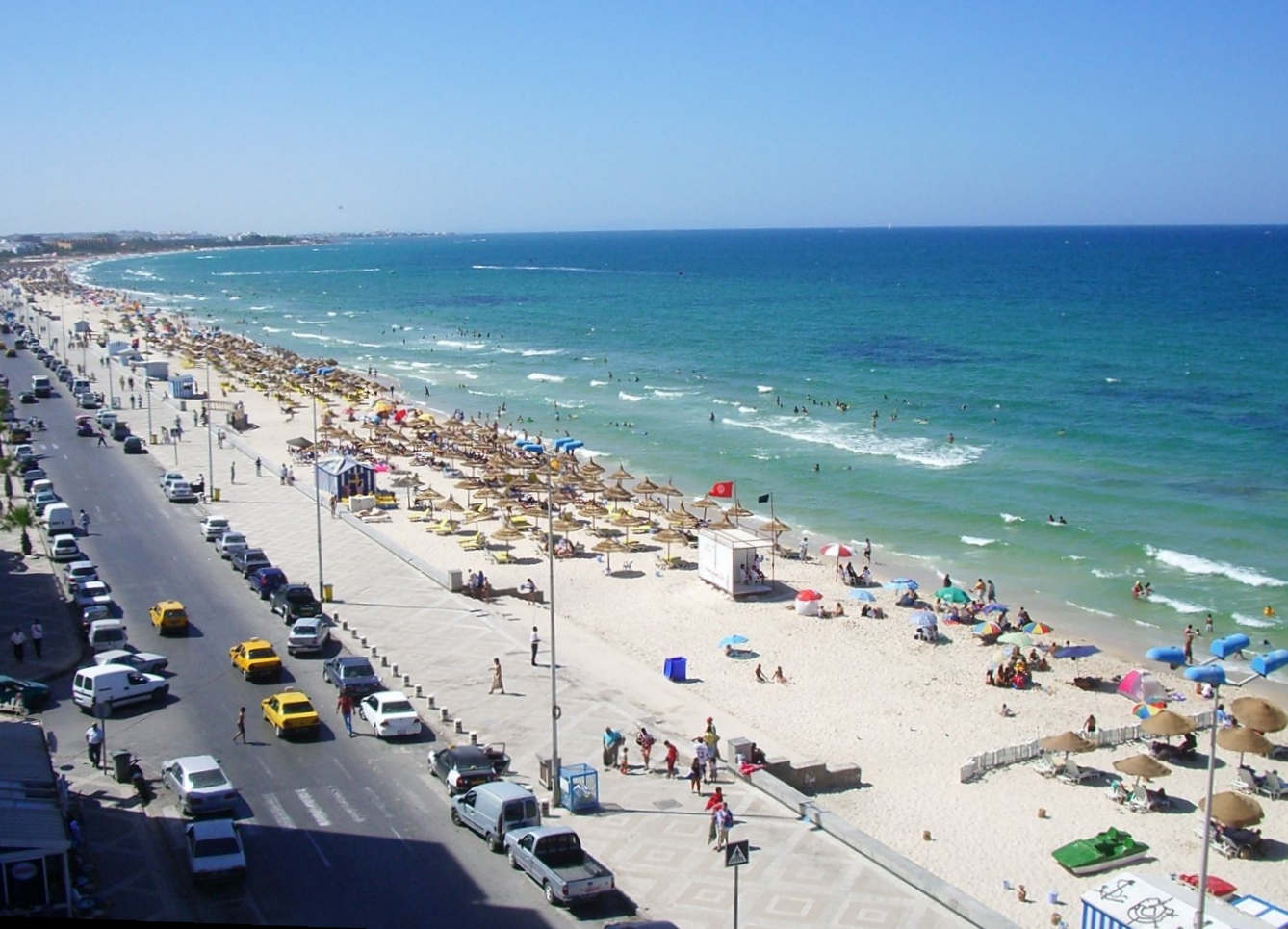
Sousse

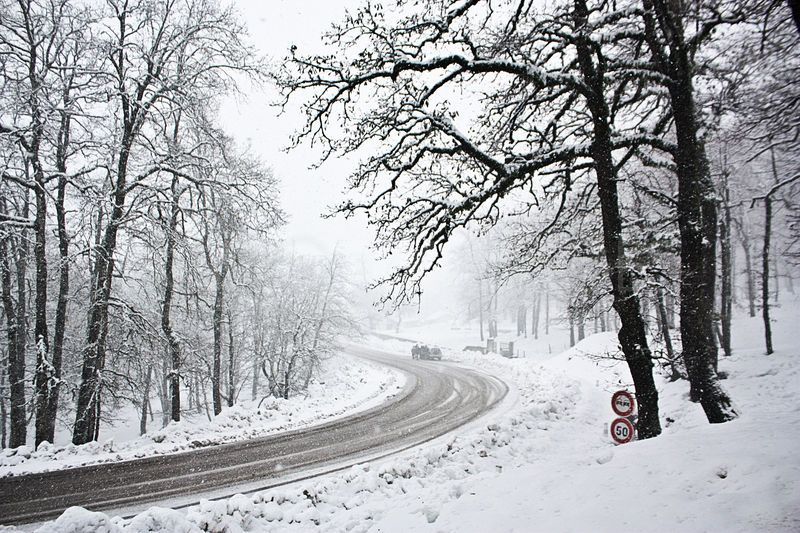
Snowfall in Tabarka

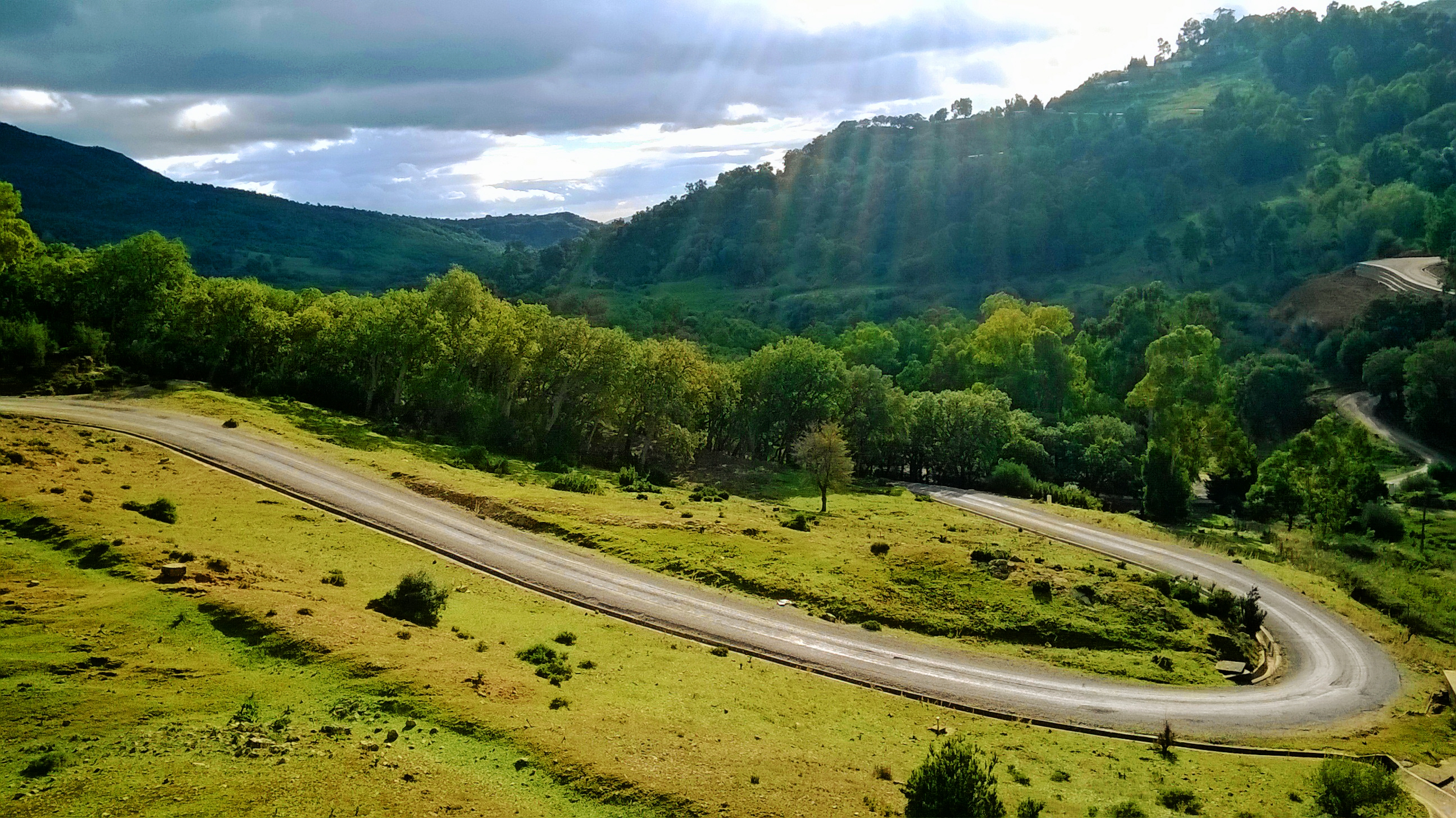
Forest near Aïn Draham

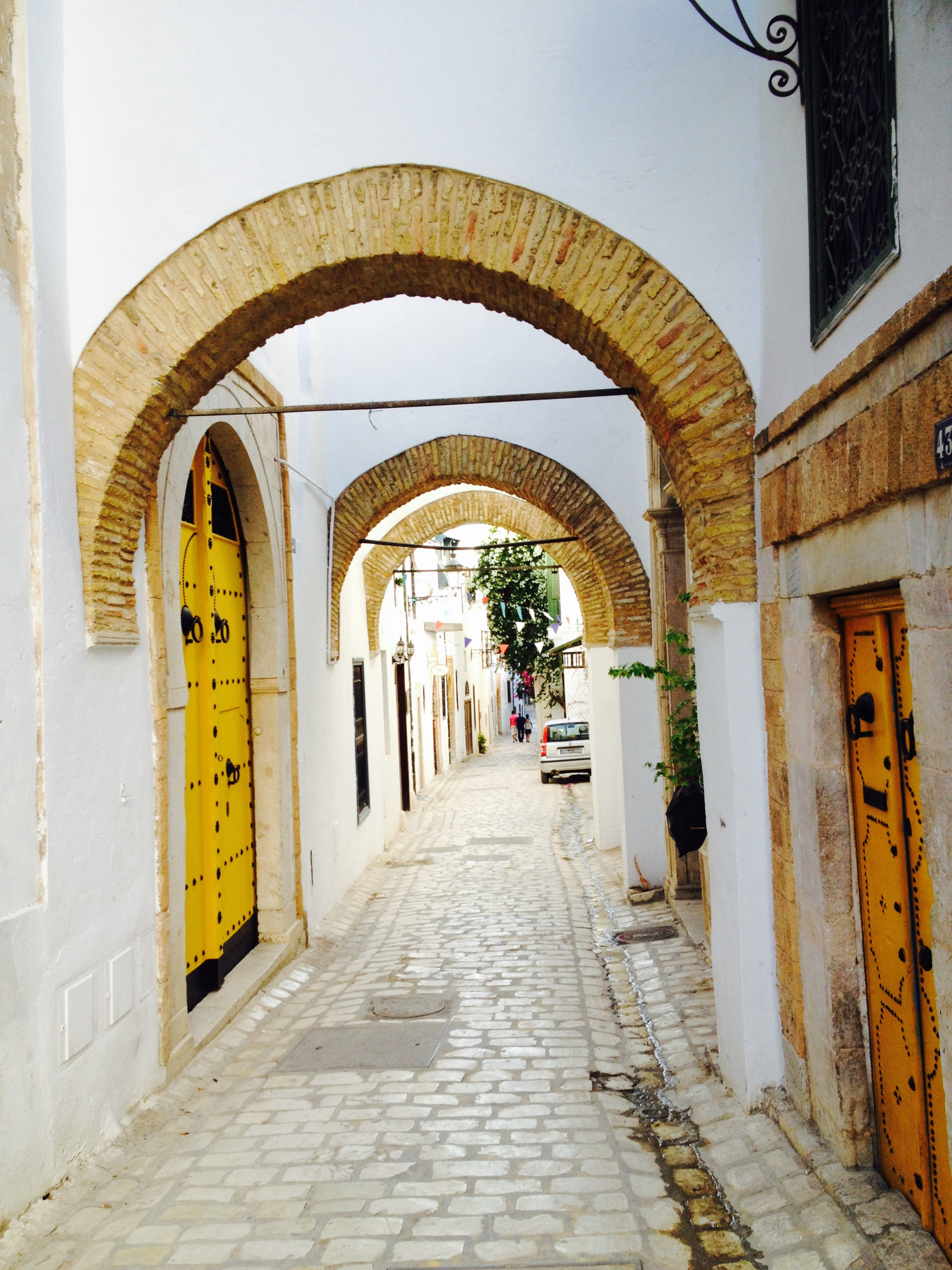
Medina of Tunis, a UNESCO world heritage site

=== UNESCO World Heritage Sites ===
Tunisia is home to eight UNESCO World Heritage Sites as well 13 others in the tentative list including the island of Djerba for its cultural and religious diversity.

Site	Image	Location	Area ha (acre)	Year	Description
Archaeological Site of Carthage		Tunis Governorate; 36°51′10″N 10°19′24″E	616 (1,520)	1979	Founded in the 9th century BC, Carthage developed into a trading empire spanning the Mediterranean. The city was destroyed in 146 BC in the Punic Wars at the hands of the Romans, but was later reestablished.
Dougga / Thugga		Béja Governorate; 36°25′25″N 9°13′13″E	70 (170)	1997	The site features the ruins of Dougga, a former capital of a Libyan–Punic state, which flourished under the Romans and the Byzantines, but went into decline in the Islamic period.
Amphitheatre of El Jem		Mahdia Governorate; 35°17′47″N 10°42′25″E	1.37 (3.4)	1979	Built during the 3rd century, the Amphitheatre of El Jem is North Africa's largest amphitheatre, and the largest one built outside of Italy, with a capacity of 35,000 spectators, regarded as among the most accomplished examples of Roman architecture of its kind.
Ichkeul National Park		Bizerte Governorate; 37°09′49″N 9°40′29″E	12,600 (31,000)	1980	Ichkeul Lake and the surrounding wetlands is a destination for hundreds of thousands of migrating birds, including ducks, geese, storks and pink flamingos. It was once part of a chain that extended across North Africa.
Kairouan		Kairouan Governorate; 35°40′54″N 10°06′14″E	68 (170)	1988	Founded in 670, Kairouan was the former capital of Ifriqiya and flourished in the 9th century. Its heritage includes the Mosque of Uqba and the Mosque of the Three Gates.
Medina of Sousse		Sousse Governorate; 35°49′40″N 10°38′19″E	32 (79)	1988	A prime example of a town from the early Islamic period, Sousse was an important commercial and military port during the 9th century.
Medina of Tunis		Tunis Governorate; 36°49′00″N 10°10′00″E	296 (730)	1979	The Medina of Tunis contains some 700 monuments, including palaces, mosques, mausoleums, madrasah and fourtains, testifying to Tunis' golden age from the 12th to the 16th century.
Punic Town of Kerkuane and its Necropolis		Nabeul Governorate; 36°56′47″N 11°05′57″E	—	1985	Abandoned in 250 BCE during the First Punic War and never rebuilt, Kerkuane is the only surviving example of a Phoenicio–Punic settlement.

=== Museums ===
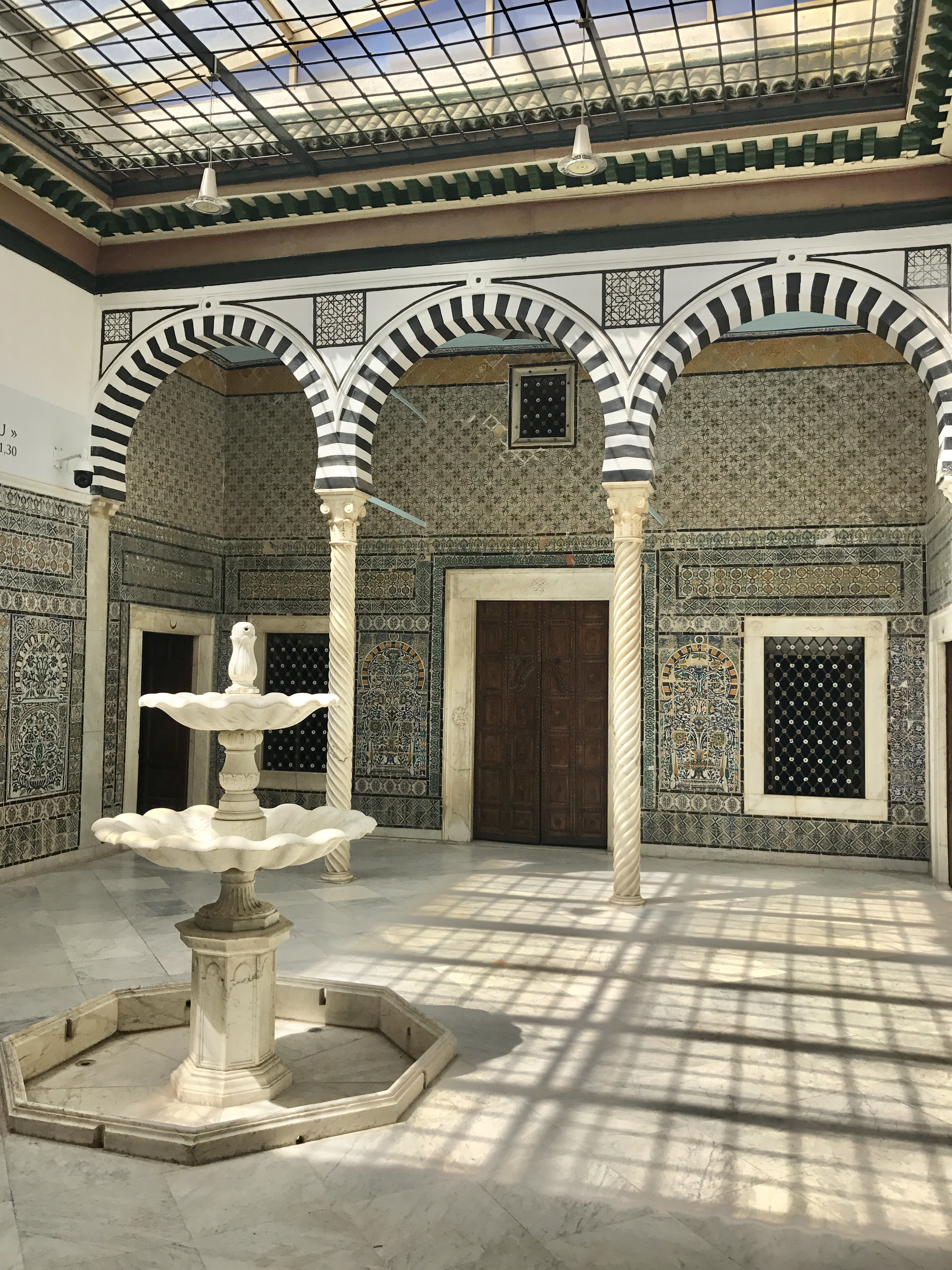
Courtyard of the small palace at the Bardo National Museum (Tunis)

This is a list of some important museums in Tunisia:

Name	City	Type	Year established
Bardo National Museum (Tunis)	Tunis	National museum	1888
Carthage National Museum (formerly known as the Lavigerie Museum)	Carthage	National museum	1875
Sousse Archaeological Museum	Sousse	Archaeological museum	1951
Musée Dar Cheraït	Tozeur	History museum	1990
Dar Jellouli Museum	Sfax	Art museum	1939
El Djem Archaeological Museum	El Djem	Archaeological museum	1970
Musée des arts et traditions populaires de Djerba	Djerba	History museum	2008
Musée des arts et traditions populaires de Monastir	Monastir	History museum	
Musée des arts et traditions populaires de Tunis	Tunis	Art museum	1978
Musée du patrimoine insulaire de Kerkennah	Kerkennah	History museum	2006

=== Resorts ===
This sector is popular mainly on the east coast, totaling more than 95% of beds. The following is a list of the largest resorts and the percentage of nights out of the total:

- Sousse-Monastir-Mahdia (36%)
- Nabeul-Hammamet (24%)
- Djerba-Zarzis (40%)
- Tunis-Zaghouan (10%)
- Tabarka-Aïn Draham (2%)

=== Golf ===
Tunisia is also a pioneer golfing destination in the Mediterranean. It offers world-class golf courses available year-round due to the sunny and pleasant weather. Among the most important golf courses of the country:

- Yasmine Valley in Hammamet
- Citrus (La Foret) in Hammamet
- El Kantaoui (Panorama) in Port El Kantaoui
- Tabarka golf course
- Citrus (Les Oliviers) in Hammamet
- Residence Tunis in Gammarth
- Flamingo Monastir
- El Kantaoui (Sea) in Port El Kantaoui
- Djerba (La Mer and Les Palmiers)
- Carthage golf course in La Soukra

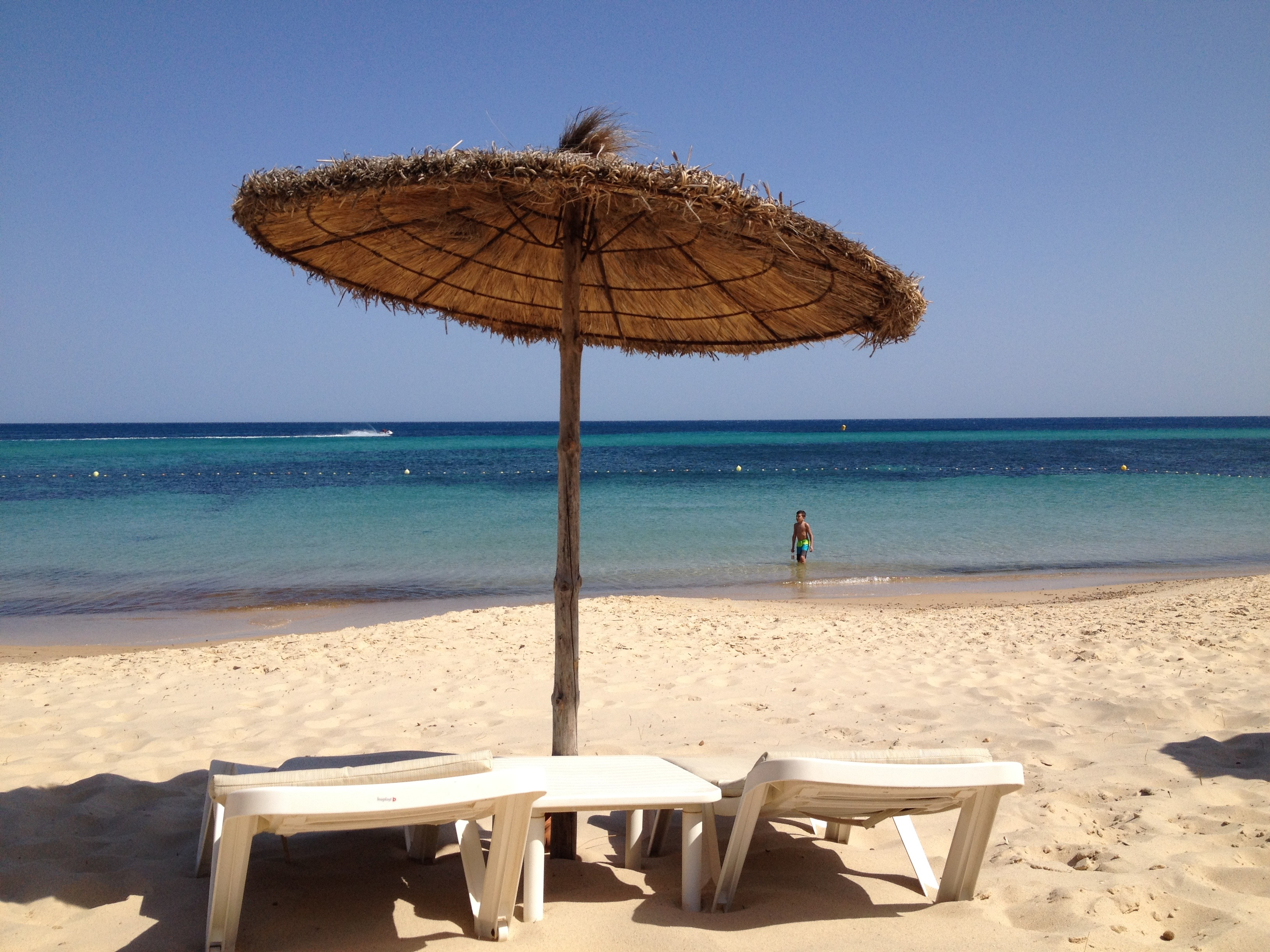
A beach in Hammamet during the summer

=== Marinas ===
Tunisia is one of the African countries with the most marinas. Its yachting infrastructure attracts mostly European tourists who flee the harsh winter in their home countries to enjoy the pleasant weather and relatively warmer sea in Tunisia. The country is planning to create additional marinas in the coming years such as the one in the new modern economic center of Tunis Financial Harbor.

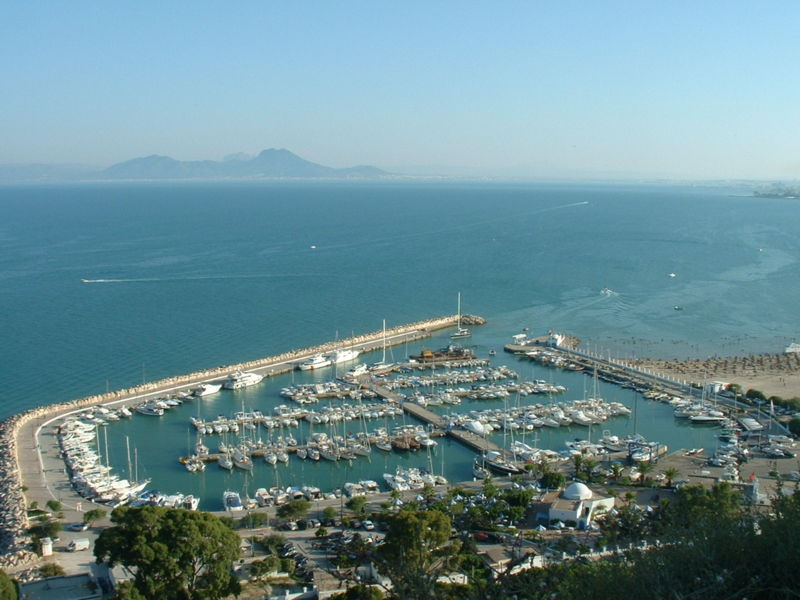
Sidi Bou Said marina

The existing marinas are 8 from the north to the south of the coast:

- Yasmine Hammamet Marina in Hammamet
- Bizerte Marina in Bizerte
- El Kantaoui Marina in Port El Kantaoui
- Sidi Bou Said Marina
- Gammarth Marina
- Tabarka Marina
- Marina Cap in Monastir
- Djerba Marina

=== Theme parks ===
Tunisia offers several theme parks and water parks in each of the main cities and tourist resorts and among them:

- Carthage Land in Hammamet
- Aqua Palace in Sousse
- Aqua Splash in Sousse
- Aqua Land in Yasmine Hammamet
- Dreamy Sea Waterpark in Hammamet
- Aqua land in Berges du Lac, Tunis
- Big Splash in Djerba
- Le Pirate in Djerba

=== Desert and film sets ===
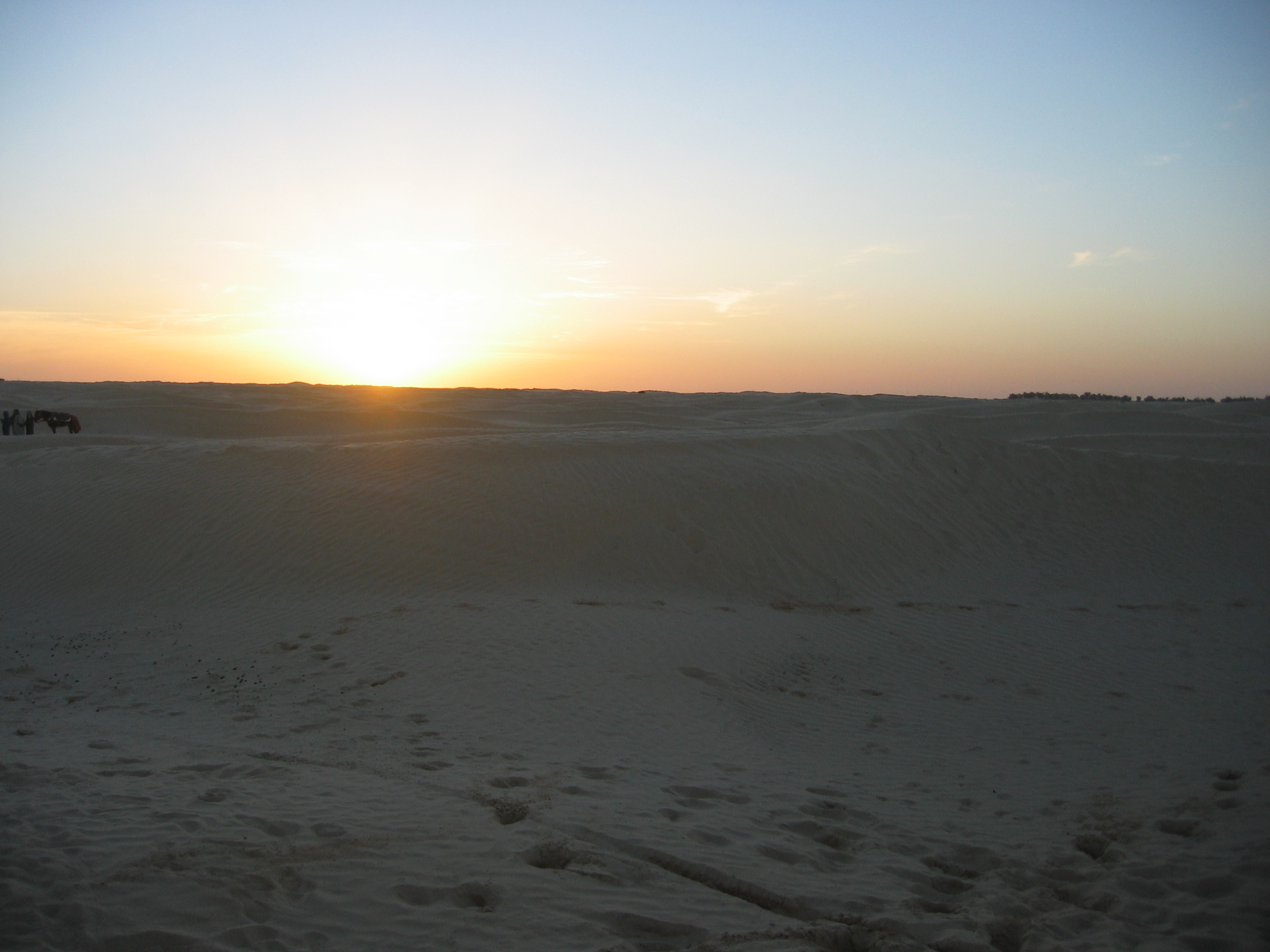
Douz desert dunes with camels and horses in the background during the sunset

The Tunisian desert represents a major tourist destination in the country. The oases add some greenness and shade to the aridity of the pristine environment and the hot sun of the Saharan dunes.

Since the Arab invasions on Tunisia, a growing population settled in the arid environment of the Numidian regions Medenine, Tataouine and Tozeur where they created oases as havens and also souks and old towns as new urban centers.

Tozeur benefits from its 2,000 years old town and it seeks to continue its growth of the tourism industry, specifically to prepare for the winter and springs season. Several hotels and maisons d’hote opened in Tozeur as well as some upscale units such as the world-famous Thai brand, Anantara.

Taking a horse carriage to visit the oases and to taste Deglet Nour as well as going to Chott el Djerid, the largest salt lake in the Sahara Desert are recommended activities to try in the region. The canyons and rocky mountains of the south as in Mides and the Berber village of Chebika, Tozeur can be visited while taking the old and luxurious Lézard rouge train for a few ride hours stopping at many natural stations.

With George Lucas's inspiration for Star Wars protagonist Luke Skywalker's home planet of Tatooine coming from Tunisia, the Tunisian City Tataouine and Matmata's underground houses became tourist destinations. Numerous other Hollywood movies were filmed in the Tunisian south, such as The English Patient.

=== Festivals and nightlife ===
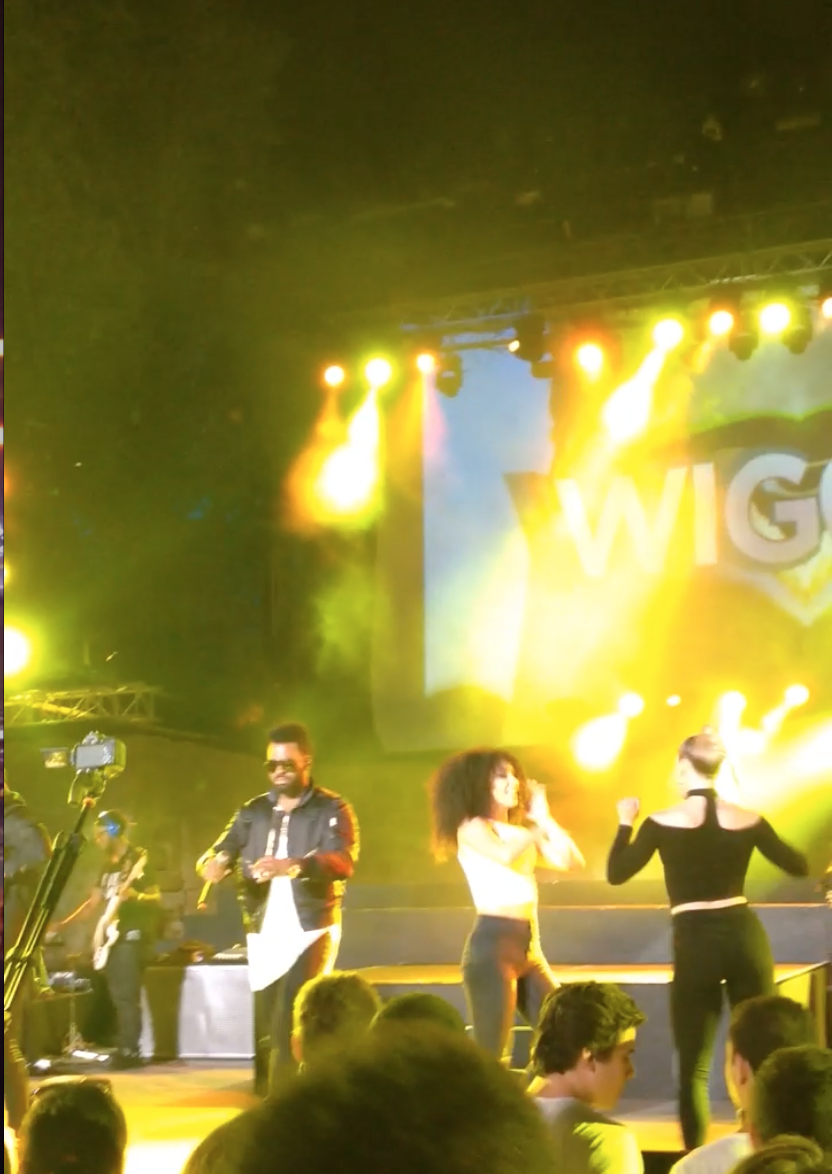
Jason Derulo at the International Festival of Carthage

During the summer, Tunisia becomes the venue of a multitude of festivals welcoming Arab and world-famous stars as International Festival of Carthage, Hammamet International Festival and Djem Symphonic Festival. Outdoor bars and nightclubs have made of Tunisia's metropolitan areas very lively during the whole day in the summer and at night especially in Gammarth and Hammamet.

=== Shopping ===
Souks and historical handicraft markets are present in the old towns of the country. They used to represent the commercial center of each city but they are now major tourist attractions. The old souks of Tunis for example have separated sections for each type of handicraft such as for the Chechia, the jewelry, etc.

Modern shopping infrastructure has also developed in the recent years attracting big international brands. Despite the creation of many new shopping malls such as Tunisia Mall in Berges du Lac, Mall of Sousse and Azur City Mall in the southern suburb of Tunis, they are all located in the capital city or in the coastal touristic cities.

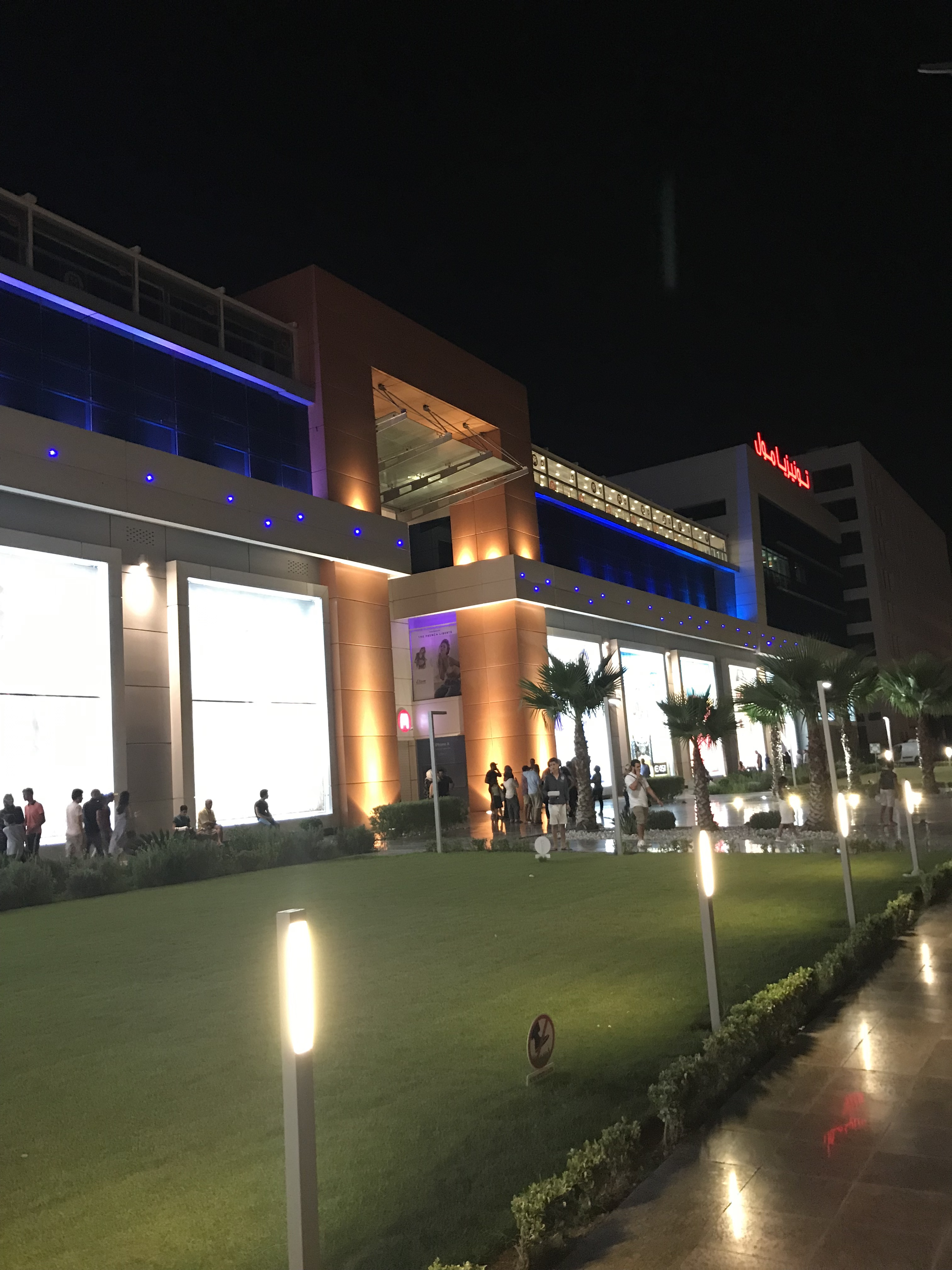
Tunisia mall, a large mall in the capital.

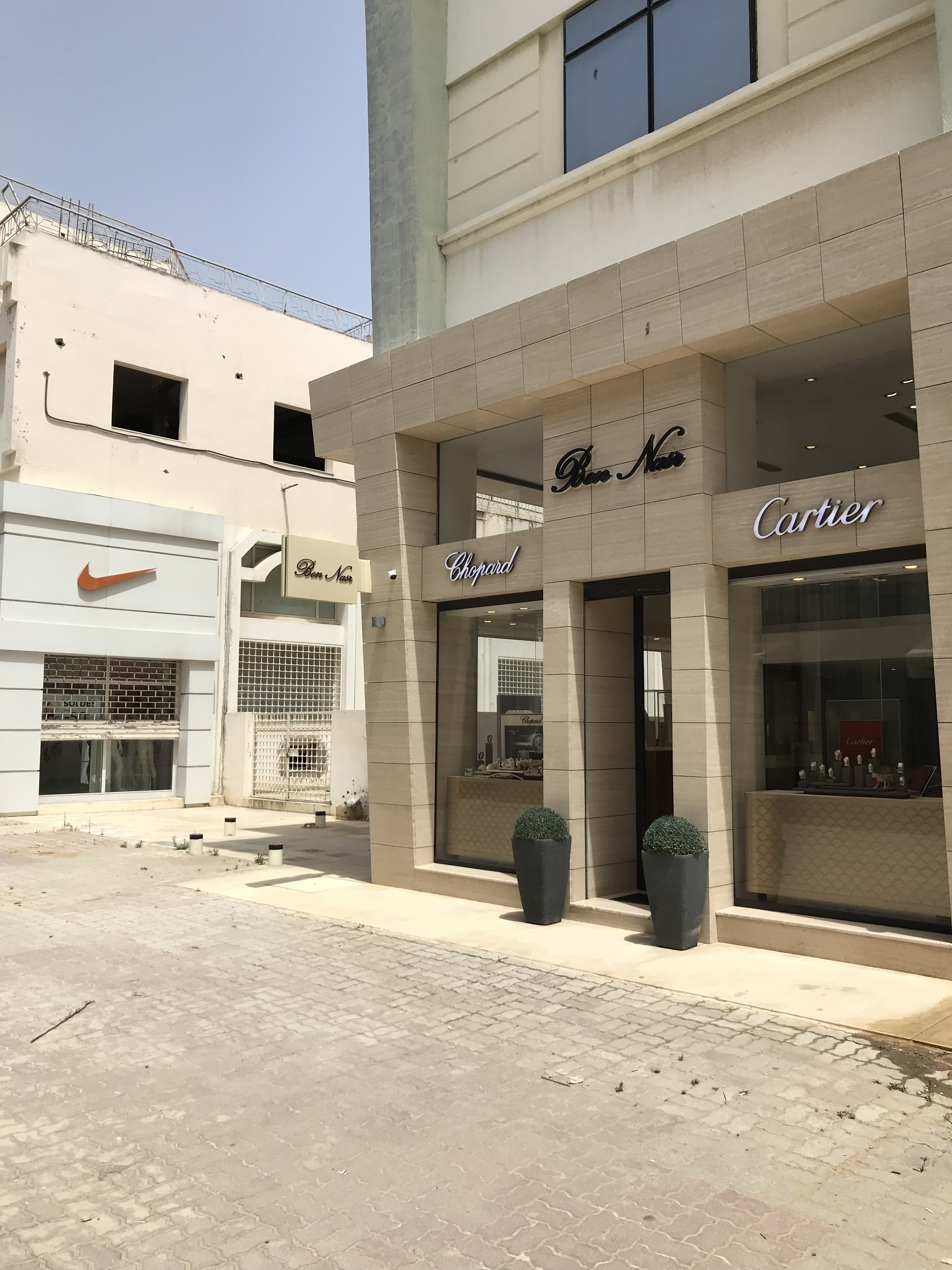
Some luxury shops in the affluent neighborhood of Berges du Lac.

=== New developments ===
In recent years, ecotourism, spas and medical tourism are emerging into Tunisia's tourist scene and growing quickly. According to the former Minister of Tourism Ahmed Smaou, "The medical tourism has a great future ahead of us."

== Statistics ==
In 2000, there were 197,400 hotel beds in roughly 95,977 rooms with an occupancy rate at 56%. 5,057,193 travelers came to Tunisia that year. That year, tourist expenditures were nearly $1.5 billion. According to 2002 US Department of State estimates, the average daily cost of staying in Tunis or Carthage was $146, compared to $114 in other areas of Tunisia.

A large number of tourists to Tunisia come from Eastern Europe, and the nationalities of major tourist countries is shown here: Libyans (1,472,411 visitors), French (1,234,735), Algerians (945,324), Germans (547,403), Italians (464,323) and British (350,693). There were 1,251,251 domestic tourists staying across the country for 2.75 million nights in 2006.

Tourist arrivals of 2024 in %

Yearly tourist arrivals in millions

=== Recent years ===
Year	Arrivals (million)	Earnings (dinar)
2010	6.902.749	3.522,5
2011	4.781.896	2.432,6
2012	5.590.464	3.175,3
2013	6.268.582	3.229,4
2014	6.068.593	3.575,6
2015	5.359.309	2.354,6
2016	5.724,021	2.322,9
2017	7.051.993	2.713,1
2018	8.300.000	4.093,0
2019	9.429.000	5.612,2

== See also ==
- Visa policy of Tunisia
