= International Festival of Carthage =

Tunisian annual music festival

The International Festival of Carthage (Arabic: مهرجان قرطاج الدولي) is an annual music festival taking place in July and August since 1964 in the coastal city of Carthage (Tunisia).

== History ==
It was established as a two-day Jazz festival on the initiative by intellectuals in the early 1960s. In 1964 it was taken over by the Tunisian Ministry of Culture and its location became the Carthage Amphitheatre which was renovated for the festival. The amphitheatre has a capacity of 7,500 spectators. Since its founding, the Carthage Festival has attracted such artists from the Arab world as Ali Riahi, Hedi Jouini, Saber Rebaï, Kadhim Saher, Najwa Karam, Warda, Sherine and Majida El Roumi.

The festival features Arab-Mediterranean culture and all kinds of artwork. The festival has also played host to Jean Michel Jarre, Youssou N'Dour, Dalida, James Brown, Louis Armstrong, Ray Charles, Alpha Blondy, Joe Cocker, Serge Lama, Amália Rodrigues, Gérard Lenorman, Khaled and Charles Aznavour, as well as plays, dance, folk, and ballet.
