= Gammarth =

- Town
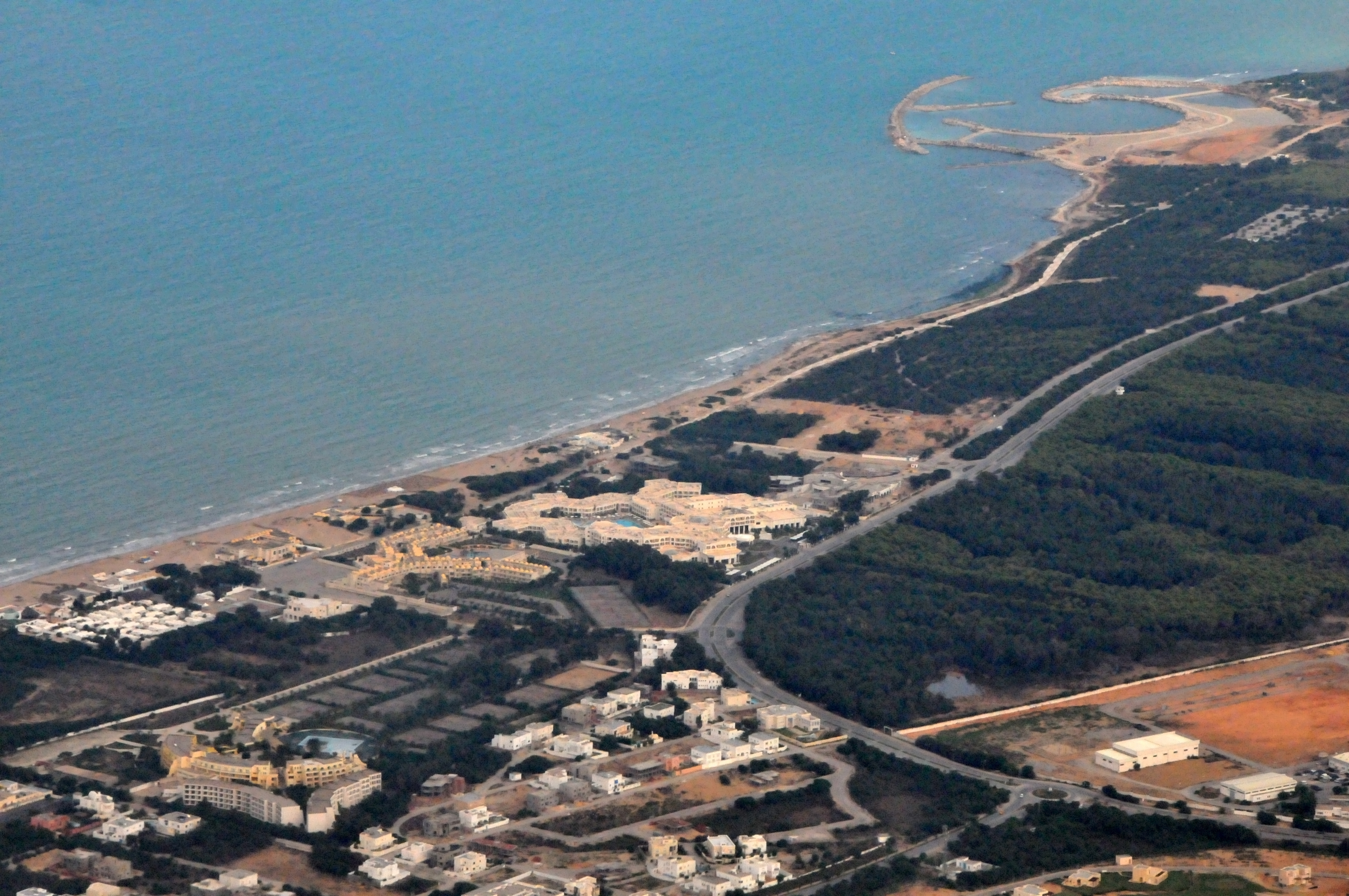

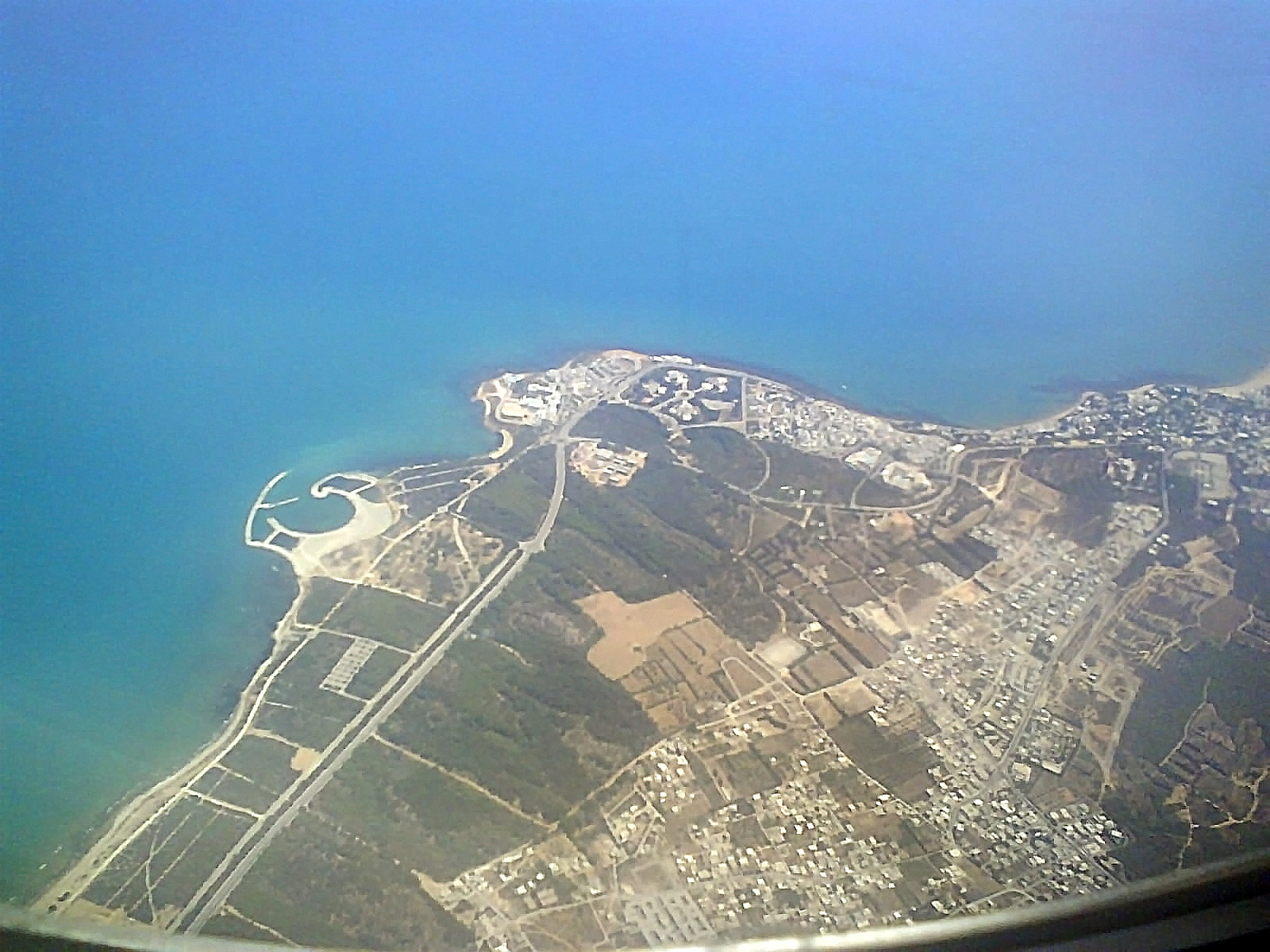
- Aerial view of the coastline

- Location within Tunisia
- Coordinates: - 25000) 36°54′35″N 10°17′12″E
- Country: Tunisia
- Governorate: Tunis Governorate

Population (2023)
  - Total: 15,000 - 25,000
- Time zone: UTC+1 (CET)

Gammarth (Tunisian Arabic: ڨمرت gammart) is a town on the Mediterranean Sea in the Tunis Governorate of Tunisia, located some 15 to 20 kilometres north of Tunis, adjacent to La Marsa. It is an upmarket seaside resort, known for its expensive hotels and shops. In the marina bay area, there's a well served pleasance port with a naval shipyard, once privately owned and, as 2023, managed by the public port authority. Gammarth began as a small fishing village but following independence from France it blossomed into a resort from the 1950s. Tourism now provides the backbone to the local economy. Gammarth has many five-star hotels and restaurants and also contains many lavish white villas and coves in the vicinity. Notable villas include Abou Nawas Gammarth and Les Dunes.

Gammarth also contains a notable cinema complex.

== Archaeology ==
Excavations at Gammarth Hill uncovered a Jewish necropolis, possibly dating to the 3rd century CE, featuring catacombs with Hebrew inscriptions and Jewish symbols, including the menorah, shofar, lulav, and etrog. Numerous lamps decorated with menorahs, as well as ceramic vessels and painted tiles, were also found. These findings point to a well-established Jewish presence in the area, when nearby Carthage was a thriving Roman city.

== Gallery ==
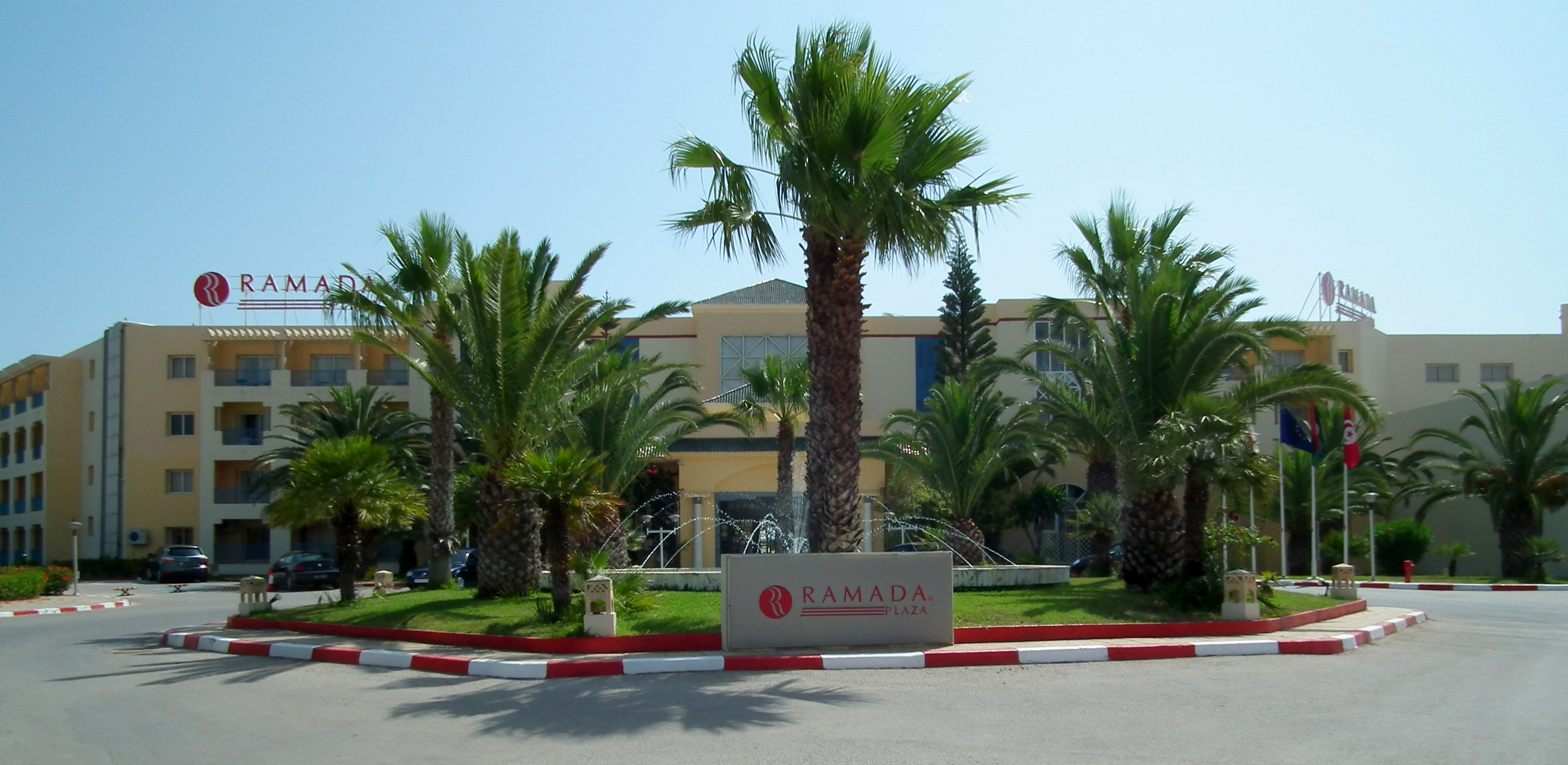

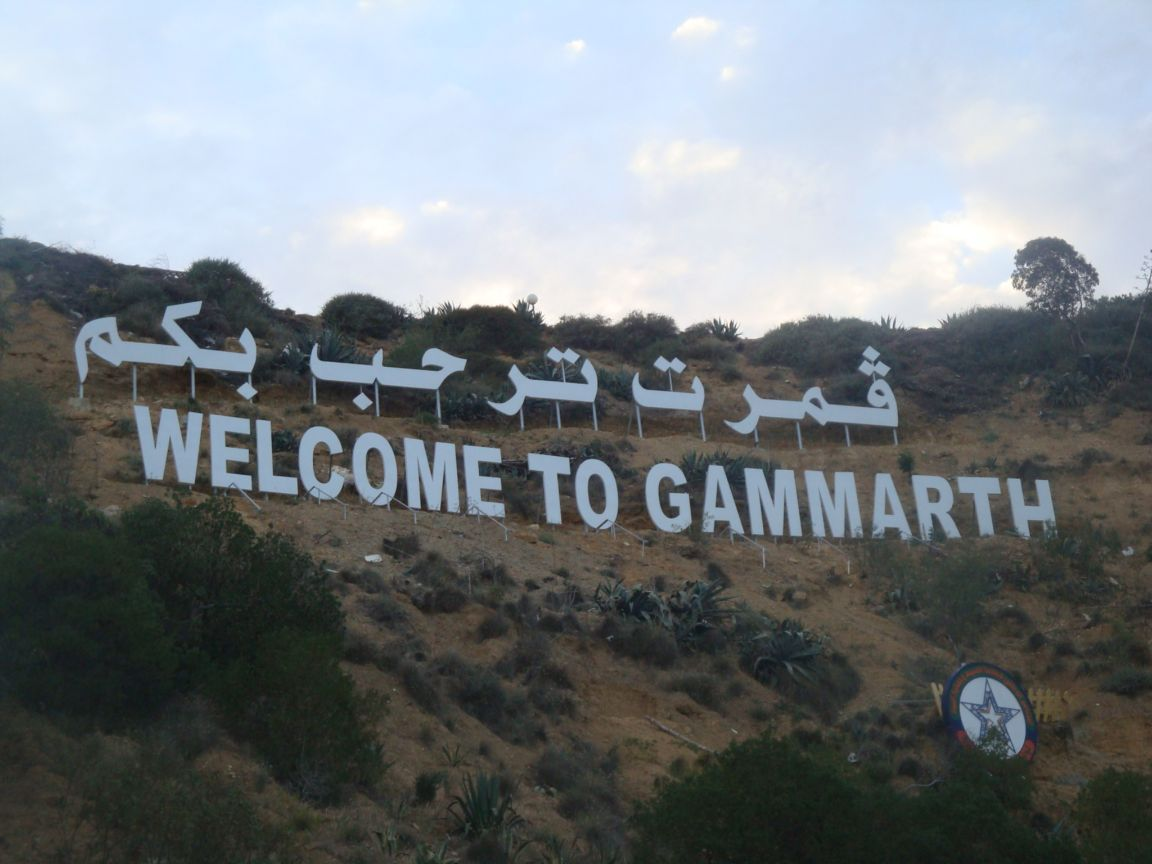

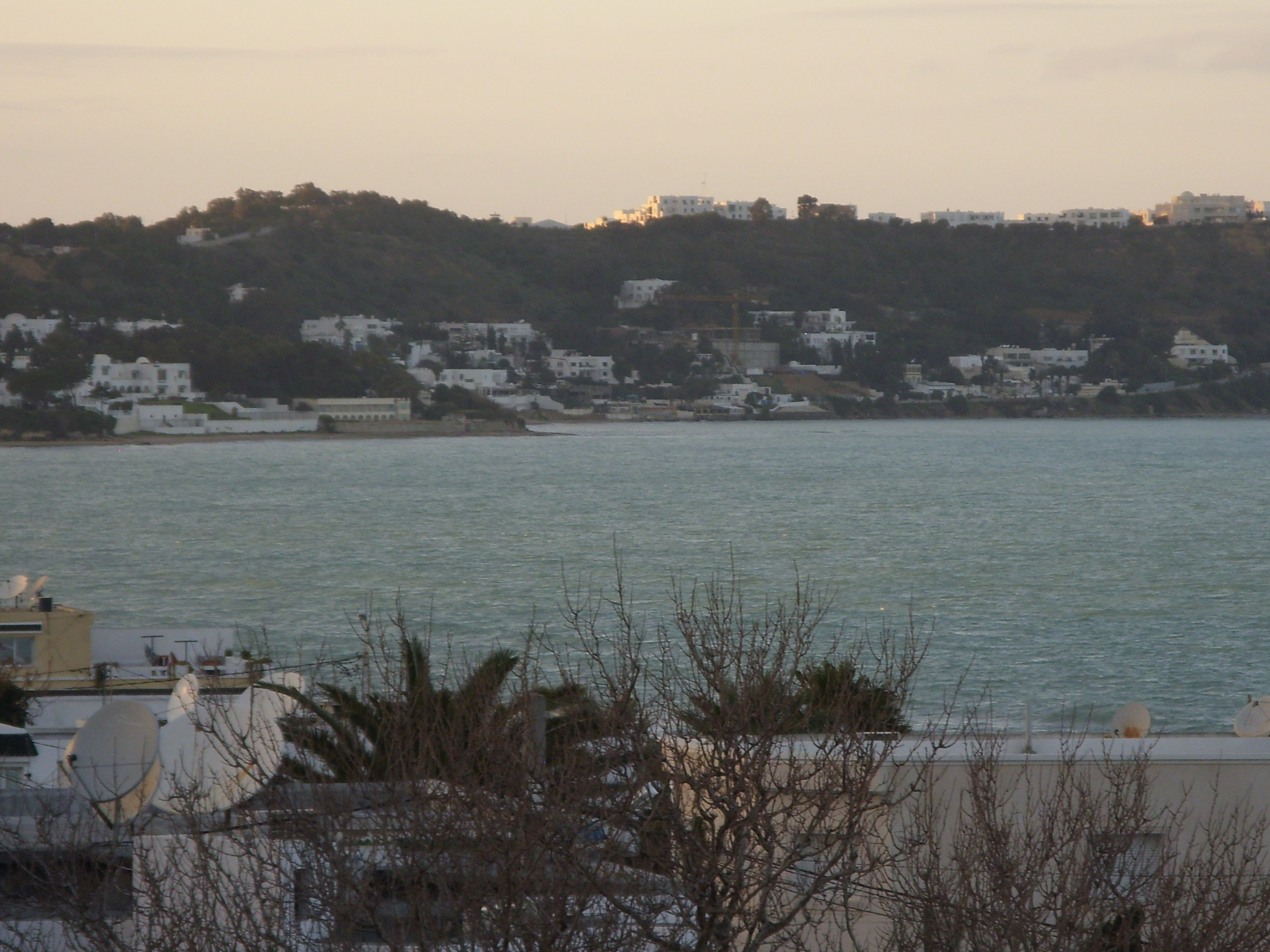

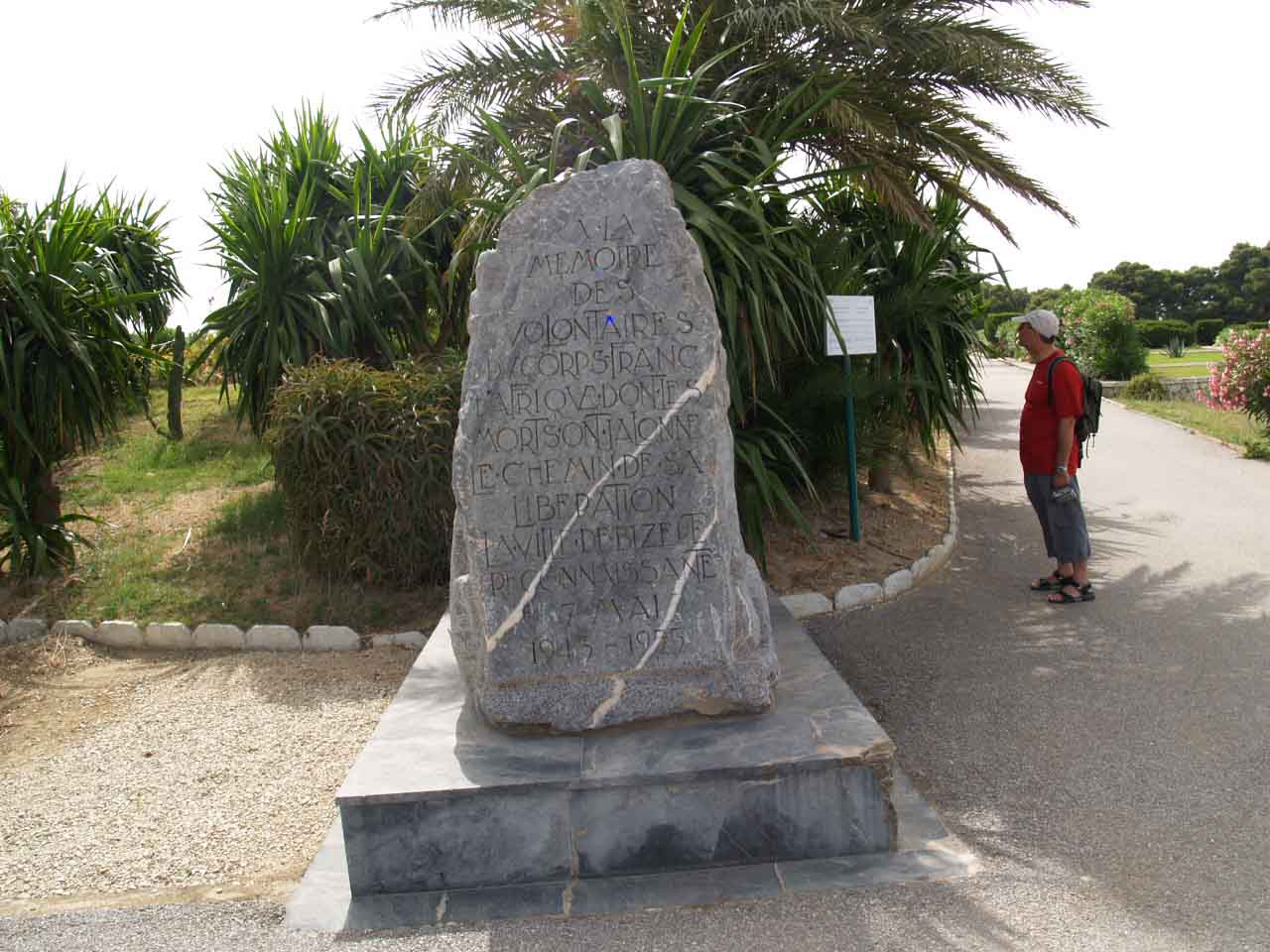

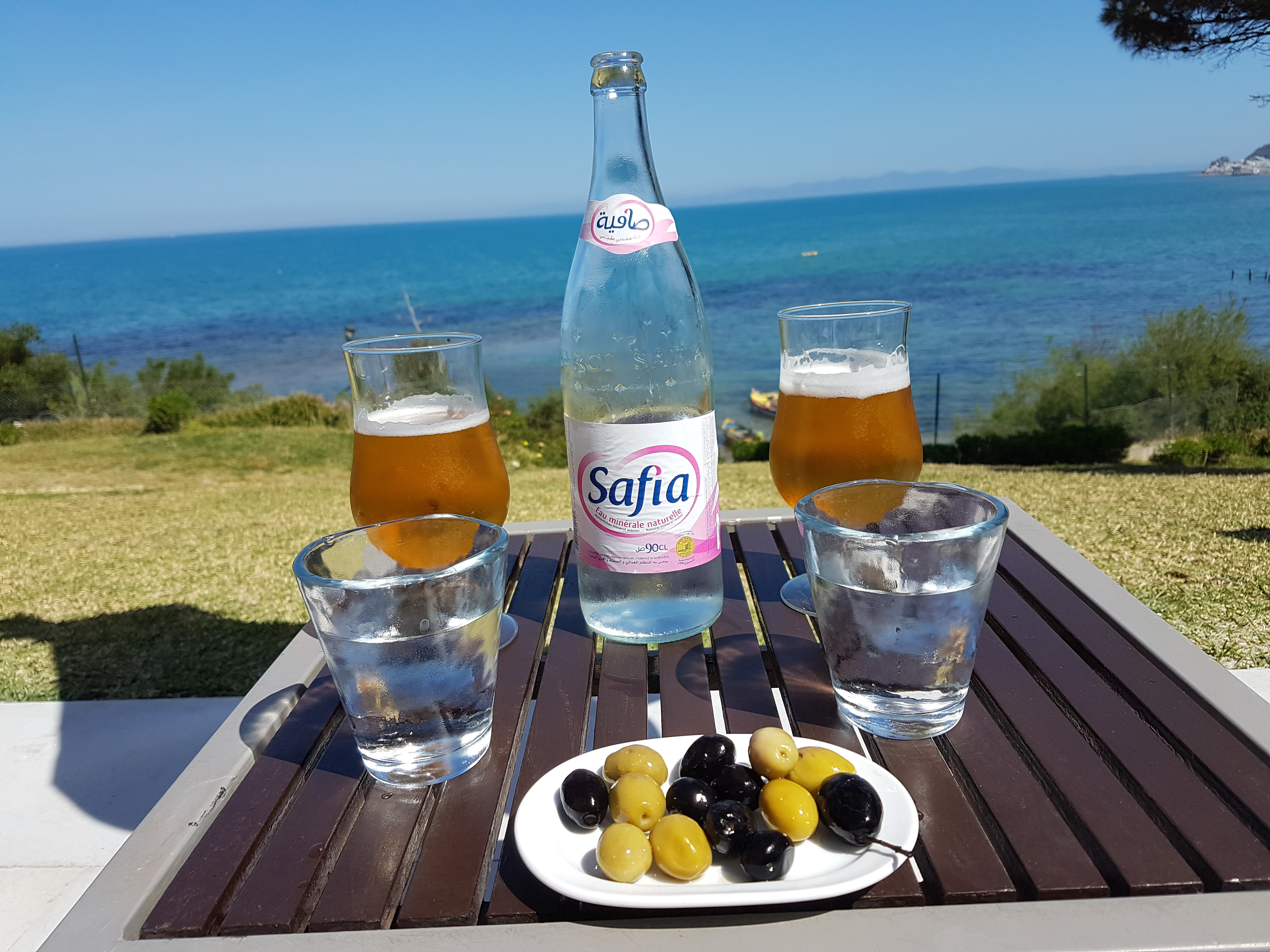
View from a hotel bar in Gammarth. Overlooking the Gammarth bay.

== See also ==
- List of cities in Tunisia
