= Bouficha =

- Commune and town
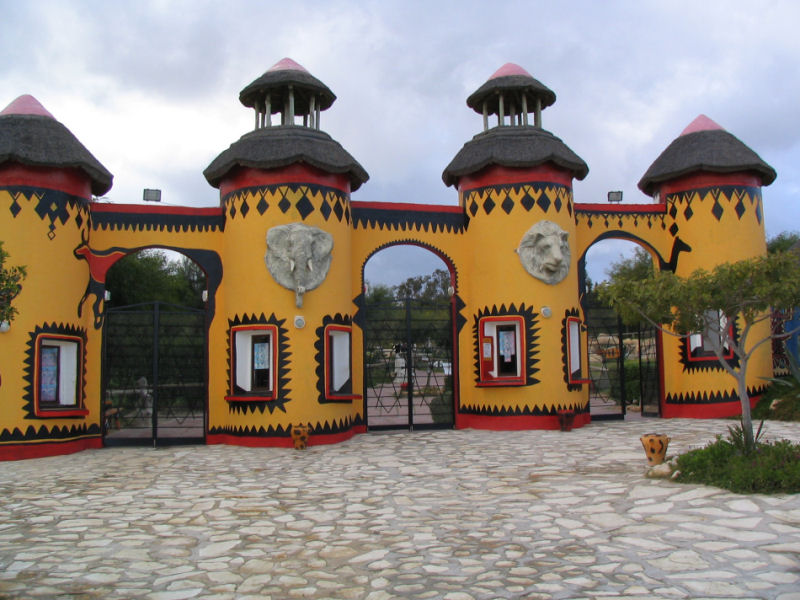
- Friguia park

- Location in Tunisia
- Coordinates: 36°18′00″N 10°27′18″E
- Country: Tunisia
- Governorate: Sousse Governorate
- Delegation(s): Bouficha

Government
  - Mayor: Abdallah Mzoughi (Nidaa Tounes)

Population (2014)
  - Metro: 9,931
- Time zone: UTC1 (CET)
- Website: http://www.commune-bouficha.gov.tn/

Bouficha (بوفيشة) or Bou Ficha is a Tunisian town situated about sixty kilometers south of Tunis, between Enfidha and Hammamet and close to the Gulf of Hammamet.

Administratively attached to the Sousse Governorate, it has a population of 9,931.

It is an important industrial center particularly in the textile sector. Near the town is the archaeological site of Pheradi Majus and a zoo, Friguia Park, on thirty hectares.

In July, a festival is held in polycultural Bouficha.

== Population ==
2014 Census (Municipal)
Homes	Families	Males	Females	Total
3065	2403	4981	4950	9931

== See also ==
- List of cities in Tunisia
