= Menzel =

Menzel may refer to:

== Places ==
- Cape Menzel, on Thurston Island in Antarctica; named for geologist Reinhard W. Menzel
- El Menzel, a town in Morocco

=== Places in Tunisia ===
- Menzel Abderrahmane, a town and commune
- Menzel Bourguiba, a town
- Menzel Bouzaiane, a town and commune
- Menzel Bouzelfa, a town and commune
- Menzel Chaker, a town
- Menzel Ennour, a town and commune
- Menzel Farsi, a town and commune
- Menzel Hayet, a town and commune
- Menzel Horr, a town and commune
- Menzel Jemil, a town and commune
- Menzel Kamel, a town and commune
- Menzel Mehiri, a town and commune
- Menzel Salem, a town and commune
- Menzel Temime, a town and commune

== Other ==
- Menzel (Djerba), a Tunisian housing type
- Menzel (surname) a surname of German origin
- Menzel (crater), a lunar crater named for Donald Howard Menzel
- Menzel 3, a young bipolar planetary nebula named for Donald Howard Menzel
- 1967 Menzel, an asteroid named for Donald Howard Menzel
- Adolph Menzel, artist
