= List of cities in Tunisia =

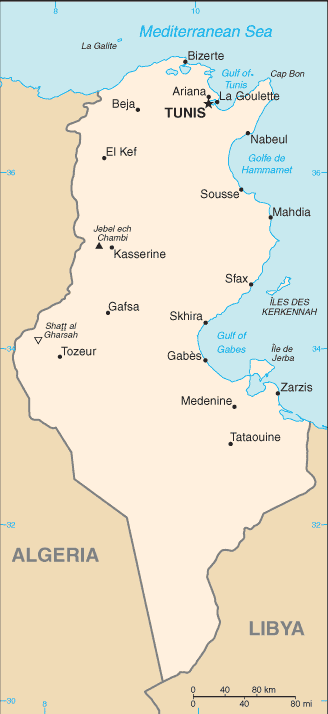
Map of Tunisia

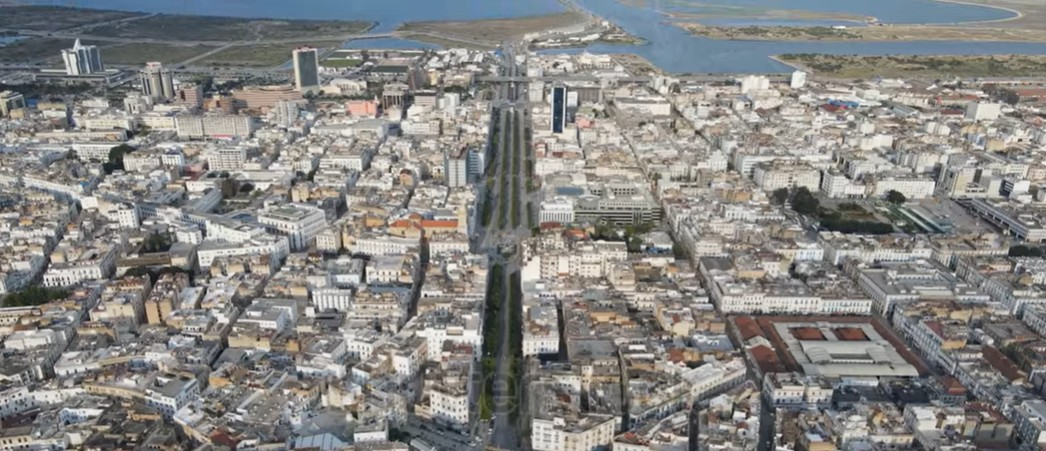
Tunis, Capital of Tunisia

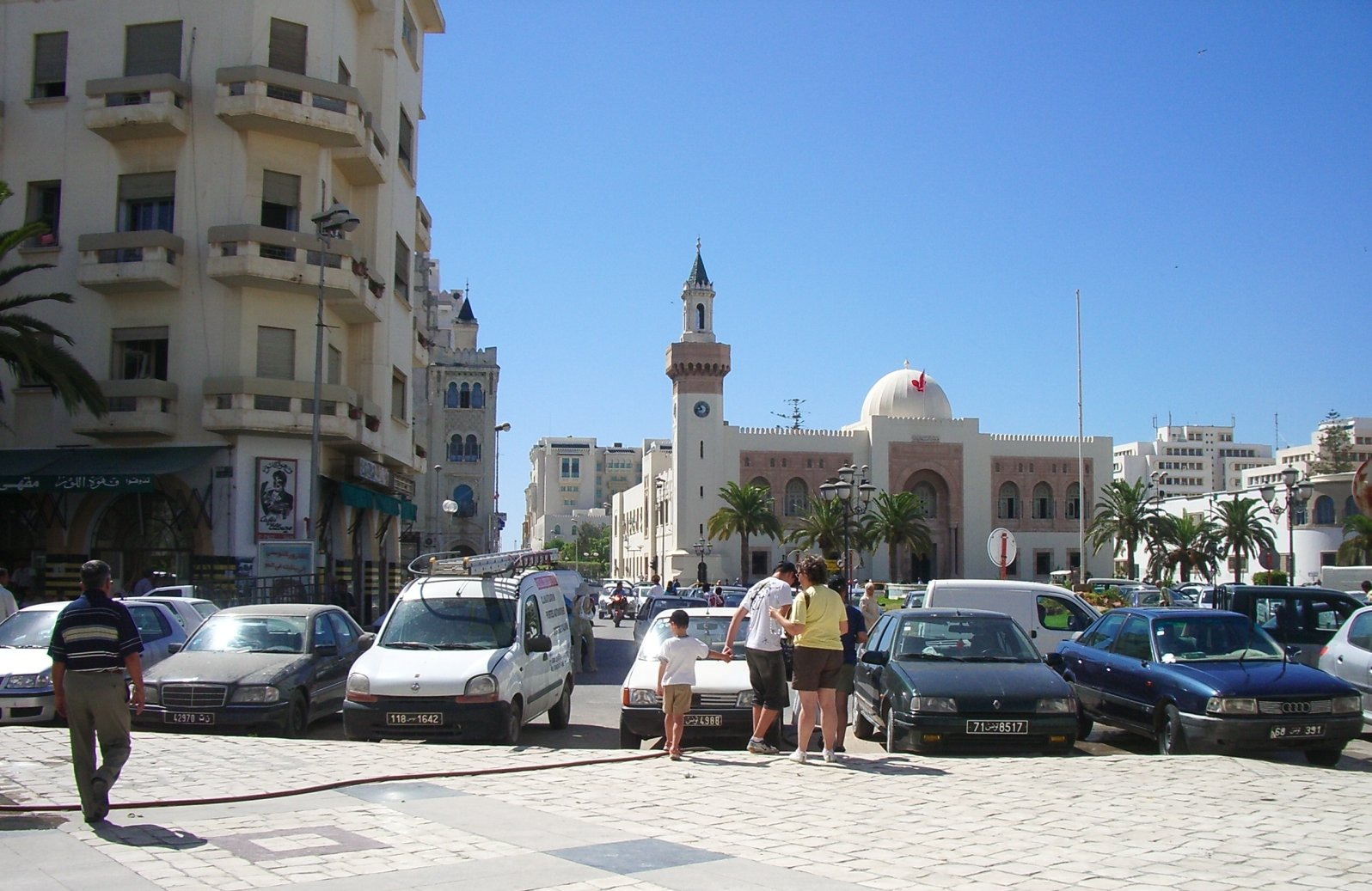
Sfax City Centre

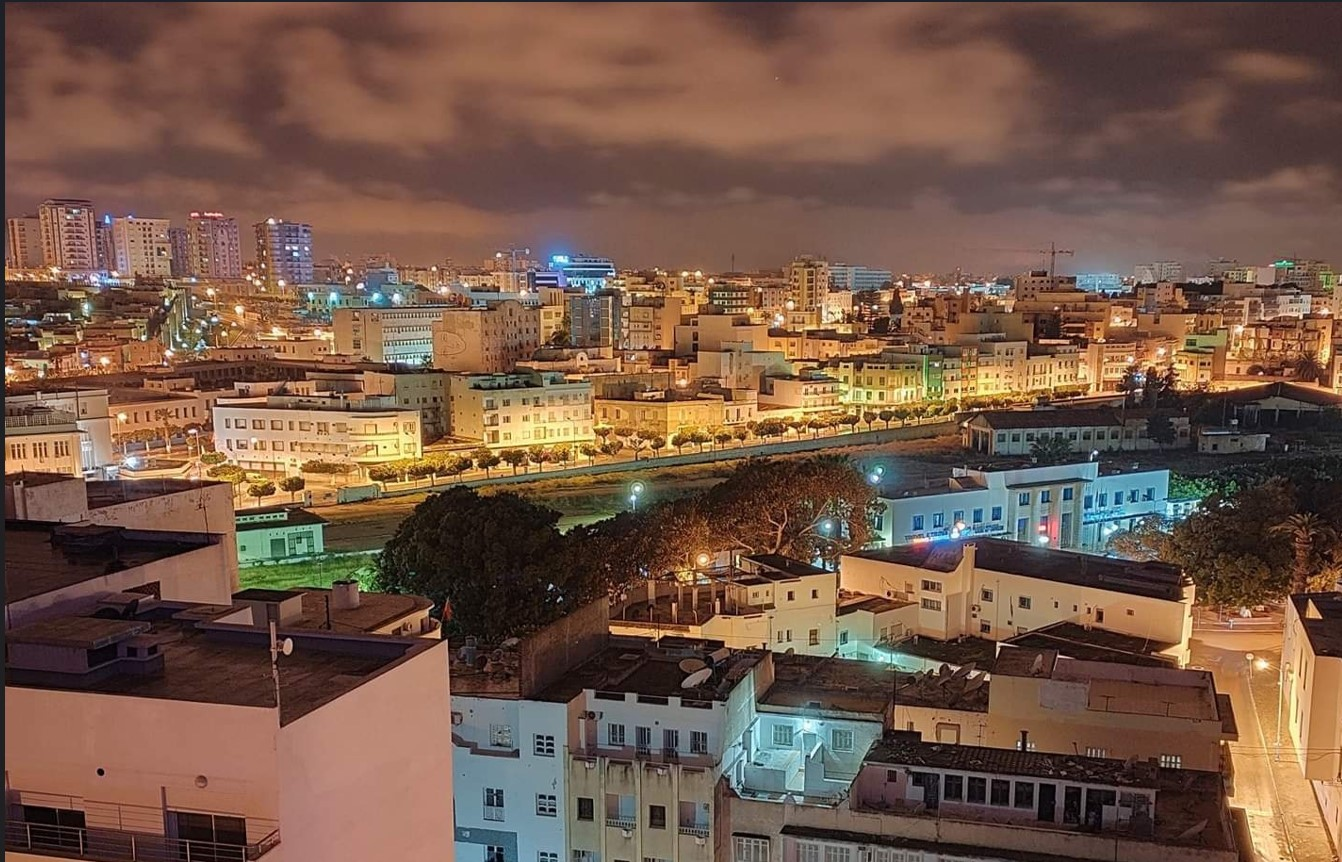
Skyline of Sousse

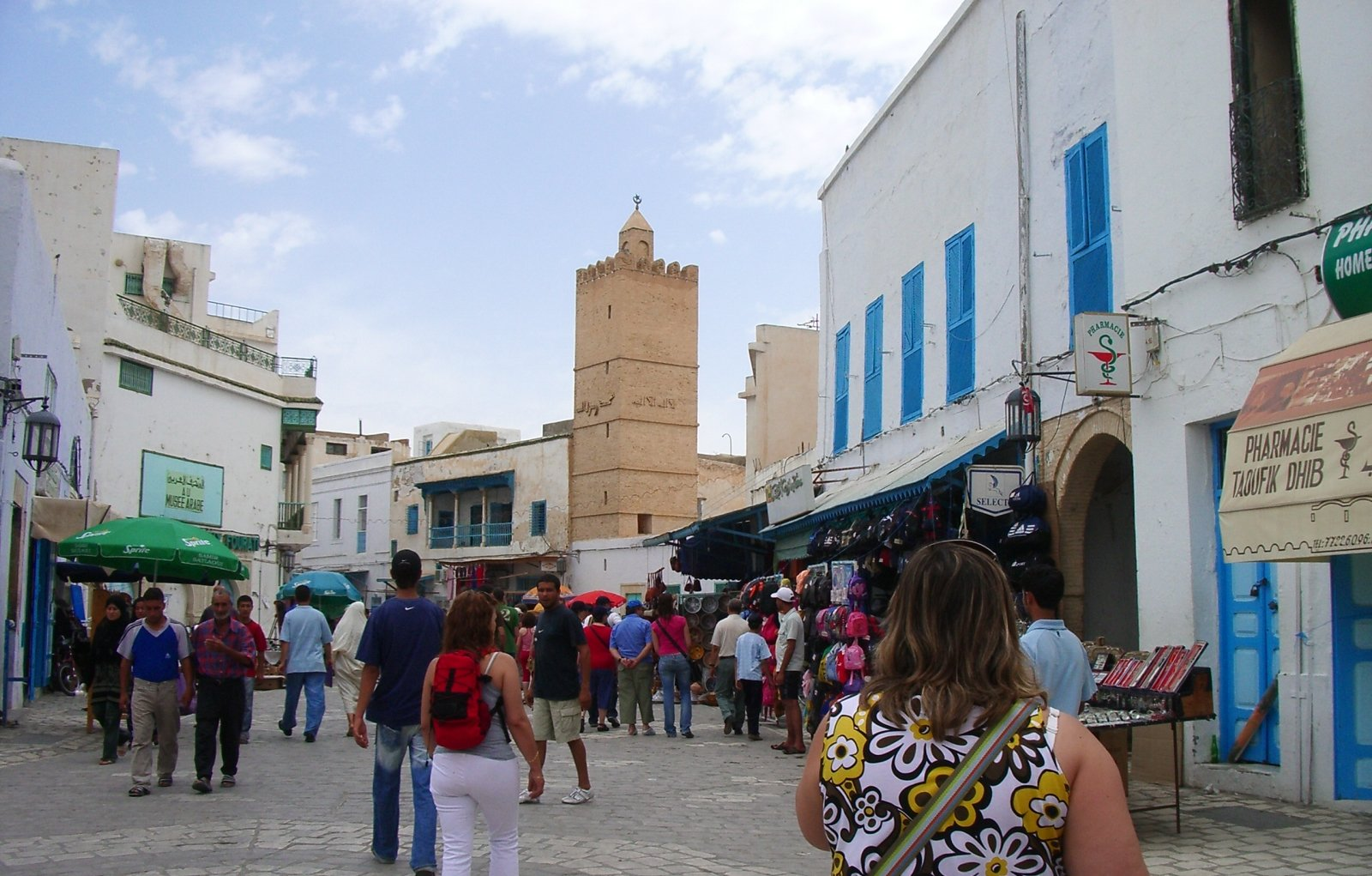
Central Kairouan

This is the list of 350 cities and towns in Tunisia. In the list by governorate, capitals are shown in bold.

== List of most-populated cities ==
This table lists the most populous cities and towns in Tunisia according to municipal (commune-level) populations from the General Population and Housing Census (RGPH) 2024 by the Institut national de la statistique (INS), as compiled in demographic sources. Populations refer to city proper boundaries; metropolitan/urban agglomeration areas are significantly larger (e.g., Greater Tunis exceeds 2.5 million).

Rank	City	Population (2024 census)	Governorate
1	Tunis	604,599	Tunis
2	Sfax	273,506	Sfax
3	Sousse	240,321	Sousse
4	Kairouan	172,788	Kairouan
5	La Soukra	159,862	Ariana
6	Raoued	141,471	Ariana
7	Sidi Hassine	129,888	Tunis
8	El Mourouj	121,712	Ben Arous
9	Mnihla	116,327	Ariana
10	Bizerte	142,000 (aligned with 2024 census trends)	Bizerte

Note: Figures are from the 2024 RGPH census (municipal level); some (e.g., Bizerte) use aligned estimates where exact commune data is aggregated differently. Full INS commune breakdowns are in governorate reports on ins.tn. For metropolitan views, sources like World Population Review report larger figures (e.g., Tunis metro ~2.58 million in 2026 projections).

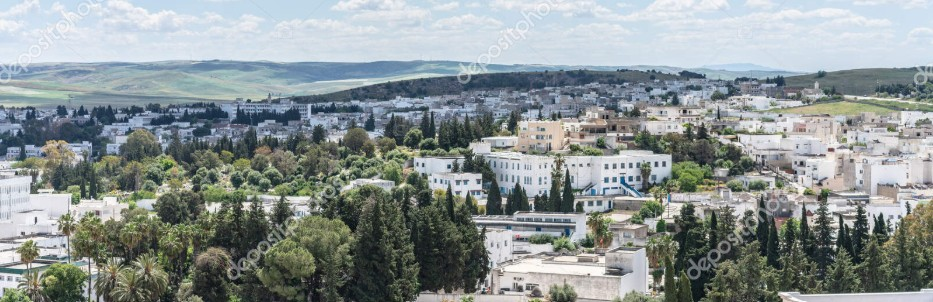
Beja

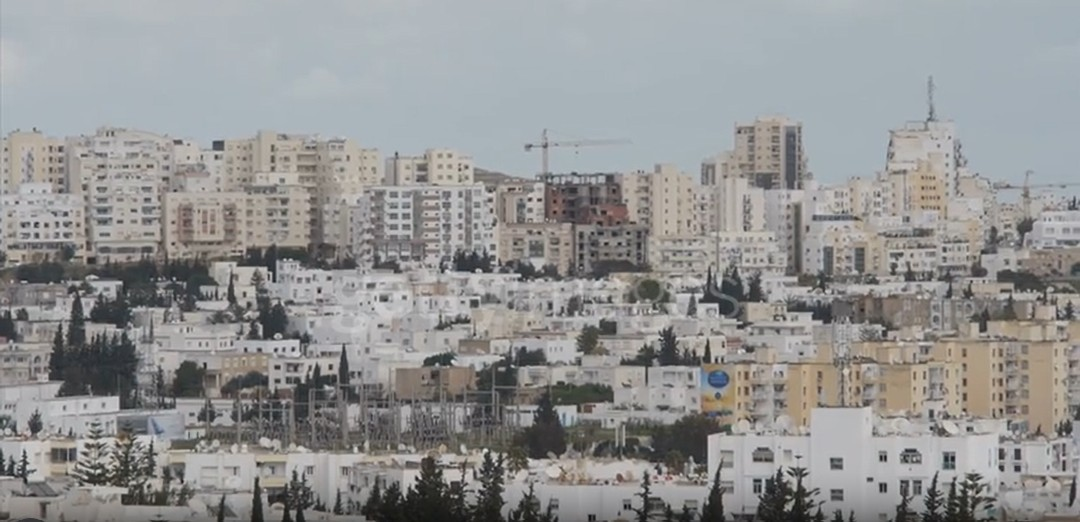
Ariana

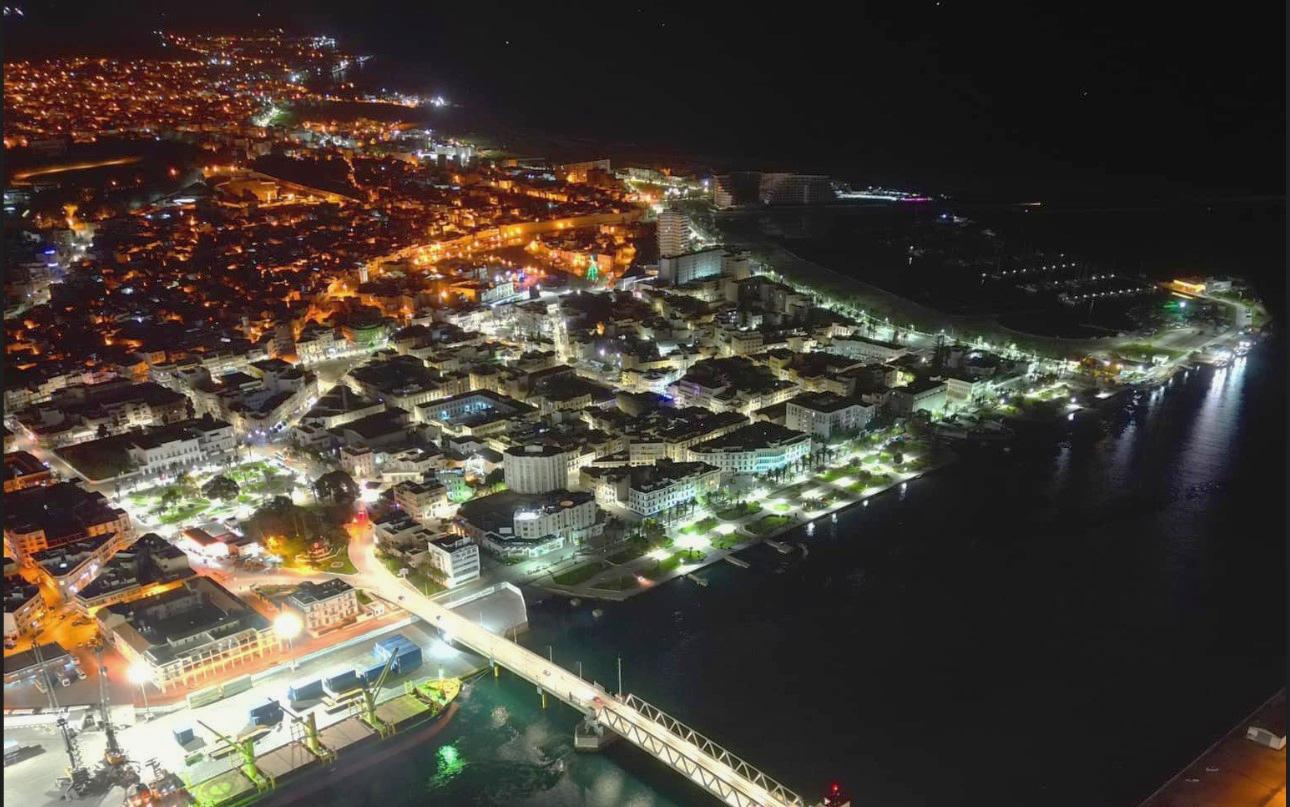
Bizerte

== List of municipalities by governorate ==
This is a list of all municipalities of Tunisia with their respective population per the General Population and Housing Census (RGPH) 2024.

Governorate	Code	Municipality	Population (2024)
Tunis	1111	**Tunis**	604,599
Tunis	1112	Le Bardo	68,799
Tunis	1113	Le Kram	88,302
Tunis	1114	La Goulette	48,382
Tunis	1115	Carthage	17,215
Tunis	1116	Sidi Bou Said	4,988
Tunis	1117	La Marsa	113,133
Tunis	1118	Sidi Hassine	129,888
Ariana	1211	**Ariana**	109,693
Ariana	1212	La Soukra	159,862
Ariana	1213	Raoued	141,471
Ariana	1214	Kalâat el-Andalous	32,520
Ariana	1215	Sidi Thabet	29,546
Ariana	1216	**Ettadhamen**	79,133
Ariana	1217	**Mnihla**	116,327
Ben Arous	1311	**Ben Arous**	89,571
Ben Arous	1312	El Mourouj	121,712
Ben Arous	1313	Hammam Lif	41,738
Ben Arous	1314	Hammam Chott	34,341
Ben Arous	1315	Bou Mhel el-Bassatine	50,817
Ben Arous	1316	Ezzahra	35,241
Ben Arous	1317	Radès	63,042
Ben Arous	1318	Mégrine	25,863
Ben Arous	1319	Mohamedia	84,465
Ben Arous	1320	Mornag	52,276
Ben Arous	1321	Khalidia	22,894
Ben Arous	1322	Fouchana	66,483
Ben Arous	1323	Naassen	34,385
Manouba	1411	**Manouba**	37,287
Manouba	1412	Den Den	25,658
Manouba	1413	Douar Hicher	88,335
Manouba	1414	Oued Ellil	81,040
Manouba	1415	Mornaguia	31,296
Manouba	1416	Borj El Amri	21,465
Manouba	1417	Djedeida	52,713
Manouba	1418	Tebourba	46,074
Manouba	1419	El Battan	21,018
Nabeul	1511	**Nabeul**	72,776
Nabeul	1512	Dar Châabane El Fehri	51,174
Nabeul	1513	Béni Khiar	28,749
Nabeul	1514	El Maâmoura	9,224
Nabeul	1515	Somâa	9,548
Nabeul	1516	Korba	63,769
Nabeul	1517	Tazarka	10,294
Nabeul	1518	Menzel Temime	62,491
Nabeul	1519	Menzel Horr	9,613
Nabeul	1520	El Mida	29,179
Nabeul	1521	Kelibia	59,315
Nabeul	1522	Azmour	7,604
Nabeul	1523	Hammam Ghezèze	10,449
Nabeul	1524	Dar Allouch	6,829
Nabeul	1525	El Haouaria	28,813
Nabeul	1526	Takelsa	24,805
Nabeul	1527	Soliman	51,574
Nabeul	1528	Korbous	4,116
Nabeul	1529	Menzel Bouzelfa	39,839
Nabeul	1530	Béni Khalled	29,917
Nabeul	1531	Zaouiet Djedidi	12,018
Nabeul	1532	Grombalia	48,582
Nabeul	1533	Bou Argoub	35,243
Nabeul	1534	Hammamet	83,369
Nabeul		Fondouk Jedid - Seltene	27,273
Nabeul		Chrifet - Boucharray	16,530
Nabeul		Sidi Djedidi	12,812
Nabeul		Tazougrane - Boukrim - Zaouiet El Mgaies	17,267
Zaghouan	1611	**Zaghouan**	43,813
Zaghouan	1612	Zriba	27,849
Zaghouan	1613	Bir Mcherga	16,284
Zaghouan	1614	Djebel Oust	10,999
Zaghouan	1615	El Fahs	37,652
Zaghouan	1616	Nadhour	37,130
Zaghouan		El Amaiem	13,562
Zaghouan		Saouaf	13,776
Bizerte	1711	**Bizerte**	186,033
Bizerte	1712	Sejnane	21,974
Bizerte	1713	Mateur	49,316
Bizerte	1714	Menzel Bourguiba	60,356
Bizerte	1715	Tinja	21,995
Bizerte	1716	Ghar al Milh	10,630
Bizerte	1717	Aousja	11,637
Bizerte	1718	Menzel Jemil	32,918
Bizerte	1719	Menzel Abderrahmane	24,092
Bizerte	1720	El Alia	29,322
Bizerte	1721	Ras Jebel	36,645
Bizerte	1722	Metline	13,093
Bizerte	1723	Raf Raf	14,193
Bizerte		El Hachachna	19,145
Bizerte		Ghezala	25,366
Bizerte		Joumine	27,896
Bizerte		Utique	22,777
Béja	2111	**Béja**	86,890
Béja	2112	El Maâgoula	16,477
Béja	2113	Zahret Medien	21,403
Béja	2114	Nefza	25,815
Béja	2115	Téboursouk	21,414
Béja	2116	Testour	27,453
Béja	2117	Goubellat	16,767
Béja	2118	Medjez El Bab	44,879
Béja		Ouchtata - Jmila	21,758
Béja		Sidi Ismaïl	9,975
Béja		Slouguia	8,048
Béja		Thibar	10,538
Jendouba	2211	**Jendouba**	109,173
Jendouba	2212	Bou Salem	45,959
Jendouba	2213	Tabarka	35,052
Jendouba	2214	Aïn Draham	20,938
Jendouba	2215	Fernana	28,202
Jendouba	2216	Beni M'Tir	5,239
Jendouba	2217	Ghardimaou	49,612
Jendouba	2218	Oued Melliz	17,334
Jendouba		Jouaouda	14,476
Jendouba		Souk Sebt	12,856
Jendouba		Kalaa - Maaden - Farksan	12,701
Jendouba		Khmairia	11,368
Jendouba		Aïn Sobh - Nadhour	13,836
Jendouba		Balta - Bou Aouane	27,606
Kef	2311	**El Kef**	67,039
Kef	2312	Nebeur	12,987
Kef	2313	Touiref	5,863
Kef	2314	Sakiet Sidi Youssef	16,173
Kef	2315	Tajerouine	25,742
Kef	2316	Menzel Salem	1,370
Kef	2317	Kalaat Senan	13,517
Kef	2318	Kalâat Khasba	5,663
Kef	2319	Jérissa	8,613
Kef	2320	El Ksour	14,686
Kef	2321	Dahmani	25,285
Kef	2322	Sers	17,730
Kef		Bahra	5,664
Kef		El Marja	5,294
Kef		Zaafrane - Dir Kef	12,060
Siliana	2411	**Siliana**	46,204
Siliana	2412	Bou Arada	19,373
Siliana	2413	Gaâfour	15,801
Siliana	2414	El Krib	20,000
Siliana	2415	Sidi Bou Rouis	11,655
Siliana	2416	Maktar	28,321
Siliana	2417	Rouhia	20,357
Siliana	2418	Kesra	15,031
Siliana	2419	Bargou	11,505
Siliana	2420	El Aroussa	8,839
Siliana		El Hababsa	6,706
Siliana		Sidi Morched	12,550
Sousse	3111	**Sousse**	240,321
Sousse	3112	Ksibet Thrayet	15,497
Sousse	3113	Ezzouhour	18,589
Sousse	3114	Zaouiet Sousse	33,633
Sousse	3115	Hammam Sousse	48,899
Sousse	3116	Akouda	30,568
Sousse	3117	Kalâa Kebira	67,108
Sousse	3118	Sidi Bou Ali	20,647
Sousse	3119	Hergla	10,652
Sousse	3120	Enfidha	35,246
Sousse	3121	Bouficha	36,094
Sousse	3122	Sidi El Hani	14,508
Sousse	3123	M'saken	82,429
Sousse	3124	Kalâa Seghira	45,743
Sousse	3125	Messaadine	14,883
Sousse	3126	Kondar	15,491
Sousse		Chott Meriem	8,606
Sousse		Grimet - Hicher	23,367
Monastir	3211	**Monastir**	97,457
Monastir	3212	Khniss	12,627
Monastir	3213	Ouerdanine	22,690
Monastir	3214	Sahline Moôtmar	23,088
Monastir	3215	Sidi Ameur	9,397
Monastir	3216	Zéramdine	17,129
Monastir	3217	Beni Hassen	9,117
Monastir	3218	Ghenada	6,113
Monastir	3219	Jemmal	54,469
Monastir	3220	Menzel Kamel	8,639
Monastir	3221	Zaouiet Kontoch	8,050
Monastir	3222	Bembla-Mnara	16,664
Monastir	3223	Menzel Ennour	13,716
Monastir	3224	El Masdour	5,696
Monastir	3225	Moknine	61,295
Monastir	3226	Sidi Bennour	4,563
Monastir	3227	Menzel Fersi	3,879
Monastir	3228	Amiret El Fhoul	6,074
Monastir	3229	Amiret Touazra	7,468
Monastir	3230	Amiret Hajjaj	9,893
Monastir	3231	Cherahil	4,483
Monastir	3232	Bekalta	19,091
Monastir	3233	Téboulba	41,049
Monastir	3234	Ksar Hellal	55,505
Monastir	3235	Ksibet El Mediouni	13,867
Monastir	3236	Bennane Bodheur	17,935
Monastir	3237	Touza	9,273
Monastir	3238	Sayada	13,354
Monastir	3239	Lemta	6,104
Monastir	3240	Bouhjar	7,481
Monastir	3241	Menzel Hayet	13,603
Mahdia	3311	**Mahdia**	60,352
Mahdia	3312	Rejiche	11,603
Mahdia	3313	Bou Merdes	17,089
Mahdia	3314	Ouled Chamekh	23,893
Mahdia	3315	Chorbane	29,059
Mahdia	3316	Hebira	11,617
Mahdia	3317	Essouassi	34,619
Mahdia	3318	El Djem	38,413
Mahdia	3319	Kerker	19,559
Mahdia	3320	Chebba	31,137
Mahdia	3321	Melloulèche	23,890
Mahdia	3322	Sidi Alouane	27,654
Mahdia	3323	Ksour Essef	38,567
Mahdia	3324	El Bradâa	13,659
Mahdia		El Hekaima	14,152
Mahdia		Sidi Zid - Awled Moulahem	24,064
Mahdia		Tlelsa	17,563
Mahdia		Zelba	12,654
Sfax	3411	**Sfax**	273,506
Sfax	3412	Sakiet Ezzit	66,634
Sfax	3413	Chihia	30,014
Sfax	3414	Sakiet Eddaïer	52,901
Sfax	3415	Gremda	49,140
Sfax	3416	El Aïn	44,258
Sfax	3417	Thyna	53,349
Sfax	3418	Agareb	46,652
Sfax	3419	Jebiniana	36,407
Sfax	3420	El Hencha	37,041
Sfax	3421	Menzel Chaker	22,004
Sfax	3422	Ghraïba	16,678
Sfax	3423	Bir Ali Ben Khalifa	32,383
Sfax	3424	Skhira	40,035
Sfax	3425	Mahares	35,698
Sfax	3426	Kerkennah	15,382
Sfax		El Achech	20,542
Sfax		El Amra	35,808
Sfax		El Nasr	18,393
Sfax		Hadjeb	26,412
Sfax		Hazeg - Ellouza	21,957
Sfax		Nadhour - Sidi Ali Ben Abed	22,956
Sfax		Ouabed - Khazanet	49,318
Sfax		Sfax (suburbs/other aggregations if separate)	N/A
Kairouan	4111	**Kairouan**	172,788
Kairouan	4112	Chebika	21,799
Kairouan	4113	Sbikha	42,533
Kairouan	4114	Oueslatia	26,454
Kairouan	4115	Aïn Djeloula	6,441
Kairouan	4116	Haffouz	29,207
Kairouan	4117	El Alâa	28,897
Kairouan	4118	Hajeb El Ayoun	26,455
Kairouan	4119	Nasrallah	20,310
Kairouan	4120	Menzel Mehiri	12,680
Kairouan	4121	Echrarda	14,361
Kairouan	4122	Bou Hajla	71,836
Kairouan		Raqqada	25,741
Kairouan		Chraitia - Ksour	11,215
Kairouan		Sisseb - Driaat	35,117
Kairouan		Jehina	10,090
Kairouan		Aïn El Beïdha	15,285
Kairouan		Chaouachi	14,200
Kairouan		Abida	15,394
Kasserine	4211	**Kasserine**	83,534
Kasserine	4212	Sbeitla	24,597
Kasserine	4213	Sbiba	6,504
Kasserine	4214	Jedelienne	4,352
Kasserine	4215	Thala	18,230
Kasserine	4216	Haïdra	3,451
Kasserine	4217	Foussana	7,703
Kasserine	4218	Fériana	29,572
Kasserine	4219	Thélepte	6,932
Kasserine	4220	Magel Bel Abbès	6,471
Sidi Bouzid	4311	**Sidi Bouzid**	96,003
Sidi Bouzid	4312	Jilma	45,219
Sidi Bouzid	4313	Cebbala Ouled Asker	20,382
Sidi Bouzid	4314	Bir El Hafey	38,288
Sidi Bouzid	4315	Sidi Ali Ben Aoun	18,556
Sidi Bouzid	4316	Menzel Bouzaiane	7,113
Sidi Bouzid	4317	Meknassy	14,773
Sidi Bouzid	4318	Mezzouna	27,748
Sidi Bouzid	4319	Regueb	48,925
Sidi Bouzid	4320	Ouled Haffouz	2,494
Sidi Bouzid		Souk Jedid	22,593
Sidi Bouzid		Sidi Bouzid Ouest (sub-municipal)	72,511
Sidi Bouzid		Sidi Bouzid Est	57,961
Sidi Bouzid		El Hichria	15,114
Sidi Bouzid		Other delegations/municipalities (e.g., Regueb sub-areas)	Aggregated in source
Sidi Bouzid		Baten Ghzal	48,925
Sidi Bouzid		Additional post-reform (e.g., Souk Jedid sub)	22,600
Sidi Bouzid		Final aggregate	489,991
Gabès	5111	**Gabès**	101,042
Gabès	5112	Chenini Nahal	14,803
Gabès	5113	Ghannouch	28,051
Gabès	5114	Métouia	13,613
Gabès	5115	Oudhref	17,931
Gabès	5116	El Hamma	57,856
Gabès	5117	Matmata	1,847
Gabès	5118	Nouvelle Matmata	7,526
Gabès	5119	Mareth	57,358
Gabès	5120	Zarat	5,627
Gabès	5121	Teboulbou	21,727
Gabès	5122	Habib Thameur Bouatouch	19,320
Gabès	5123	Kettana	13,310
Gabès	5124	Bouchemma	12,182
Gabès	5125	Dkhilet Toujane	10,277
Gabès	5126	Menzel El Habib	10,148
Medenine	5211	**Medenine**	120,712
Medenine	5212	Beni Khedache	2,930
Medenine	5213	Ben Gardane	90,504
Medenine	5214	Zarzis	75,382
Medenine	5215	Houmt El Souk (Djerba)	80,000+
Medenine	5216	Midoun (Djerba)	74,437
Medenine	5217	Ajim (Djerba)	24,294
Medenine		Sidi Makhlouf	28,444
Tataouine	5311	**Tataouine**	95,892
Tataouine	5312	Bir Lahmar	10,772
Tataouine	5313	Ghomrassen	16,351
Tataouine	5314	Dehiba	5,920
Tataouine	5315	Remada	9,964
Tataouine		Smâr	8,080
Gafsa	6111	**Gafsa**	129,931
Gafsa	6112	El Ksar	23,806
Gafsa	6113	Moularès (Oum El Araies)	31,767
Gafsa	6114	Redeyef	31,421
Gafsa	6115	Métlaoui	44,547
Gafsa	6116	Mdhila	16,883
Gafsa	6117	El Guettar	20,784
Gafsa	6118	Sened	23,633
Gafsa		Belkhir	15,923
Gafsa		Lalla	16,125
Gafsa		Sidi Aïch	12,029
Gafsa		Sidi Boubaker	5,402
Gafsa		Zannouch	16,525
Gafsa		[[Other (if aggregated)] ]	N/A
Tozeur	6211	**Tozeur**	50,362
Tozeur	6212	Degache	24,426
Tozeur	6213	El Hamma du Jérid	7,895
Tozeur	6214	Nafta	24,263
Tozeur	6215	Tamerza	6,904
Tozeur		Hazoua	6,186
Kebili	6311	**Kebili**	50,016
Kebili	6312	Djemna	7,815
Kebili	6313	Douz	46,135
Kebili	6314	El Golâa	9,095
Kebili	6315	Souk Lahad	21,069
Kebili		Bechli - Blidet - Jerssin	14,787
Kebili		Bechri - Fatnassa	9,760
Kebili		Faouar	19,875
Kebili		Rjim Maatoug	4,649

== See also ==
- Urbanization in Tunisia
- List of cities by country
- Governorates of Tunisia
- List of metropolitan areas in Africa
- List of largest cities in the Arab world
