= Amiret Touazra =

Coordinates: 35°29′51″N 10°45′43″E

- Commune and town
- Interactive map of Amiret Touazra
- Country: Tunisia
- Governorate: Monastir Governorate

Area
  - Total: 30.409 sq mi (78.760 km^{2})

Population (2014)
  - Total: 6,261
- Time zone: UTC+1 (CET)

Amiret Touazra (Arabic: عميرة التوازرة) is a town and commune in the Monastir Governorate, Tunisia. It had 6,261 inhabitants in 2014.

== Geographical location ==
Amiret Touazra is located in the eastern center of Tunisia and is administratively affiliated with the Monastir Governorate. It is bordered to the north by Beni Hassen and Al Ghnada, by Amiret El Fhoul to the south, and by Boumerdes and Amiret El Hojjaj to the east and west. It consists of two pillars: the northern parity and the southern parallel, and 14 residential neighborhoods.

The city has been urbanized since 1999. Of this, 145.5 hectares are designated for housing. The current area covers 29.5 hectares and covers three major neighborhoods: Al Houichet (Arabic: الهويشات), Al Smiret (Arabic: السميرات) and Al Khor (Arabic: الخور).

== See also ==
- List of cities in Tunisia
