= Dar Allouch =

- Commune and town
- Location within Tunisia
- Coordinates: 36.9719°N 11.0526°E
- Country: Tunisia
- Governorate: Nabeul Governorate

Government
  - Mayor: Mehdi Cherif (Independent)

Population (2020)
  - Total: 10,053
- Time zone: UTC+1 (CET)
- Postal code: 8055

Dar Allouch (Arabic:دار علوش) is a Tunisian town located at the northeastern end of the Cape Bon peninsula, at the entrance to the Gulf of Tunis. It is located 129 kilometers from Tunis and 80 kilometers from the Pantelleria. Administratively attached to the governorate of Nabeul and to the delegation of Hammam El Ghzez, it is the center of a municipality with 10,053 inhabitants in 2020. The municipality was created by the decree of April 2, 1966. It is a wonderful place to live, as it is quiet and there is less noise than one usually finds in cities, and it is visited by a good number of tourists from both inside and outside the city. Tunisia. What sets the city apart is the multiplicity of its features, where there is a clear and pure sea next to the city and the forest of Dar Chisho. It is also characterized by a large number of factories (tomatoes, tuna, sugar, oil ...) which cater for the needs of all of Tunisia, and it is known for its abundant agricultural production since most of its inhabitants practice agriculture, which is one of their most important resources.

As for the recreational tourism side, with its clear and pure beaches and its forest (Dar Shisho Forest), which is the destination of many tourists every year for swimming and camping, in addition to the archaeological sites (Karkouen) dating from the Punic period time. It is also known as summer overcrowding in terms of demand from foreign tourists as well as domestic tourism. Dar Allouch has a sandy and pebble beach, which is considered one of the most beautiful Tunisian beaches. It stretches for about 3 km from "Beit El Assa" ، "بيت العسة" to "Al Maqtaouat" ، " المقطوعات "passing by" Ain Taqardoush "،" عين تاقاردوش ". It is considered the Pearl of Cape Bon.

== See also ==
- List of cities in Tunisia
