= Bennane-Bodher =

- Municipality
- Country: Tunisia
- Governorate: Monastir

Population (2014)
  - Total: 14,218
- Time zone: UTC+1 (CET)

Bennane-Bodher is a municipality in Monastir Governorate, Tunisia. It consists of the town of Bennane and the village of Bodher, both belonging to the Ksibet El Mediouni Delegation.
