= Bennane =

Coordinates: 35°41′N 10°50′E

- Town
- Interactive map of Bennane
- Country: Tunisia
- Governorate: Monastir
- Delegation: Ksibet El Mediouni
- Municipality: Bennane-Bodher

Government

Population (2022)
  - Total: 15,792
- Time zone: UTC+1 (CET)
- Postal code: 5025

Bennane is a town in Monastir Governorate, Tunisia. Governed by the joint municipality of Bennane-Bodher, it belongs to the Ksibet El Mediouni Delegation.

== See also ==
- List of cities in Tunisia
