= Zaouiet Djedidi =

Coordinates: 36°39′N 10°35′E

Zaouiet Djedidi زاوية الجديدي
- Commune and town
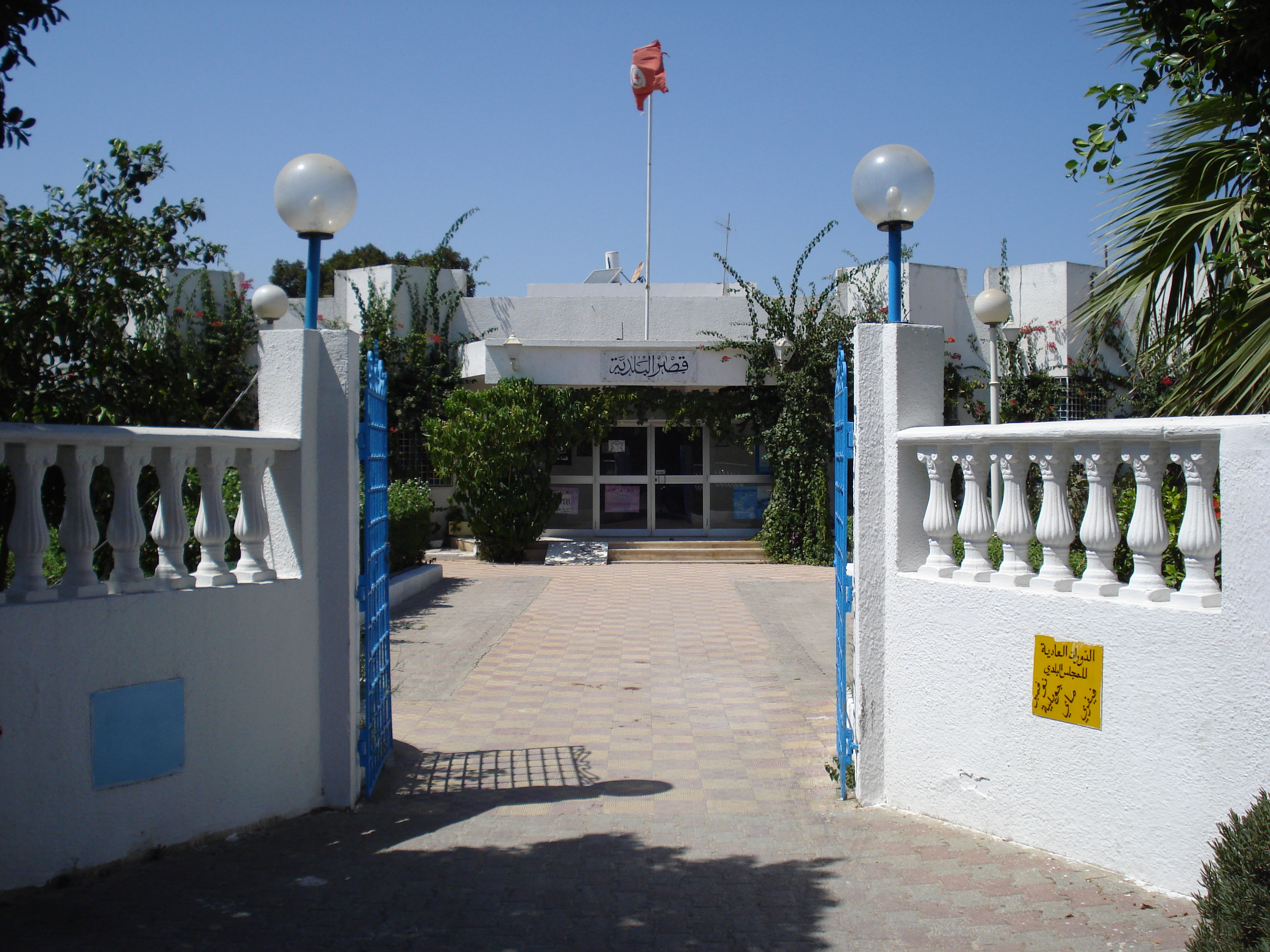
- Interactive map of Zaouiet Djedidi
- Country: Tunisia
- Governorate: Nabeul Governorate

Population (2014)
  - Total: 7,862
- Time zone: UTC+1 (CET)

Zaouiet Djedidi is a town and commune in the Nabeul Governorate, Tunisia. As of 2004 it had a population of 7,370.

== Population ==
2014 Census (Municipal)
Homes	Families	Males	Females	Total
2276	1949	3881	4005	7886

== See also ==
- List of cities in Tunisia
