= Sidi Bennour, Tunisia =

Sidi Bennour
- Commune and town
- Location within Tunisia
- Coordinates: 35°31′48″N 10°54′36″E
- Country: Tunisia
- Governorate: Monastir Governorate

Population (2014)
  - Total: 4,520
- Time zone: UTC+1 (CET)

Sidi Bennour is a town and commune in the Monastir Governorate, Tunisia.

== See also ==
- List of cities in Tunisia
