= Abdelhamid Slama =

Tunisian politician (1941–2025)

Personal details
- Born: 23 October 1941 Ksibet El Mediouni, French protectorate of Tunisia
- Died: 31 January 2025 (aged 83)

Abdelhamid Slama (23 October 1941 – 31 January 2025) was a Tunisian politician. He was Minister of Sport, Youth, and Physical Education.

== Life and career ==
Abdelhamid Slama was born on 23 October 1941 in Ksibet El Mediouni, Tunisia. He held a PhD in Arabic literature.

Slama taught in Sousse and in Tunis, then worked for the Ministry of Education, the Ministry of Youth and Sports, and the Ministry of Information. He was also a board member of the Constitutional Democratic Rally.

Slama died on 31 January 2025, at the age of 83.
