= Skander Tej =

Tunisian painter (born 1981)

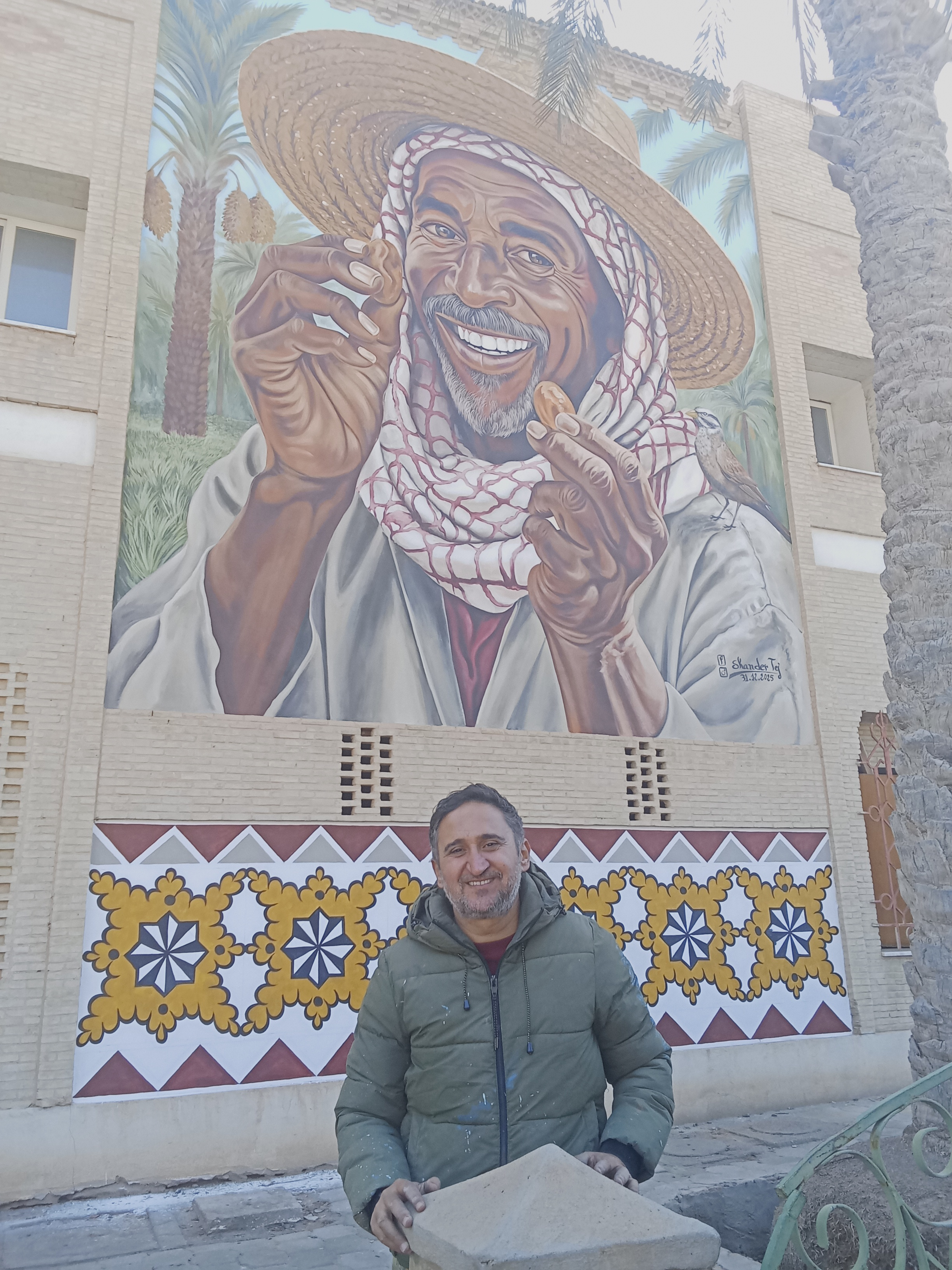
- Born: Skander Tej; 1981 (age 44–45); Beni Hassen, Tunisia
- Known for: Painting, Graphic art, Street art

Skander Tej (born 4 May 1981) is a Tunisian visual artist, graphic designer, and street artist, recognized for his contributions to mural art. He is particularly known for creating works that address environmental themes.

Tej was born in Monastir.

== Style and subject ==
His work explores the connections between art, culture, and the environment. His murals and land art installations, such as those he has created in Djerba and the Kerkennah Islands, address social and ecological themes.

Executed in places such as schools and hospitals, his works combine traditional craftsmanship with modern technology, blending art with community engagement, as exemplified by the project "24 Villages, 24 Governorates".

== Works ==
In 2024, he created a mural at the Marina of Monastir as part of a cultural event. He has participated in festivals including Street Art City in Lurcy-Lévis, painted street art in Jbal Jloud, a poor neighbourhood in Tunis, has painted murals in Tunis and in a school. In 2025, the Cirta Cultural Space in Kef commissioned him to create a large mural aimed at raising public awareness about environmental preservation.

In the same year, he also took part in a meeting organized by the Alliance française in Tunis on the theme "Art, Street, and Social Transformation" and led street art workshops in Aïn Draham.

== Gallery ==
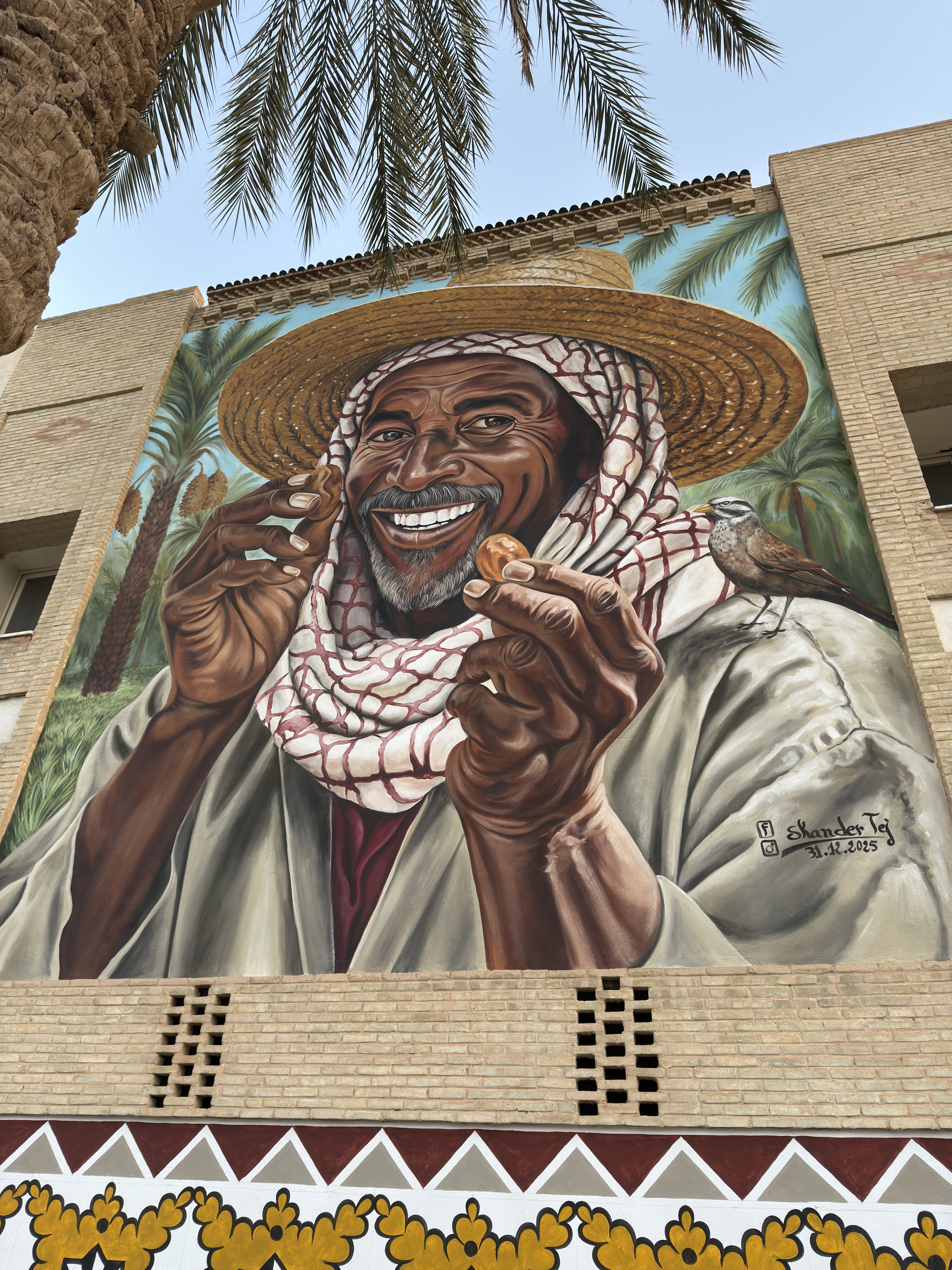
Mural in Tozeur, International Festival of Plastic Arts of the Djerid (2025).
