= El Maâmoura =

Coordinates: 36°28′N 10°48′E

El Maâmoura المعمورة
- Commune and town
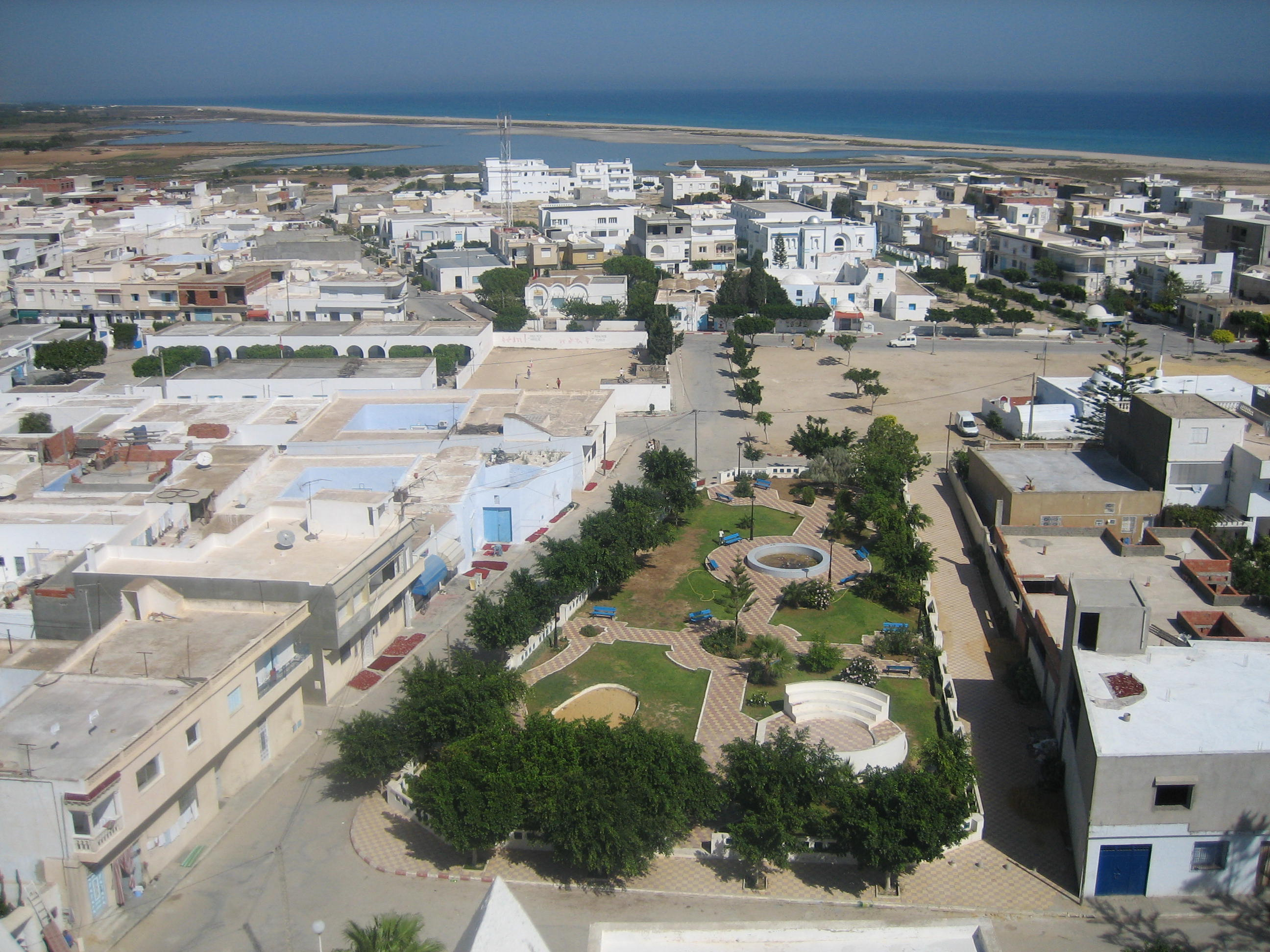

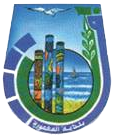
- Seal
- Interactive map of El Maâmoura
- Country: Tunisia
- Governorate: Nabeul Governorate

Population (2014)
  - Total: 8,039
- Time zone: UTC+1 (CET)

El Maâmoura is a town and commune located in the peninsula of Cap Bon in the Nabeul Governorate, Tunisia. In 2004, it had a population of 6,619.

The city took its name from a nearby cape, Ras Maâmoura, though the town is mostly famous with tourists for its long beach sandy beach.

An extensive salt march of 94 ha, the Sebkhet Sidi Ahmed Ben Daoued is, with a string of 3 other ones stretching to the North of Korba, part of a 504 ha protected ecosystem classified as RAMSAR site TN 014 and an Important Bird Area (IBO) by BirdLife.

Every summer, the city hosts a multicultural festival called Festival of Sidi Ben Daoud.

The municipality of Maamoura is known for collaboration with civil society organizations.

== Etymology ==
The name Maâmoura is derived from the verb to "inhabit" or to "live", and therefore means "the land or the place inhabited". According to Al Idrissi, in his book of descriptive geography the Tabula Rogeriana, the city was formerly known as "Tussihan" or "Ksar (=castle) Tussihan".

== History ==
According to Lucette Valensi, a historian specializing in Mediterranean culture, in her book Fellahs Tunisiens (Tunisian Farmers), three men would have founded Maamoura 800 years ago: two Moroccans men and one man from Mecca named Baâtout. Thus, most of Maâmoura's inhabitants would be descendants of these men. To this day, "Baâtout" remains a common last name in this town.

== Presentation of the town hall ==
Maâmoura was given the legal status of municipality on May 3, 1966.

Mayors since 1966

- Sadok Makhlouf (Professor): 1966 to 1969

- Habib Makhlouf (Teacher): 1969 to 1972

- Abdelhamid Ben Slimène (Lawyer): 1972 to 1975

- Daoud Issa (Engineer): 1975 to 1980

- Rashid Zayani (Teacher): 1980 to 1990

- Abdelhamid Baâtout (General Inspector of Education): 1990 to 2005

- Tahar Ben Slimène (Surgeon): 2005 to 2010

== Population ==
2014 Census (Municipal)
Homes	Families	Males	Females	Total
3219	2122	4153	3886	8039

== See also ==
- List of cities in Tunisia
