= Menzel Farsi =

Coordinates: 35°32′24″N 10°52′12″E

Menzel Farsi منزل فارسي
- Commune and town
- Interactive map of Menzel Farsi
- Country: Tunisia
- Governorate: Monastir Governorate

Population (2014)
  - Total: 3,603
- Time zone: UTC+1 (CET)

Menzel Farsi (formerly known as Sidi Al-Nuajia) is a town and municipality in the Monastir Governorate, Tunisia.

== See also ==
- List of cities in Tunisia
