= Cherahil =

Coordinates: 35°30′N 10°51′E

Cherahil شراحيل
- Commune and town
- Interactive map of Cherahil
- Country: Tunisia
- Governorate: Monastir Governorate

Population (2014)
  - Total: 4,406
- Time zone: UTC+1 (CET)

Cherahil is a town and commune in the Monastir Governorate, Tunisia.

== See also ==
- List of cities in Tunisia
