= Menzel Horr =

Coordinates: 36°44′N 10°57′E

Menzel Horr منزل حر
- Commune and town
- Interactive map of Menzel Horr
- Country: Tunisia
- Governorate: Nabeul Governorate

Population (2014)
  - Total: 5,243
- Time zone: UTC+1 (CET)

Menzel Horr is a town and commune in the Nabeul Governorate, Tunisia. As of 2004 it had a population of 4,798.

== See also ==
- List of cities in Tunisia
