= Sahline Moôtmar =

- Commune and town
- Location within Tunisia
- Coordinates: 35°45′2″N 10°42′44″E
- Country: Tunisia
- Governorate: Monastir Governorate

Population (2022)
  - Total: 21,533
- Time zone: UTC+1 (CET)

Sahline Moôtmar is a town and commune in the Monastir Governorate, Tunisia.

== See also ==
- List of cities in Tunisia
