= Sbiba =

- Location in Tunisia
- Coordinates: 35°32′48″N 9°4′25″E
- Country: Tunisia
- Governorate: Kasserine Governorate

Area
- 0.86 sq mi (2.23 km^{2})

Population (2014)
  - Total: 6,513
- Time zone: UTC1 (CET)
- Postal code: 1270
- Website: Sbiba Official Website

Sbiba (Arabic: سبيبة) is a city surrounded by chains of mountains in the province of Kasserine.

Sbiba is in the Midwest of Tunisia on the latitude of 35° and 36°, about 70 km far from Kasserine, bounded on the north with Jedelienne, Sbeitla to the South. Sbiba was founded by the Romans. German forces defeated United States forces in the vicinity of Sbiba in an early part of the Tunisian campaign in World War II.

== History ==
In the book Al-Istibsar fi 'agaib al-Amsar, written in the late 12th century, the author described it as:

"An ancient and timeless city, with flowing rivers and running waters that drive the mills. It was once a place of great significance, abundant in cultivated lands and thriving villages. [..] No land in Ifriqiya was more fertile than this, nor more abundant in orchards, fruits, and flowing springs. The city has a great and magnificent spring, built in ancient times by the early peoples."

== Geography ==
The city is located at the site of the ancient city of Sufes at the altitude of 630m. By the city is located the Mount Jbel Mghuila which is the highest peak in the region with 1370m.

== Economy ==
The city is famous for its apples, tomatoes and fresh water. Sbiba produces nearly 40% of the Tunisian total production of apples and tomatoes due to its very advanced system of irrigation. Despite its population of around 55,000, Sbiba suffers from a lack of national and international investments in the fields of industry, agriculture and especially services.
