= Sidi Ameur, Tunisia =

Sidi Ameur is a city of the Tunisian Sahel located at 35° 45'n, 10° 42'e on the Mediterranean coast near Sahline, a few kilometers west of Monastir. The Mayor is Mustapha Attig

It is in the Monastir Governorate, and forms a municipality with Mesjed-Aïssa. This has 8 404 inhabitants in 2014. and depends on the delegation of Sahline. Its name comes from Zaouia Sidi Ameur El Mzoughi, a 15th century Muslim holy man of Morocco whose shrine attracts pilgrims yearly mostly from Sfax. The ceremonies, organized during Eid al-Kebir, are punctuated with mystic songs .
