= Bouhjar =

Coordinates: 35°40′48″N 10°51′36″E

Bouhjar بوحجر
- Commune and town
- Interactive map of Bouhjar
- Country: Tunisia
- Governorate: Monastir Governorate

Government
  - Mayor: Abdelwaheb Mhamdi (Afek Tounes)

Population (2022)
  - Total: 6,492
- Time zone: UTC+1 (CET)

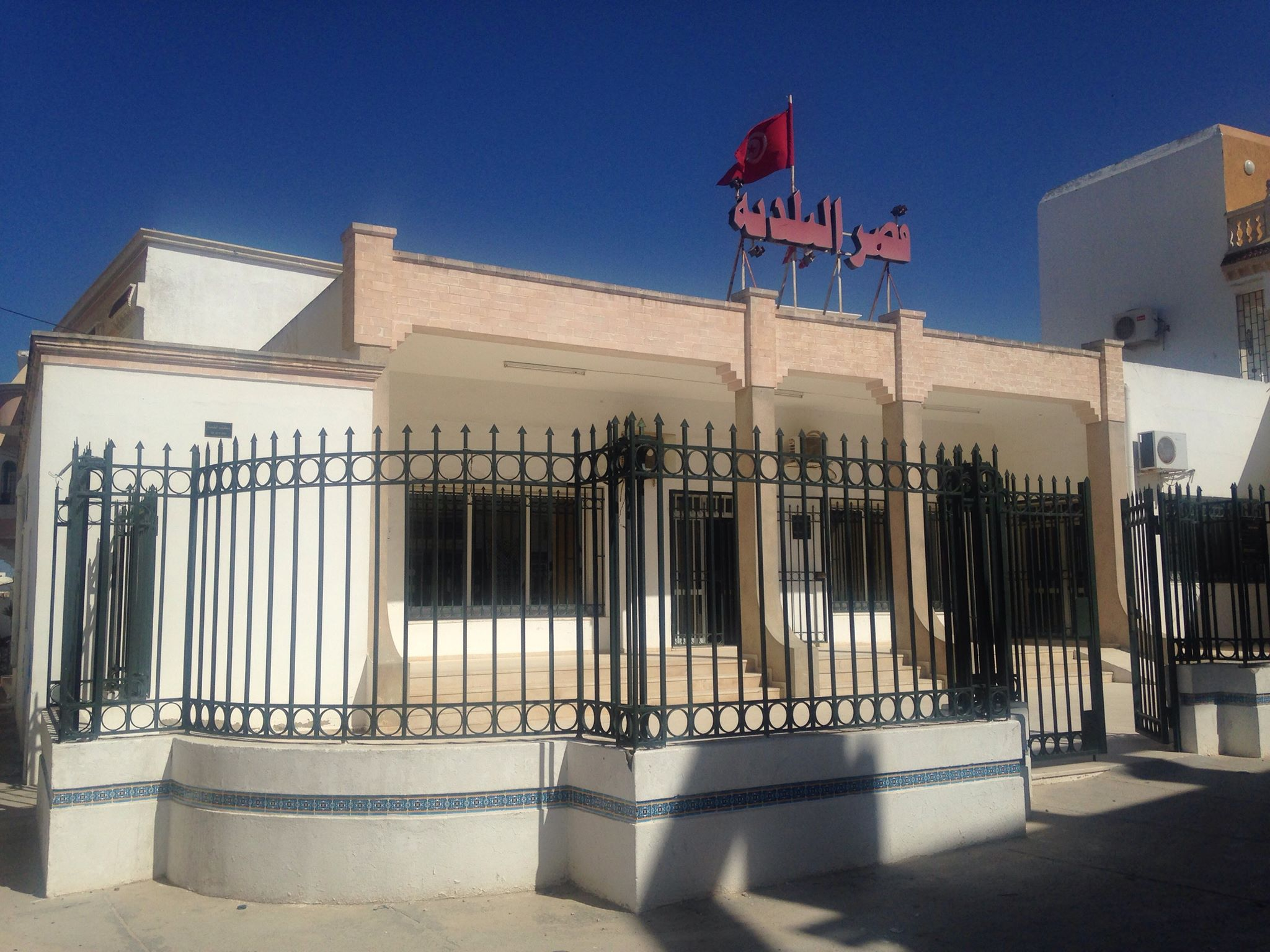
Bouhjar city hall

Bouhjar is a town and commune in the Monastir Governorate, Tunisia.

In 2019 German company PSZ electronic GmbH constructed an electronic cable facility in Bouhjar at a cost of US $108 million.

== See also ==
- List of cities in Tunisia
