= Menzel Bouzelfa =

Menzel Bouzelfa منزل بوزلفى
- Commune and town
- Nickname: Capital of Citrus (Capitale des agrumes)
- Location of Menzel Bouzelfa in Tunisia
- Coordinates: 36°41′00″N 10°35′00″E
- Country: Tunisia
- Governorate: Nabeul Governorate
- Delegation: Menzel Bouzelfa Delegation

Area
  - Total: 133.8 km^{2} (51.7 sq mi)

Population (2023)
  - Total: 41,455
  - Density: 309.8/km^{2} (802.5/sq mi)
- Time zone: UTC+1 (CET)
- Postal code: 8010
- Website: commune-menzelbouzelfa.gov.tn

Menzel Bouzelfa (منزل بوزلفى) is a town and commune located in the Nabeul Governorate, situated at the entry of the Cap Bon peninsula in northeastern Tunisia, approximately 40 kilometers northeast of Tunis and 50 kilometers north of Nabeul. Widely recognized as the "Capital of Citrus" (Capitale des agrumes), the town serves as a major regional agricultural hub. As of 2023, the municipality reached a total population of 41,455 inhabitants.

== Recent Events ==
=== 2026 Black soldier fly facility unrest ===
In October 2026, Menzel Bouzelfa became the focal point of community protests following the establishment of a black soldier fly breeding facility. Local residents and agricultural workers strongly opposed the facility, raising concerns regarding its location near residential areas, citrus groves, and the local hospital, as well as questioning the legal and regulatory permissions granted for its operation without prior community consultation.

On the evening of 21 October 2026, tensions culminated during an inauguration event organized by the facility operators. Protesters gathered outside the premises to oppose the opening. A verbal dispute occurred between local citizens and a utility truck driver associated with event logistics. Following the dispute, a local resident in his sixties pursued the truck on a two-wheeled motor vehicle. During the encounter, the resident's vehicle was side-impacted and forced into oncoming traffic, resulting in a fatal collision with another oncoming automobile.

News of the demonstrator's death triggered widespread outrage throughout the town. Protesters subsequently breached the facility, ransacked and looted the property, and set fire to the building, burning it down. The public prosecutor visited the scene and ordered the victim's body to be transferred for a forensic autopsy, while opening a formal judicial investigation into the circumstances surrounding the fatal collision, the arson, and the destruction of property.

== Etymology ==
The name Menzel Bouzelfa consists of two linguistic components:

- Menzel (منزل): Derived from the Arabic root n-z-l, designating a homestead, stopover, or residence.
- Bouzelfa (بوزلفى): Refers to the patronymic Bou Zelfa (or Zalfa).

Local topographical traditions attribute the origin of Zelfa either to a notable tribal founder or landlord who established an early settlement in the area, or to regional Semitic place-naming roots.

== History ==
=== Early Foundation and Islamic Era ===
Inhabited since Antiquity, the modern town was built over the remains of Megalopolis, an agricultural settlement dating back to the Carthaginian and Roman eras. The town's modern foundation dates back to the 8th century AD during the early Aghlabid dynasty. Like nearby Menzel Temime, Menzel Bouzelfa served as a crucial inland relay stop along the route connecting Tunis to Kélibia—the strategic port from which Aghlabid naval forces set sail during the conquest of Sicily.

=== Andalusian Settlement ===
Clinging to the foothills of the Tunisian Ridge, the rural economy originally relied on olive cultivation, arboriculture (apple and orange trees), and livestock farming. During the 17th century, Morisco refugees fleeing Spain settled across Cap Bon. The arrival of Andalusian farmers transformed the area by introducing market gardening, viticulture, and advanced irrigation techniques. At the turn of the 20th century, citrus farming expanded significantly, giving the town its current status as the capital of the Maltese orange (Maltaise tunisienne).

=== Modern Era and Anti-Colonial Resistance ===
The municipality of Menzel Bouzelfa was officially instituted by decree on February 5, 1921, under the French Protectorate. During the Tunisian national liberation movement in the 1950s, the dense citrus gardens and surrounding mountains served as key strongholds and weapon supply routes for national fighters (Fellagas). In 1952, the French weekly magazine L'Express identified Menzel Bouzelfa as a major center of armed rebellion against colonial rule.

=== Social and Religious History ===
Historical research documents the arrival of prominent religious scholars in the late 18th century, including Sidi Mohamed El Menzli in 1776, who served as the imam of the local mosque and established the Qadiriyya Sufi tradition in the town through the Zaouia of Sidi Abdelkader El Djilani. Prior to the expansion of large-scale citrus production at the turn of the 20th century, the town remained a modest farming settlement.

== Demographics ==
According to municipal estimates, the population of Menzel Bouzelfa grew to 41,455 inhabitants by 2023. Earlier official census data from the Institut National de la Statistique (INS) recorded 18,551 residents in the main urban core, while the broader delegation comprised 39,839 residents across its rural sectors (Imadas).

== Economy and Agriculture ==
Situated in the fertile agricultural plains of Cap Bon, Menzel Bouzelfa serves as an economic hub for Tunisian horticulture. The town specializes in the production, processing, and export of citrus fruits—most notably the Maltese orange—alongside clementines, lemons, and olive oil.

In addition to agricultural production, the municipality hosts light industrial manufacturing, including food processing plants, agricultural packaging units, and textile processing facilities that support local employment.

== Culture and Sports ==
- Festivals: The town hosts the annual Citrus Festival (Fête des Agrumes), celebrating the regional harvest with agricultural exhibitions, local artisan displays, and cultural events.
- Sports: The local athletic scene is represented by Club sportif de Menzel Bouzelfa (CSMB; النادي الرياضي بمنزل بوزلفة), a football club founded in 1944. The club plays its home matches in orange and green kits at the Municipal Stadium (Stade Arbi Farfra). CSMB won the Tunisian Ligue II championship (North Group) in 1979.

== See also ==
- List of cities in Tunisia
