= Moknine =

Moknine المكنين El Moknine
- Commune and town
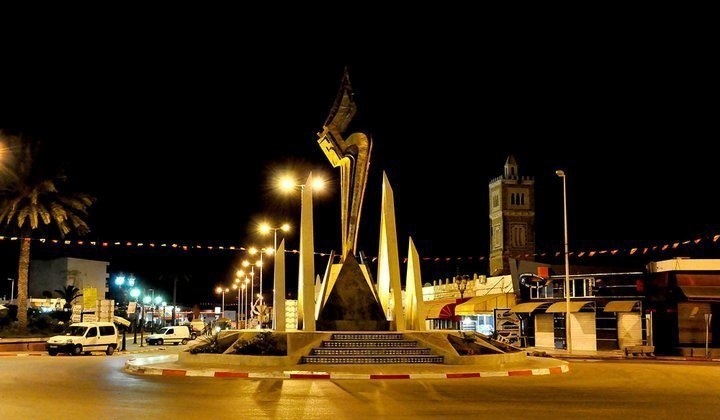

- Location within Tunisia
- Coordinates: 35°38′N 10°54′E
- Country: Tunisia
- Governorate: Monastir Governorate

Government
  - Mayor: Mongi Cherif (Nidaa Tounes)

Population (2023)
  - Total: 62,802
- Time zone: UTC+1 (CET)

Moknine (Arabic: المكنين) is a town and commune in the Monastir Governorate, Tunisia.

== Sports ==
Moknine stands out for its multi-sport club, the Sporting Club of Moknine, which includes both football and handball sections. The handball team, in particular, has been a steady contributor to the national team for decades.

== See also ==
- List of cities in Tunisia
