= Amiret El Hojjaj =

Coordinates: 35°30′12″N 10°49′11″E

Amiret El Hojjaj عميرة الحجاج
- Commune and town
- Interactive map of Amiret El Hojjaj
- Country: Tunisia
- Governorate: Monastir Governorate

Population (2014)
  - Total: 8,121
- Time zone: UTC+1 (CET)

Amiret El Hojjaj is a town and commune in the Monastir Governorate, Tunisia.

== See also ==
- List of cities in Tunisia
