= Ouerdanin =

Coordinates: 35°43′12″N 10°40′12″E

Ouerdanin الوردانين Wardanin
- Commune and town
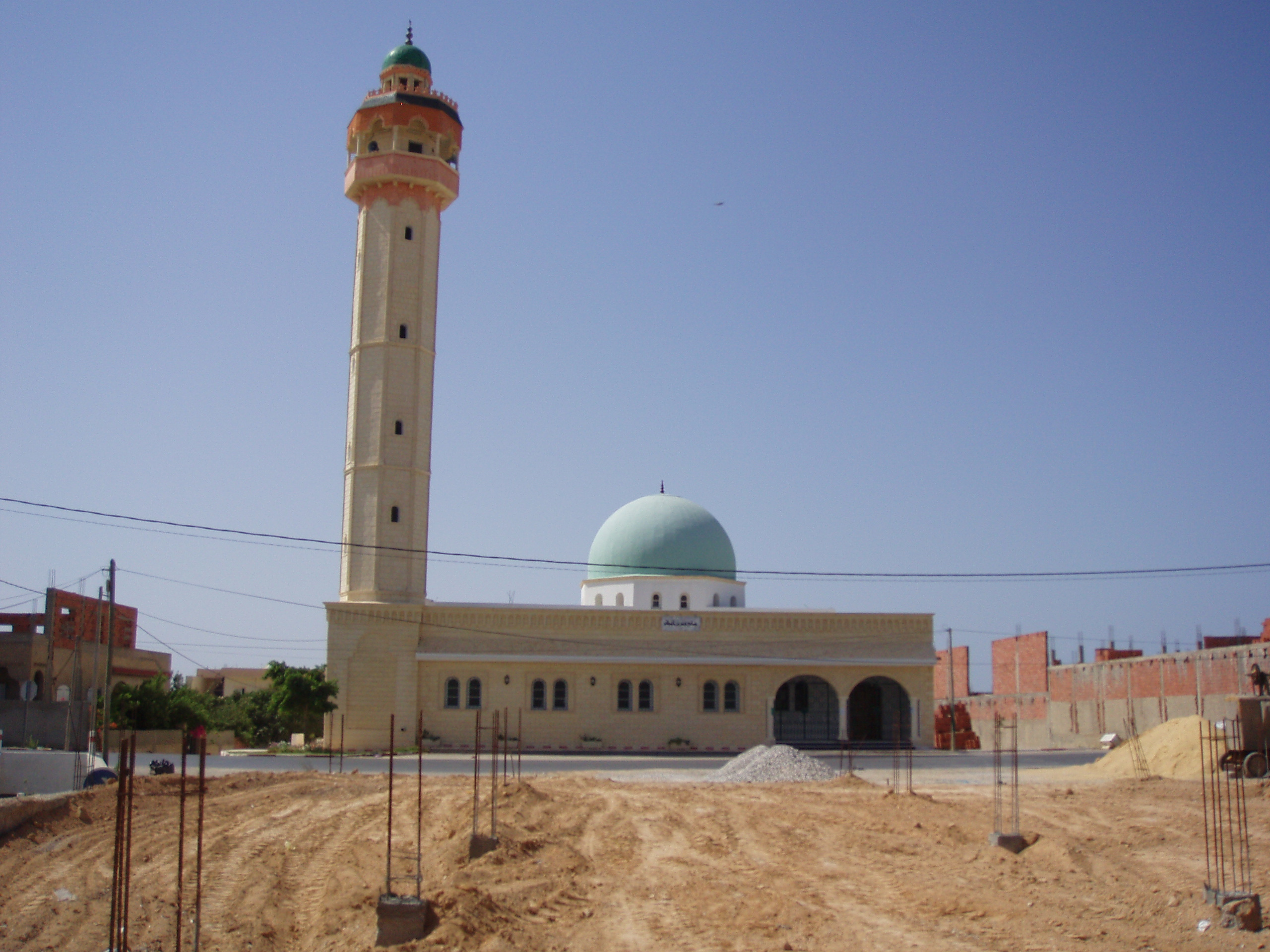
- Mosque in Querdanin
- Interactive map of Ouerdanin
- Country: Tunisia
- Governorate: Monastir Governorate

Population (2022)
  - Total: 23,707
- Time zone: UTC+1 (CET)

Ouerdanin is a town and commune in the Monastir Governorate, Tunisia. It is a recently settled village that relies heavily on its export of olive oil and fruits.

== Population ==
2014 Census (Municipal)
Homes	Families	Males	Females	Total
6312	5163	11006	10808	21814

== See also ==
- List of cities in Tunisia
