= Touza =

- Commune and town
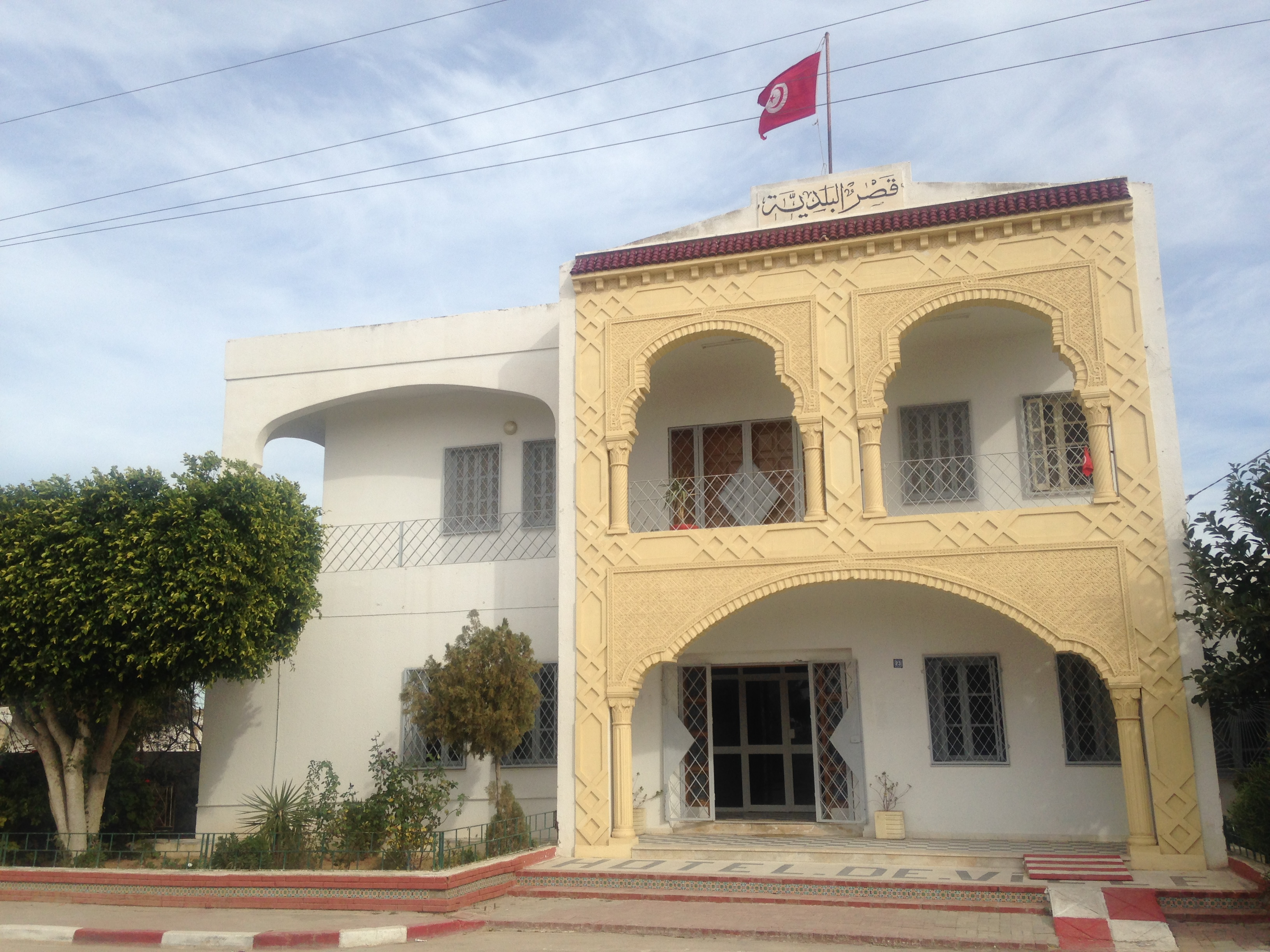

- Location within Tunisia
- Coordinates: 35°37′48″N 10°49′48″E
- Country: Tunisia
- Governorate: Monastir Governorate

Population (2014)
  - Total: 7,236
- Time zone: UTC+1 (CET)

Touza is a town and commune in the Monastir Governorate, Tunisia.

== See also ==
- List of cities in Tunisia
