= El Masdour =

Coordinates: 35°40′48″N 10°46′48″E

El Masdour المسدور
- Commune and town
- Interactive map of El Masdour
- Country: Tunisia
- Governorate: Monastir Governorate

Population (2014)
  - Total: 4,705
- Time zone: UTC+1 (CET)

El Masdour is a town and commune in the Monastir Governorate, Tunisia.

== See also ==
- List of cities in Tunisia
