= Ghenada =

Coordinates: 35.5700°N 10.8200°E

Ghenada الغنادة
- Commune and town
- Interactive map of Ghenada
- Country: Tunisia
- Governorate: Monastir Governorate

Population (2014)
  - Total: 5,100
- Time zone: UTC+1 (CET)

Ghenada is a town and commune in the Monastir Governorate, Tunisia.

== See also ==
- List of cities in Tunisia
