= Hammam Ghezèze =

Coordinates: 36°53′24″N 11°07′12″E

Hammam Ghezèze حمام الأغزاز
- Commune and town
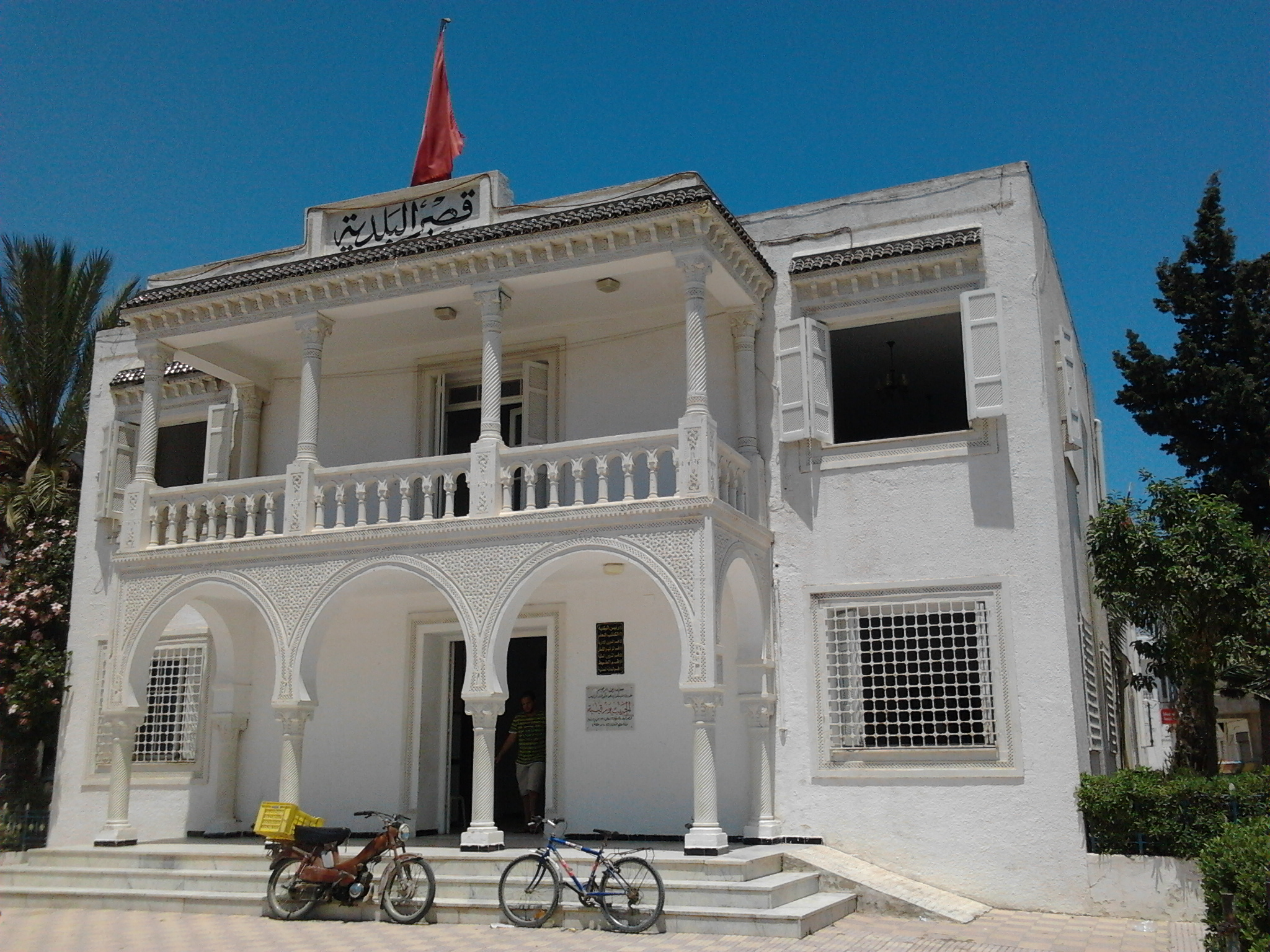
- Interactive map of Hammam Ghezèze
- Country: Tunisia
- Governorate: Nabeul Governorate

Population (2014)
  - Total: 13,634
- Time zone: UTC+1 (CET)

Hammam Ghezèze is a town and commune in the Nabeul Governorate, which is situated in north-eastern part of Tunisia. As of 2004 it had a population of 7,806.

== History ==
The locality has been inhabited since antiquity, as evidenced by Roman ruins. These ruins are reflected in the first part of the city's name: the word hammam indicates the presence of baths, although the Roman remains are now submerged by the sea. The second part of the name refers to the modern town, which was founded in the 18th century by Turkish immigrants from the al Aghzaz tribe who came from Anatolia.

== Gallery ==
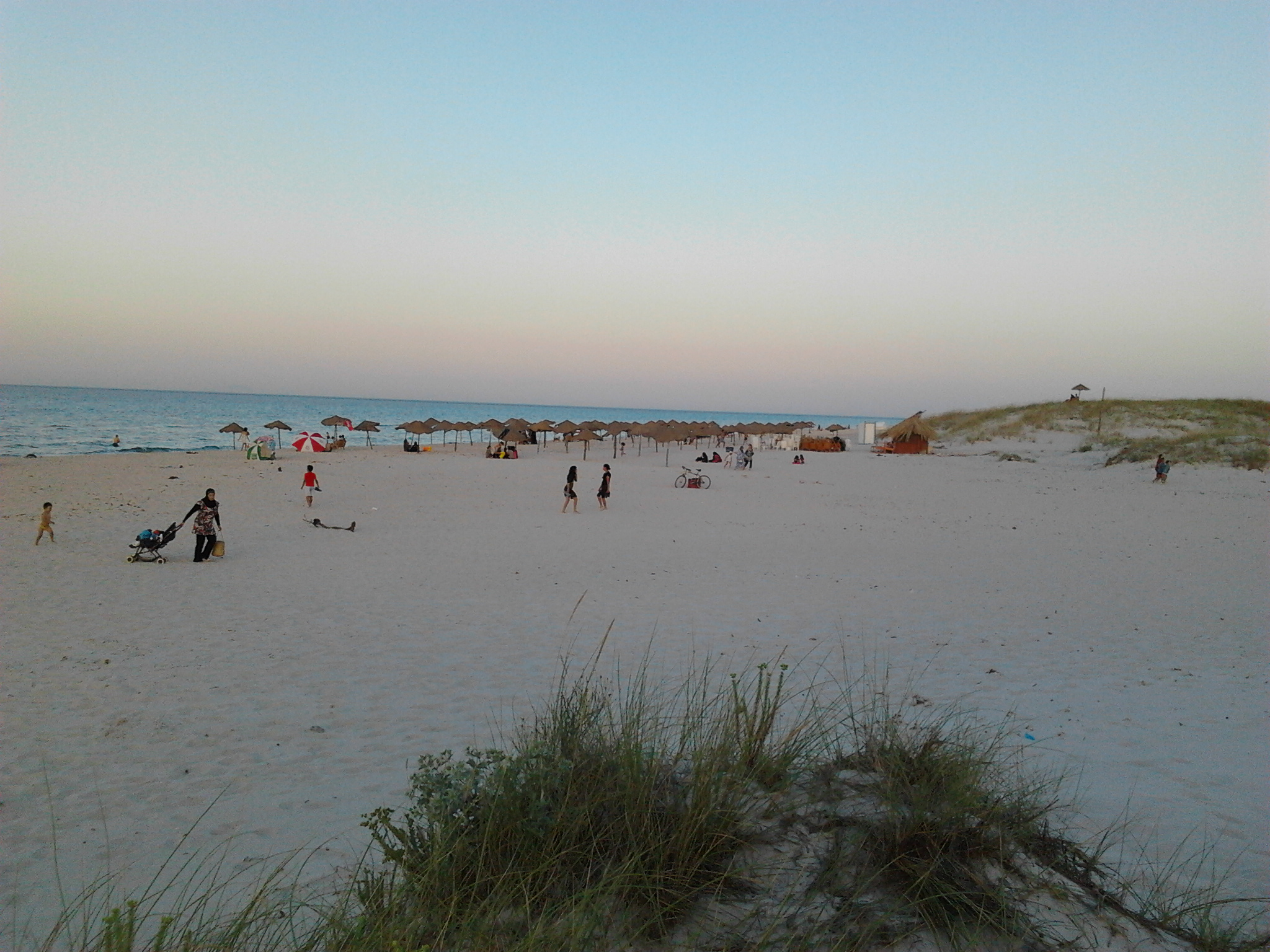

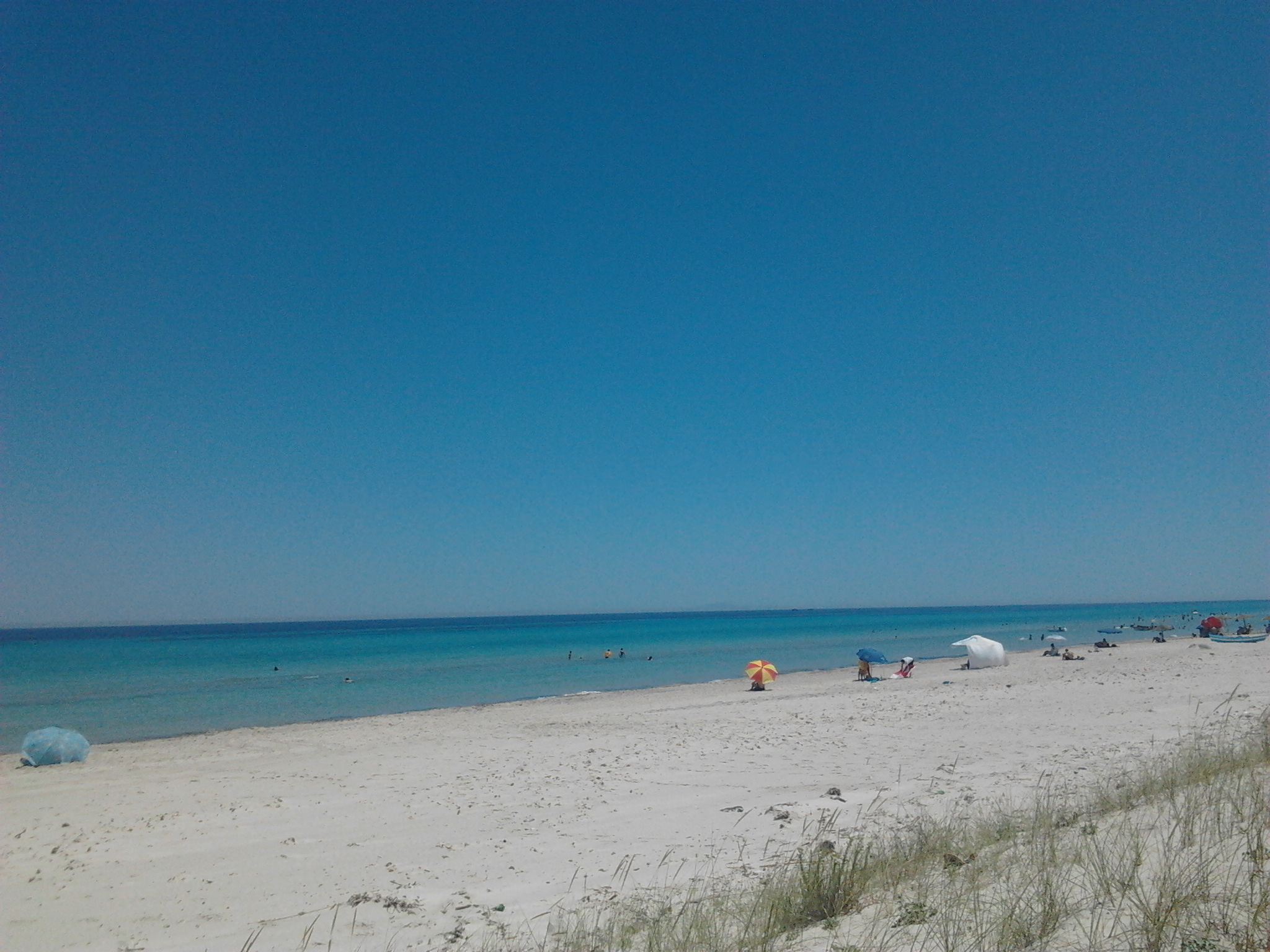

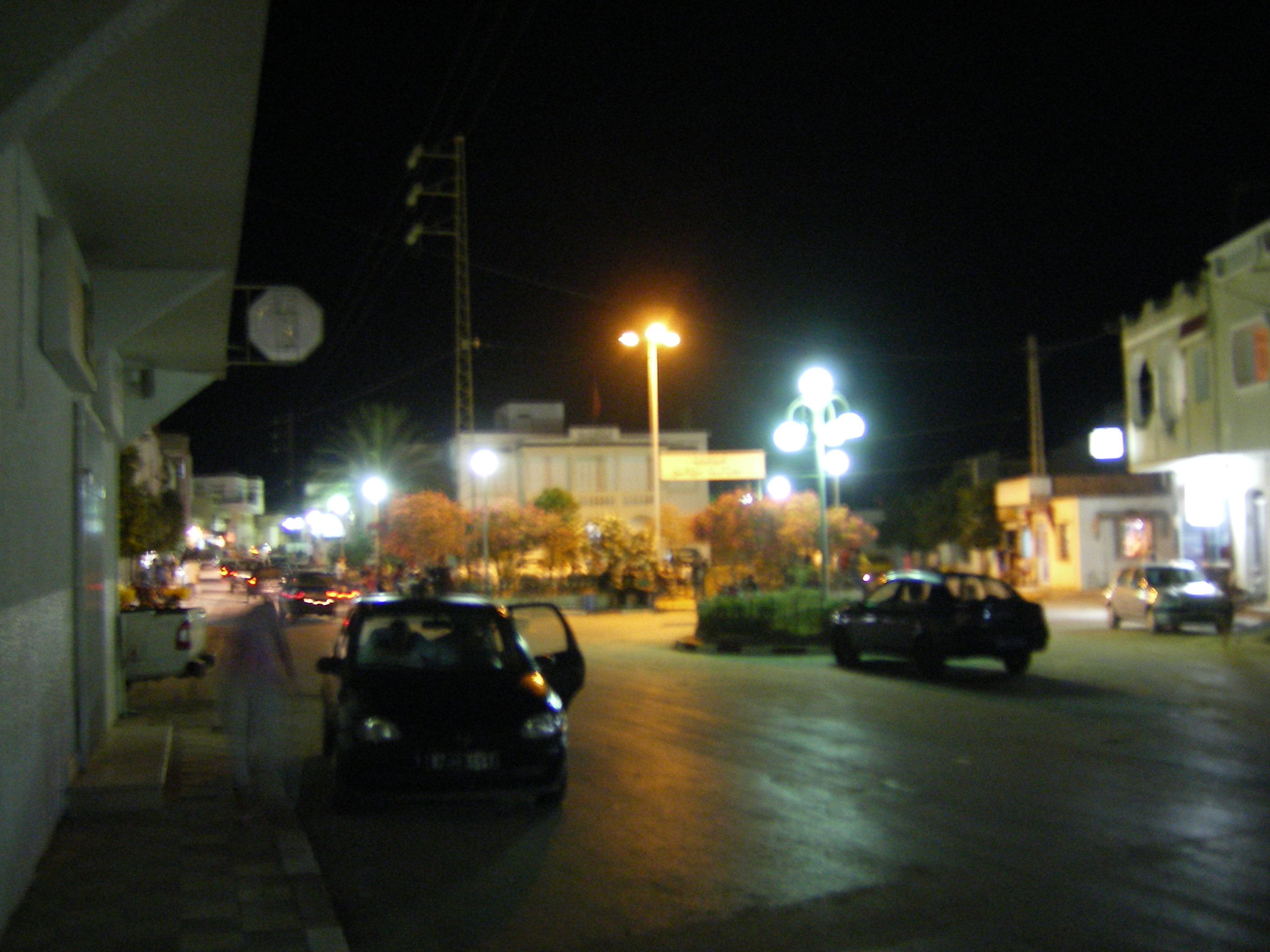

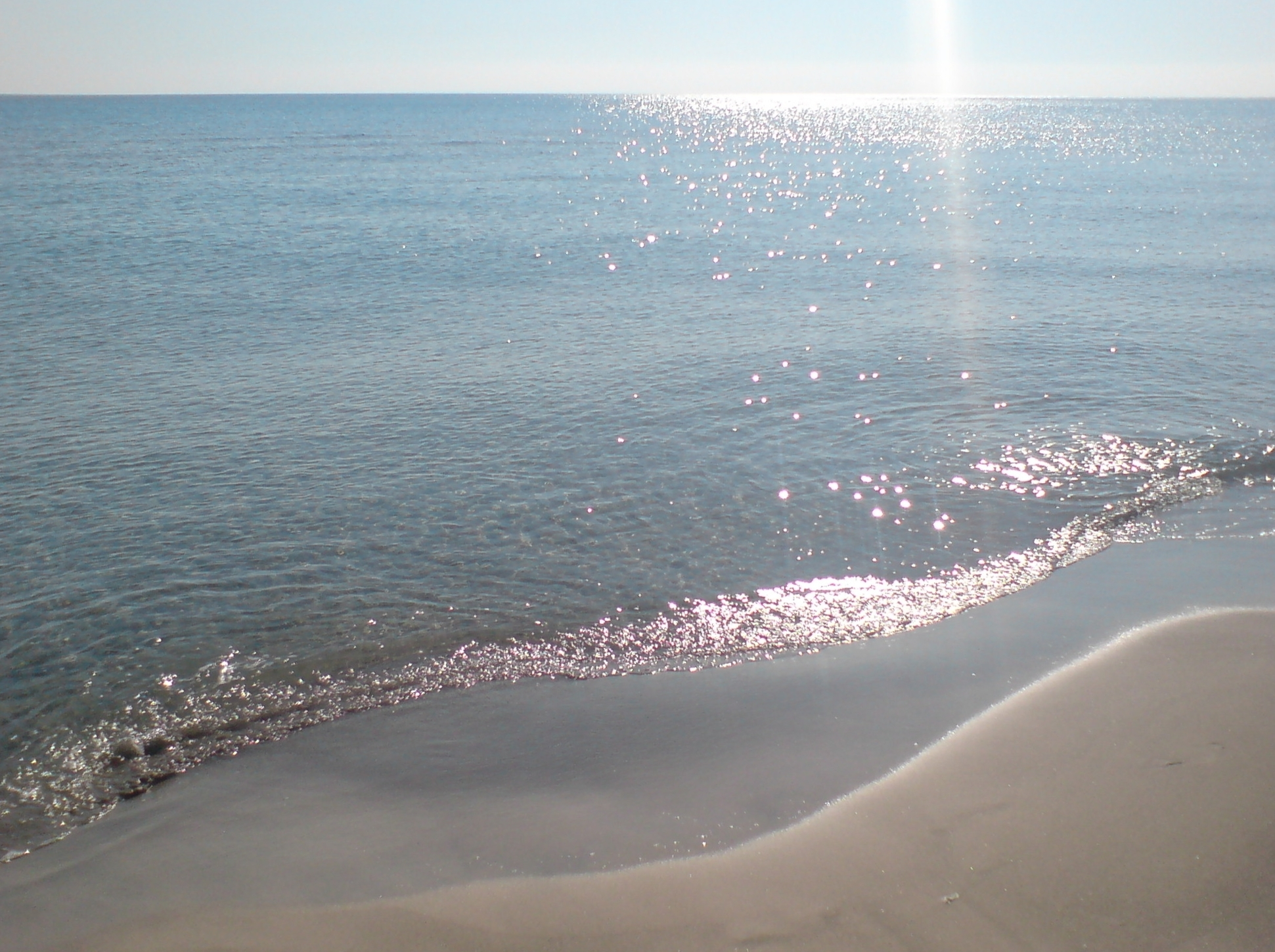

== Population ==
2014 Census (Municipal)
Homes	Families	Males	Females	Total
4753	3611	6885	6749	13634

== See also ==
- List of cities in Tunisia
