= Khniss =

Khniss خنيس
- Commune and town
- Location within Tunisia
- Coordinates: 35°42′44″N 10°49′00″E
- Country: Tunisia
- Governorate: Monastir Governorate

Area
  - Total: 18.17 km^{2} (7.02 sq mi)

Population (2024)
  - Total: 12,627
  - Density: 695.1/km^{2} (1,800/sq mi)
- Time zone: UTC+1 (CET)

Khniss is a small coastal city in the Tunisian Sahel region, located approximately 5 km south of Monastir. It is a commune of the Monastir Governorate, with a total municipal area of 18.17 km² and a population of 12,627 as of the 2024 census, up from 11,229 in 2014, reflecting an annual growth rate of 1.1% over the intercensal decade.

Khniss is the hometown of the Tunisian grammarian and lexicographer Abu Ishaq Al-Khounaïsi, who taught Arabic linguistics and grammar at the Mosque of Uqba and its affiliated academy in Kairouan, the earliest university institution established in Islamic North Africa, according to the Tunisian historian Hassan Hosni Abdelwaheb.

The exact origin of the name Khniss remains debated among historians and linguists. Some propose an ecclesiastical origin, a deformation of the Arabic word kanis (كنيس) or kanisa (كنيسة), meaning "church," referencing a Byzantine Christian sanctuary once located along the coastal ridge. Others link it to the Arabic term khounais (خنيس), meaning a land depression or low-lying basin, corresponding to the city's lagoonal topography. A third hypothesis proposes an indigenous Tamazight (Berber) origin, supported by the existence of identical place names elsewhere in North Africa, such as a Berber village named Khniss in Morocco. Comparative linguists also note a parallel with the ancient Assyrian settlement of Khinnis (or khenis) in modern-day northern Iraq.

== History ==
During Classical Antiquity, Khniss formed part of the agricultural and resource hinterland of Phoenician and Roman Ruspina. The area was prized for its high-grade sandstone, which was extracted in open quarries to build monuments across the Sahel, leaving visible marks on the local terrain.

Following the seventh-century Arab-Muslim conquests, Khniss became a center of scholarly instruction under the Aghlabids. It was the birthplace of the eighth-century grammarian Abu Ishaq Al-Khounaïsi.

The city provided refuge to Arab and Muslim families displaced from Muslim Sicily following the Norman conquest. Sources record two waves of Sicilian Arab migration to Khniss between 1061 and 1091, after the fall of the Emirate of Sicily. This migration created lasting ties between Khniss and neighboring Monastir, where the Sicilian scholar Sidi El Mezri, a native of Mazara del Vallo, was later entombed. Under the Zirid dynasty, Khniss remained part of the coastal ribat defense network, protected against Hilalian invasions and adhering to Maliki jurisprudence.

Following Tunisian independence in 1956, local civic leaders prioritized education. Teachers trained at Al-Zaytuna Mosque in Tunis, led by educators such as Abdelaziz El Sakli, established primary and secondary schooling networks in the city, producing a relatively high concentration of academics, physicians, engineers, magistrates, and administrators for its population size.

== Geography ==
Khniss lies at the northern edge of an extensive marine depression of shallow seabed that stretches south to Cap Dimass in Bekalta, the site of ancient Thapsus. The adjacent sea is divided into two distinct zones: a sheltered, shallow lagoon with little wave action known locally as the "Dead Sea" (Bahr El Mayyit), and an outer zone with moderate currents and waves known as the "Live Sea" (Bahr El Hayy). The natural wetland of Sabkhet Khniss, contiguous with the Monastir salt pans, covers about 12 km².

In parts of the shallow seabed, remains of Roman mosaics can be seen near the sewage treatment plant of Lamta-Sayyada. Local oral tradition refers to the area as "Al Maklouba" ("the overturned land"), an old myth attributing the altered coastal landscape to a major earthquake.

The lagoon once supported a rich marine ecosystem that sustained the livelihoods of local fishing families, who used an eco-friendly netting method known as Demmassa. In recent decades, the lagoon's ecological balance has been disrupted by a combination of poor planning and pollution. Infrastructure built to divert rainwater and protect the Monastir-Skanes International Airport and the nearby presidential summer residence, along with an artificial sand barrier known as Drina built across the natural drainage course, has restricted tidal exchange. Untreated and semi-treated wastewater from the Office National de l'Assainissement (ONAS) treatment plant serving Lamta and Sayyada has further degraded water quality, contributing to eutrophication, the regression of Posidonia oceanica seagrass meadows, and a decline in fish stocks.

Despite this pressure, Sabkhet Khniss remains ecologically significant. During the 2025 breeding season, ornithological surveys confirmed two nesting pairs of the Red-crested pochard (Netta rufina), the first verified breeding record of the species in a Tunisian wetland.

== Demographics ==
According to the Institut National de la Statistique (INS), the municipal population of Khniss grew from 11,229 in the 2014 census to 12,627 in the 2024 census, an annual growth rate of 1.1% over the intercensal decade.

Population and density, 2014–2024
Indicator	2014 Census	2024 Census
Total population	11,229	12,627
Male population	Data unrecorded	6,366 (50.4%)
Female population	Data unrecorded	6,261 (49.6%)
Land area (km²)	18.17	18.17
Population density (per km²)	618.0	695.1
Annual growth rate	Base year	+1.1% (2014–2024)

Age structure, 2024 census
Age group	Population	% of total
0–14 years	3,095	24.5%
15–64 years	8,371	66.3%
65+ years	1,161	9.2%
80+ years	236	1.9%

== Economy ==
Traditionally, the economic activity of Khniss was based on olive farming, lagoon fishing, stone quarrying, and handcraft wool textile production. Weavers used manual pit-looms (Nawl Arabi) to produce woolen goods such as floor coverings (klim), bedspreads (ferrachia and abena), and hooded cloaks (barnous and kedroun).

In 1952, a group of weavers from Khniss trained in Ksar Hellal on mechanical Jacquard looms (Nawl Jacquard), which enabled complex silk and synthetic fabric weaving. Led by figures such as Mahmoud El Akhal, Abdelatif El Arabi, Salem El Sakli, and Mohamed Amer Haj Hassan El Sakli, they introduced Jacquard weaving to Khniss, making it a regional center for Jacquard silk production.

In the late twentieth century, national industrial policy shifted the local economy toward large-scale, export-oriented apparel manufacturing. Khniss became part of the Monastir Governorate's textile cluster, comprising 397 small and medium-sized enterprises, 86.5% of which produce finished garments exclusively for export. Industrial zones around Khniss and neighboring Bouhjar host integrated textile plants such as ITS Textiles (Impression Teinture Sahel), operating since 1994 with automated dyeing, knitting, and printing capacity of up to 150 tonnes of fabric monthly.

Evolution of the local textile industry
Era	Primary equipment	Core products	Main market	Dominant labor force
Traditional era	Pit-loom (Nawl Arabi)	Ferrachia, abena, barnous, kedroun, klim	Domestic Sahelian markets	Male master weavers and artisan families
Mid-20th century	Mechanical Jacquard loom (Nawl Jacquard)	Woven silk and patterned decorative textiles	National urban centers (Tunis, Sousse)	Skilled male loom operators
Modern industrial era	Automated cutting and sewing lines	Ready-made fast-fashion apparel	European Union export markets	Predominantly female factory workers

This shift has come with structural challenges: the decline of manual wool weaving risks the permanent loss of traditional know-how, and the modern export garment sector relies heavily on female factory labor facing production quotas tied to international fast-fashion cycles, with base wages near the statutory minimum of about 700 TND (€200) and weak union representation.

== Sports and civic life ==
The city's main athletic club, Club Sportif de Khniss (CS Khniss), was founded in 1985. Its football team plays in regional leagues and the Tunisian Cup, with home matches held at the Stade de Football de Khniss. The municipality also supports community events such as the annual "Khaled Run For..." road race.
