= Menzel Ennour =

Coordinates: 35°40′08″N 10°46′45″E

Menzel Ennour منزل النور
- Commune and town
- Interactive map of Menzel Ennour
- Country: Tunisia
- Governorate: Monastir Governorate

Population (2014)
  - Total: 11,772
- Time zone: UTC+1 (CET)

Menzel Ennour is a town and commune in the Monastir Governorate, Tunisia.

== See also ==
- List of cities in Tunisia
