= Amiret El Fhoul =

Coordinates: 35°26′39″N 10°49′36″E

- Commune and village
- Interactive map of Amiret El Fhoul
- Country: Tunisia
- Governorate: Monastir Governorate

Population (2014)
  - Total: 5,255
- Time zone: UTC1 (CET)

Amiret El Fhoul (Arabic: عميرة الفحول) is a village and commune located in the Monastir Governorate, Tunisia, located 205 kilometres from Tunis. Its population is 4,525 (2004).

== See also ==
- List of cities in Tunisia
