= Téboulba =

- Commune and town
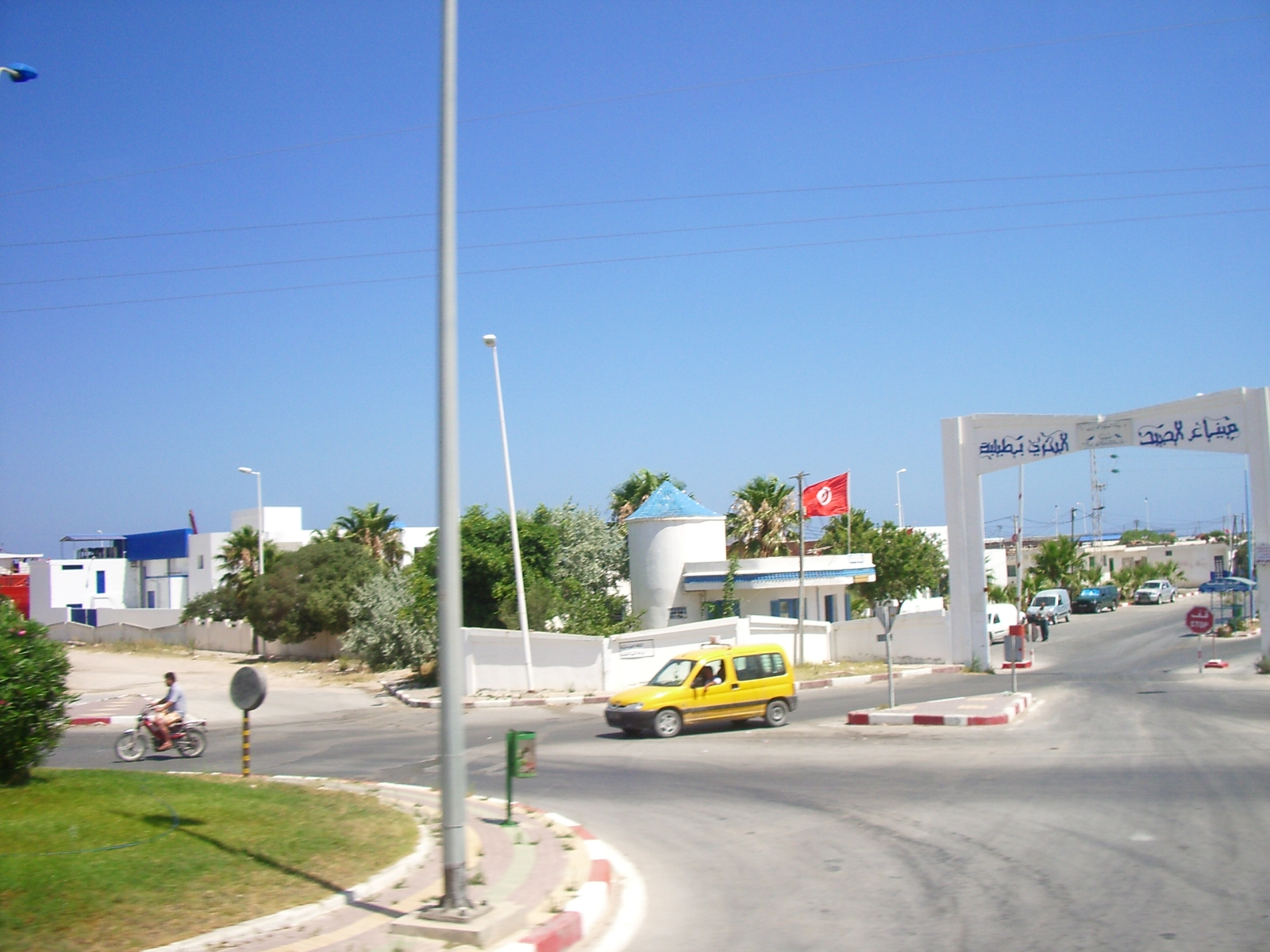
- The entrance of the fishing port of Téboulba

- Location within Tunisia
- Country: Tunisia
- Governorate: Monastir Governorate

Population (2022)
  - Total: 41,731
- Time zone: UTC+1 (CET)

Téboulba (Arabic: طبلبة) is a town in the Sahel region of Tunisia. It is located about 25 kilometers south-east of Monastir. It is part of the administrative governorate of Monastir, and is the county seat of the Delegation with the same name, which has a population of 37,485 people.

== Population ==
2014 Census (Municipal)
Homes	Families	Males	Females	Total
10507	9105	18877	18608	37485

== Notable people ==
- Ichraf Saied, First Lady of Tunisia
- Dhafer Youssef, composer and singer
