= Menzel Mehiri =

Coordinates: 35°25′28″N 9°51′08″E

Menzel Mehiri منزل المهيري
- Commune and town
- Interactive map of Menzel Mehiri
- Country: Tunisia
- Governorate: Kairouan Governorate
- Time zone: UTC+1 (CET)
- Postal code: 3114

Menzel Mehiri is a town and commune in the Kairouan Governorate, Tunisia. As of 2022 it had a population of 16,000.

== See also ==
- List of cities in Tunisia
