= Zaouiet Kontoch =

Zaouiet Kontoch زاوية قنطش
- Commune and town
- Location within Tunisia
- Coordinates: 35°35′00″N 10°43′00″E
- Country: Tunisia
- Governorate: Monastir Governorate

Population (2014)
  - Total: 6 713
- Time zone: UTC+1 (CET)

Zaouiet Kontoch is a city in the Tunisian Sahel located in the immediate vicinity of Jemmal at 35 ° 38 'North, 10 ° 46 'e.

Attached to the Monastir Governorate, it is a municipality with 6 713 inhabitants according to the 2014 census, whereas there were 6 713 inhabitants in 2014. It would be so named because of the historical presence of a small zaouia of a Muslim holy man. On the sporting level, the city is home to the Zaouiet Kontoch Sports Association, which specializes in table tennis. The Mayor is Chaker Kacem.
