= Jedelienne =

Coordinates: 35°35′37″N 9°03′23″E

Jedelienne جدليان
- Commune and town
- Interactive map of Jedelienne
- Country: Tunisia
- Governorate: Kasserine Governorate

Population (2014)
  - Total: 4,352
- Time zone: UTC+1 (CET)

Jedelienne is a town and commune in the Kasserine Governorate, Tunisia. As of 2004 it had a population of 3,990.

== See also ==
- List of cities in Tunisia
