= Menzel Kamel =

Coordinates: 35°38′N 10°40′E

Menzel Kamel منزل كامل
- Commune and town
- Interactive map of Menzel Kamel
- Country: Tunisia
- Governorate: Monastir Governorate

Population (2018)
  - Total: 9,532
- Time zone: UTC+1 (CET)

Menzel Kamel is a town and commune in the Monastir Governorate, Tunisia.

== See also ==
- List of cities in Tunisia
