= Menzel (surname) =

Menzel is a German-language surname. It is derived from Menz, which is a shortened form of names like Hermann, Mangold and Clemens. In the Czech Republic (Czech feminine: Menzelová), it also appears in the forms Menzl (Menzlová) and Mencl (Menclová). Notable people with the surname include:

- Adolph Menzel (1815–1905), German artist
- Bithja Menzel (born 1993), German politician
- Christian Menzel (born 1971), German racecar driver
- Daniel Menzel (born 1991), Australian footballer
- Donald Howard Menzel (1901–1976), American astronomer
- Emil Wolfgang Menzel, Jr. (1929–2012), American primatologist
- Gerhard Menzel (1894–1966), German screenwriter
- Herman Menzel (1904–1988), American artist
- Herybert Menzel (1906–1945), German poet and writer
- Idina Menzel (née Mentzel; born 1971), American actress, singer and songwriter
- Jiří Menzel (1938–2020), Czech film director
- Joachim Menzel (1914–2005), German military officer
- Josef Joachim Menzel (1933–2020), German historian
- Käthe Menzel-Jordan (1916–2026), German architect and preservationist
- Max Menzel (born 1941), Australian politician
- Michael Menzel, German game artist
- Nico Menzel (born 1997), German racing driver
- Paul Julius Menzel (1864–1927), German physician and paleobotanist
- Paul Menzel, American actor, writer and producer
- Peter Menzel (born 1948), American photojournalist
- Robert Menzel (born 1991), Polish footballer
- Roderich Menzel (1907–1987), Czech-German tennis player
- Rudolphina Menzel (1891–1973), Austrian cynologist and animal behaviorist
- Tim Menzel (born 1992), German rugby player
- Troy Menzel (born 1994), Australian footballer
- Wolfgang Menzel (1798–1873), German poet
