= Menzel Salem =

Coordinates: 35°52′N 8°28′E

Menzel Salem منزل سالم
- Commune and town
- Interactive map of Menzel Salem
- Country: Tunisia
- Governorate: Kef Governorate
- Time zone: UTC+1 (CET)

Menzel Salem is a town and commune in the Kef Governorate, Tunisia. As of 2004 it had a population of 2,211.

== See also ==
- List of cities in Tunisia
