= Zéramdine =

Coordinates: 35.576°N 10.734°E

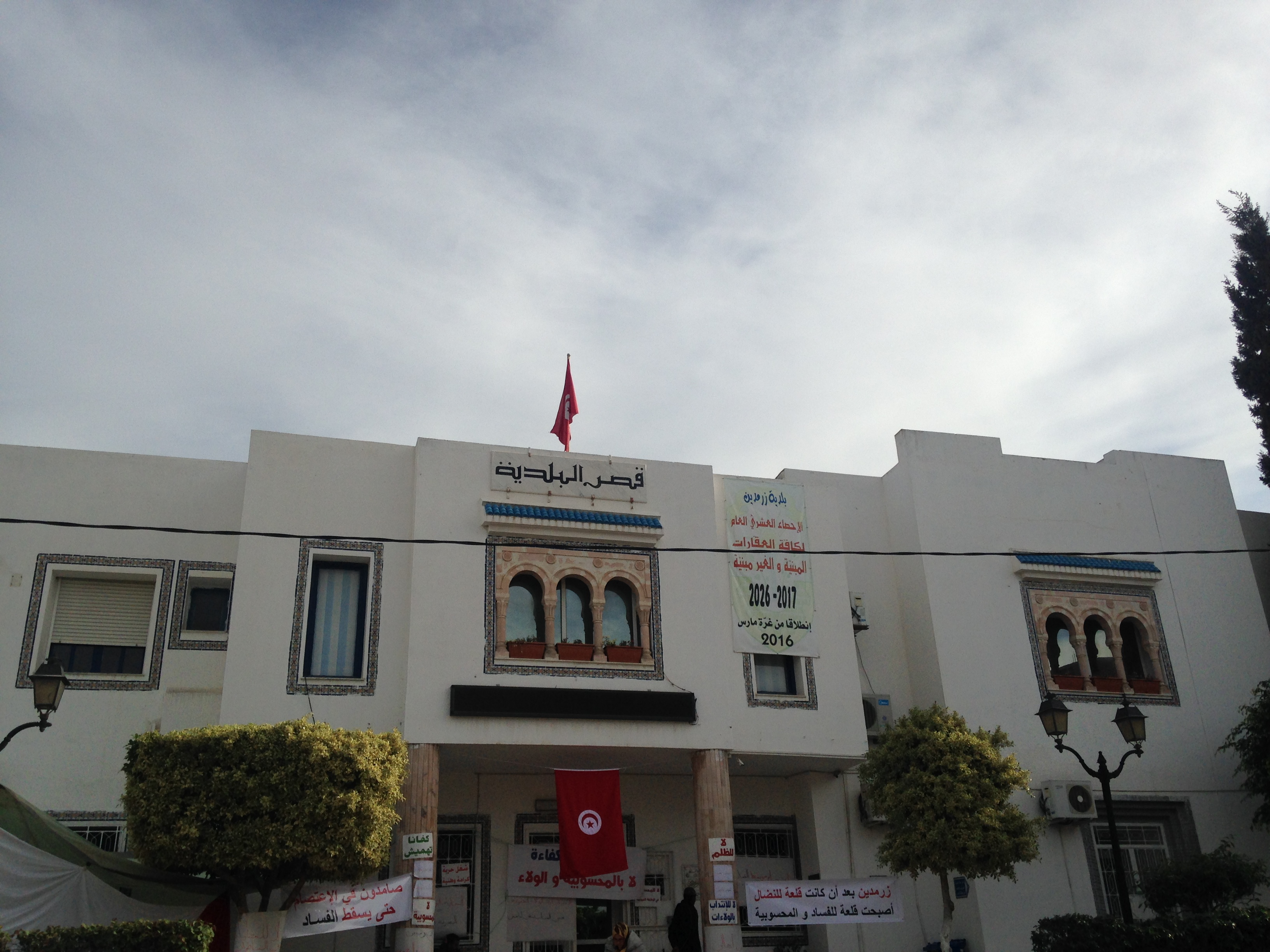
Zeramdine's city hall.

Zéramdine is a Tunisian city located in the Sahel, Tunisia region about twenty kilometers southwest of Monastir.

Attached to the governorate of Monastir, it is a municipality with 16,806 inhabitants in 2014, located at 35° 35 'n, 10° 44'e. It is also the capital of a region of 29,733 people including in addition to the town itself, the localities of Mzaougha, Menzel Hayet and Mlichette.

The Roman name of the city was Avidus Vicus. The Muslim saint and protector of the city, Sidi Ismail, was native to the region of Saguia el-Hamra (southern Morocco ) and then moved into the region in the 16th century. Its zaouia sheltered flood victims in 1969. This city is known to have sheltered numerous militant nationalists (fellagas), fighting against the French during their occupation of Tunisia.

In the center of the vast olive groves in the Sahel, it is also strongly influenced by industry, mainly brick and textiles, more than half of the workforce is employed in manufacturing. There are more than ten textile factories, the largest of which is Zetex founded in 1986, and several large brick factories: Lahmar and Co. Industrial complex Ali Mhenni, Industry brick Zeramdine, CAREC, etc.

In sporting terms, the city hosts a team of rugby, the Rugby Club Zeramdine, and a soccer team, sports in Zeramdine has evolved since 1959. The city also organizes a polycultural festival during the summer.
