= Bekalta =

Bekalta البقالطة
- Location in Tunisia
- Coordinates: 35°37′N 11°00′E
- Country: Tunisia
- Governorate: Monastir Governorate

Population (2022)
  - Total: 20,506
- Time zone: UTC1 (CET)
- Postal code: 5090

Bekalta (Arabic: البقالطة, romanized: al-Biqāliṭa), is a Tunisian coastal town, around 30 km. south of Monastir and around 14 km. northeast of Mahdia. The main activities of the local population are agriculture and fishing. It gives its name to the Baklouti pepper. As of 2014 it had a total population of 17,850 people.

== See also ==
- Thapsus
- Monastir Governorate
