= Ksibet El Mediouni =

Ksibet El Mediouni قصيبة المديوني
- Commune and town
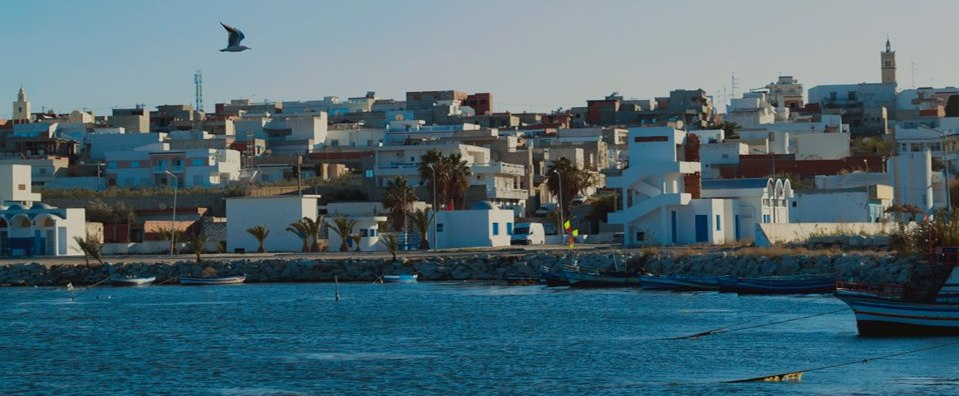
- Ksibet El Mediouni coast

- Location within Tunisia
- Coordinates: 35°41′24″N 10°51′00″E
- Country: Tunisia
- Governorate: Monastir Governorate

Population (2014)
  - Total: 14,490
- Time zone: UTC+1 (CET)
- Postal code: 5031

Ksibet El Mediouni (Arabic: قصيبة المديوني) is a small city located in the region of the Sahel in Tunisia around 10 km south of Monastir. It is a commune in the Monastir Governorate.

== History ==
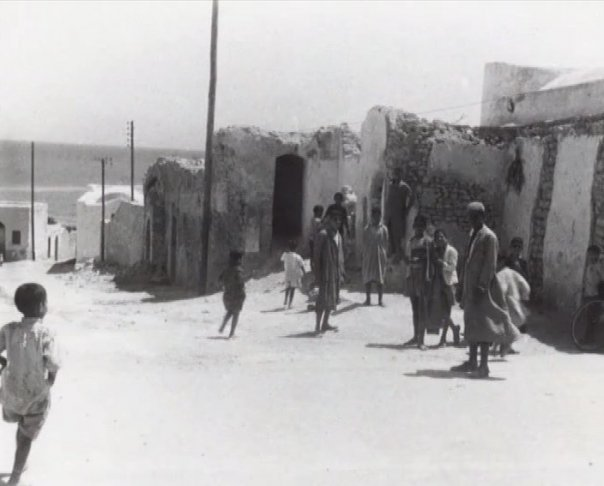
Street of Ksibet el Mediouni in 1960

The city origins are thought to be linked to the establishment of an observation post of the Almoravids to control Christian incursion on this part of the Tunisian coast.

Its name is linked to the local saint Mohamed Ben Abd'Allah El Mediouni who may be an Almoravide coming from the village of Mediouna near Casablanca in Morocco.

The city is known for its traditional crafts, especially for its handmade carpets.

== See also ==
- List of cities in Tunisia
