= Menzel Hayet =

Coordinates: 35°34′48″N 10°43′48″E

Menzel Hayet منزل الحياة
- Commune and town
- Interactive map of Menzel Hayet
- Country: Tunisia
- Governorate: Monastir Governorate

Population (2014)
  - Total: 12,927
- Time zone: UTC+1 (CET)

Menzel Hayet is a town and commune in the Monastir Governorate, Tunisia. Historically, it was known as Bougabrine.

The town's economy is primarily driven by the building materials processing industry, including the production of bricks, ceramics, and glass. The production facilities are located along National Road 1 (RN1) in the direction of Sfax.

== See also ==
- List of cities in Tunisia
