= Beni Hassen =

Coordinates: 35.57°N 10.82°E

Beni Hassene بني حسان
- Commune and town
- Interactive map of Beni Hassene
- Country: Tunisia
- Governorate: Monastir Governorate

Population (2014)
  - Total: 8,801
- Time zone: UTC+1 (CET)
- Postal code: 5014

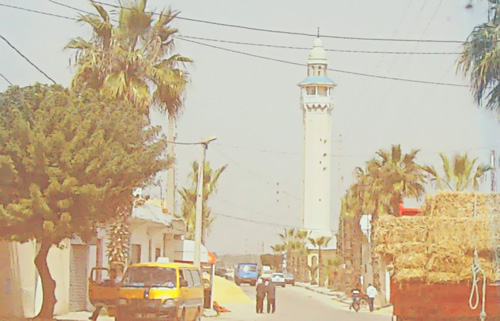
A street view in Beni Hassen, Monastir, Tunisia, featuring palm trees, a mosque minaret, and vehicles on a sunny day. A cart loaded with hay is also visible on the right.

Beni Hassen is a town and commune in the Monastir Governorate, Tunisia.

== Commerce and culture ==
An olive oil processing factory is located in Beni Hassen city.

The town hosts an annual culture festival, called the Sidi Salem Festival.

== See also ==
- List of cities in Tunisia
