= Monastir Governorate =

Governorate of Tunisia

Monastir ولاية المنستير
- Governorate
- Map of Tunisia with Monastir highlighted
- Coordinates: 35°47′N 10°50′E
- Country: Tunisia
- Created: 5 June 1974
- Capital: Monastir

Government
  - Governor: Issa Moussa (since 2024)

Area
  - Total: 1,019 km^{2} (393 sq mi)
  - Rank: Ranked 21st of 24

Population (2024)
  - Total: 599,769
  - Rank: Ranked 9th of 24
  - Density: 588.6/km^{2} (1,524/sq mi)
- Time zone: UTC+01 (CET)
- Postal prefix: 5xxx
- ISO 3166 code: TN-52

Monastir Governorate (Arabic: ولاية المنستير, romanized: Wilāyat al-Munastīr; French: Gouvernorat de Monastir) is one of the twenty-four governorates of Tunisia. It is situated in the center-east of Tunisia. It covers an area of 1,019 km^{2} (393 mi^{2}) and has a population of 599,769 (2024 census). The capital is Monastir. The economy of the Monastir governorate is based primarily on agriculture (especially olive growing). Eighty-six percent of the land is reserved for agriculture. However, it is industry that employs the most people. The governorate has approximately 1,200 industrial companies, most of which work in the textile sector, mainly exporting to European Union countries. These factories are located mainly around Ksar Hellal and Bembla; these towns account for 83% of the region's industrial jobs.

== Administrative divisions ==
The governorate is divided into thirteen delegations (mutamadiyat), listed below with their populations at the 2004 and 2014 censuses:

Delegation	Area in km^{2}	Pop'n 2004 Census	Pop'n 2014 Census
Bekalta	40.3	13,695	17,850
Bembla	48.9	27,382	32,555
Beni Hassen	86.8	12,650	13,869
Jemmal	156.1	55,272	65,420
Ksar Hellal	21.9	39,991	49,376
Ksibet el-Médiouni	36.8	28,722	34,576
Moknine	197.3	75,885	89,277
Monastir	62.1	81,294	104,535
Ouerdanine	51.4	18,852	21,814
Sahline	42.5	21,799	27,449
Sayada-Lamta-Bou Hajar	12.8	22,947	24,889
Téboulba	23.5	31,154	37,485
Zéramdine	252.0	25,947	29,733

== Cities and towns ==
The following cities and towns are located in the Monastir Governorate:

- Amiret El Fhoul
- Amiret El Hojjaj
- Amiret Touazra
- Bekalta
- Bembla
- Beni Hassen
- Bennane
- Bouhjar
- Cherahil
- El Masdour
- Ghenada
- Jemmal
- Zaouiet Kontoch
- Khniss
- Ksar Hellal
- Ksibet el-Médiouni
- Lamta
- Menzel Ennour
- Menzel Farsi
- Menzel Hayet
- Menzel Kamel
- Mlichette
- Moknine
- Mzaougha
- Monastir (capital)
- Ouerdanin
- Sayada
- Téboulba
- Touza

== Notable people ==
- Habib Bourguiba
- Ons Jabeur
