= Menzel Temime =

Menzel Temime منزل تميم
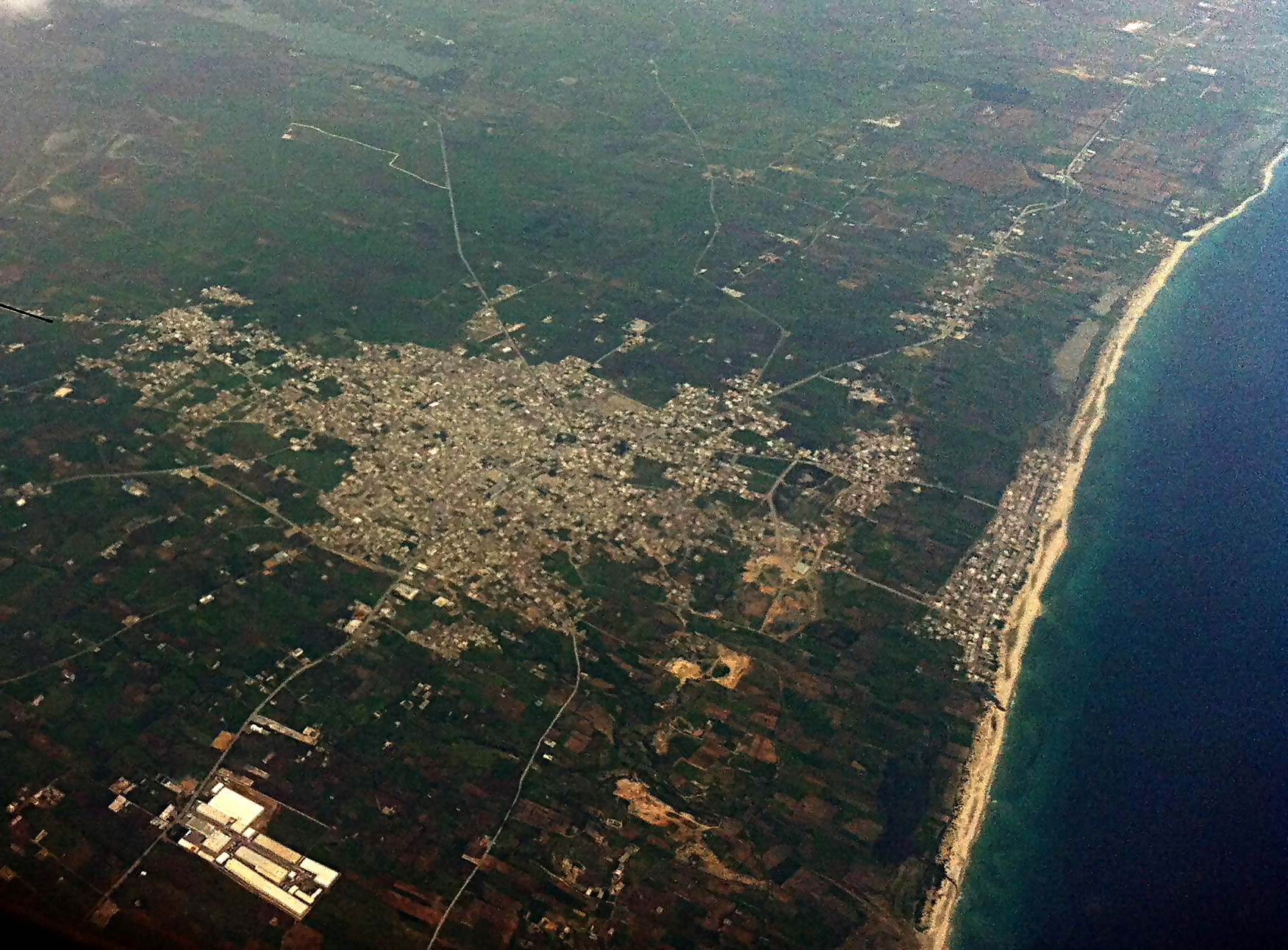

- Location in Tunisia
- Coordinates: 36°47′N 10°59′E
- Country: Tunisia
- Governorate: Nabeul Governorate

Population (2022)
  - Total: 61,489
- Time zone: UTC1 (CET)

Menzel Temime (منزل تميم) is a town in northeast Tunisia southeast of the peninsula of Cap Bon.

The municipality of Menzel Temime was established on 19 February 1921, the municipal boundaries stretching over an area of 25,000 hectares. It is located in the Nabeul Governorate and has a population of 44,424 inhabitants.

The city was founded in the eleventh century by Moez ibn Temmime, a member of the Normans.

It is known for its food industry (peanuts, tomatoes, and peppers) and textile industry (garments, shoes and hosiery). It hosts a large weekly market. The city is also known for its well preserved beach.

The city is the hometown for Union Sportive Témimiene, one of the oldest handball clubs in Tunisia. Menzel Temime is the hometown of the singer Youssef Tmimi and handballer Wissem Hmam.
