= Nabeul Governorate =

Governorate of Tunisia

Nabeul ولاية نابل
- Governorate
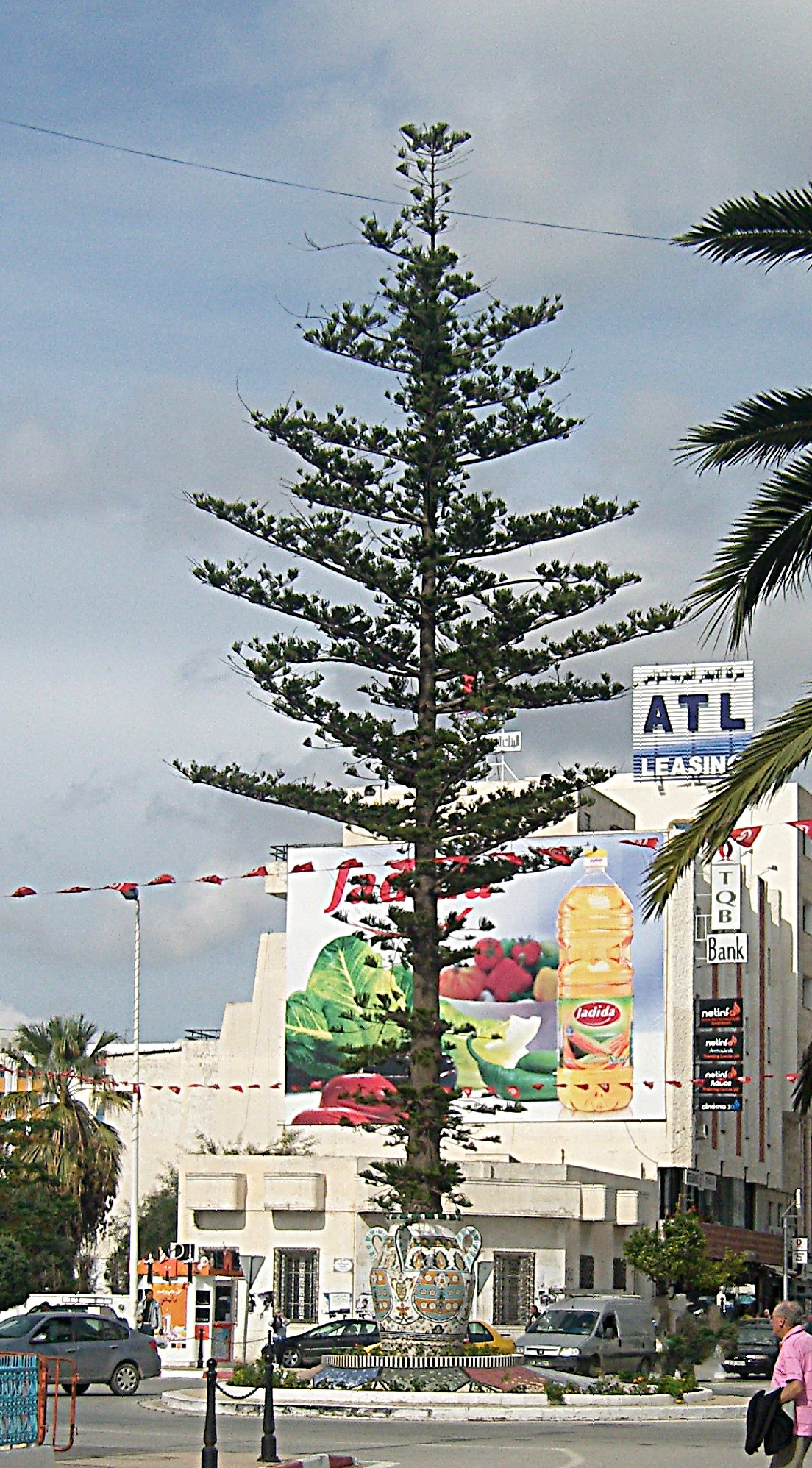
- The center of Nabeul.

- Map of Tunisia with Nabeul highlighted

- Subdivisions of Nabeul Governorate
- Coordinates: 36°45′N 10°45′E
- Country: Tunisia
- Created: 21 June 1956
- Capital: Nabeul

Government
  - Governor: Hana Chouchani (since 2024)

Area
  - Total: 2,788 km^{2} (1,076 sq mi)
  - Rank: Ranked 17th of 24

Population (2024)
  - Total: 863,172
  - Rank: Ranked 3rd of 24
  - Density: 309.6/km^{2} (801.9/sq mi)
- Time zone: UTC+01 (CET)
- Postal prefix: xx
- ISO 3166 code: TN-21

Nabeul Governorate (Tunisian Arabic: ولاية نابل Wilāyat Nābil Tunisian pronunciation: [ˈnɛːbɪl]; French: Gouvernorat de Nabeul) is one of the 24 governorates of Tunisia. It is situated in north-eastern Tunisia. It covers an area of 2,788 km^{2} and has a population of 863,172 (2024 census). The capital is Nabeul.

Nabeul Governorate forms a peninsula which is surrounded by the Mediterranean Sea on three sides. On the south-west side it is delimited by the three governorates of Zaghouan, Sousse and Ben Arous.

== History ==
Nabeul, the main city of the governorate, was founded in the 5th century BC by the Greeks of Cyrene, serving as a trade port. Its name is an Arabised form of the Greek Neapolis 'new city' (an etymology it shares with Naples, Neapoli, and Nablus).

== Administrative divisions ==
The governorate is divided into sixteen delegations (mutamadiyat), listed below with their populations at the 2004 and 2014 Censuses:

Delegation	Area in km^{2}	Pop'n 2004 Census	Pop'n 2014 Census
Béni Khalled	114.4	33,897	37,964
Béni Khiar	106.3	35,565	43,132
Bou Argoub	129.6	27,846	30,942
Dar Châabane El Fehri	68.7	39,477	46,781
El Haouaria	309.7	39,378	41,317
El Mida	152.5	23,667	26,995
Grombalia	302.7	55,489	67,475
Hammamet	325.5	95,468	97,855
Hammam El Guezaz	94.7	14,324	15,727
Kélibia	125.7	53,648	58,491
Korba	206.5	60,564	68,964
Menzel Bouzelfa	133.8	33,599	37,860
Menzel Temime	263.2	59,453	65,645
Nabeul	74.0	59,490	73,128
Soliman	142.6	41,846	53,491
Takelsa	278.5	20,169	22,151

== Municipalities ==
There are 24 municipalities (communes) within the Nabeul Governorate:

Municipality	Population 2004 Census	Population 2014 Census
Azmour	5,001	5,054
Béni Khalled	12,573	15,463
Béni Khiar	16,992	21,626
Bou Argoub	10,311	11,990
Dar Allouch	4,192	4,558
Dar Châabane	35,859	42,140
El Haouaria	9,273	9,508
El Maâmoura	6,619	8,039
El Mida	3,437	4,155
Grombalia	18,856	24,299
Hammam Ghezèze	7,806	9,076
Hammamet	63,116	73,236
Kélibia	43,209	46,856
Korba	34,807	38,902
Korbous	3,551	3,532
Menzel Bouzelfa	15,670	18,551
Menzel Horr	4,798	5,243
Menzel Temime	34,528	39,138
Nabeul	56,387	70,437
Soliman	29,060	37,749
Somâa	6,287	7,017
Takelsa	20,169	22,151
Tazarka	7,613	9,388
Zaouief Djedidi	7,370	7,862

== Climate ==
Nabeul has an arid climate with steppe precipitation and hot arid temperature.

Climate data for Nabeul
Month	Jan	Feb	Mar	Apr	May	Jun	Jul	Aug	Sep	Oct	Nov	Dec	Year
Record high °C (°F)	24 (76)	23 (74)	28 (83)	27 (80)	29 (84)	36 (97)	39 (103)	41 (105)	37 (99)	34 (94)	26 (79)	23 (74)	41 (105)
Mean daily maximum °C (°F)	15 (59)	16 (60)	17 (62)	18 (65)	22 (71)	26 (79)	29 (85)	30 (86)	28 (82)	24 (76)	20 (68)	16 (61)	22 (71)
Mean daily minimum °C (°F)	9 (49)	10 (50)	11 (52)	19 (66)	17 (63)	21 (70)	24 (75)	24 (76)	23 (73)	19 (67)	15 (59)	11 (52)	17 (62)
Record low °C (°F)	2 (36)	2 (36)	4 (40)	7 (45)	11 (52)	16 (60)	17 (63)	19 (67)	15 (59)	9 (49)	6 (43)	3 (38)	2 (36)
Source: Weatherbase

== See also ==
- Cape Bon, the peninsula which forms the territory of the governorate
