= Sahel, Tunisia =

Area of central eastern Tunisia

Coordinates: 35°56′N 10°32′E

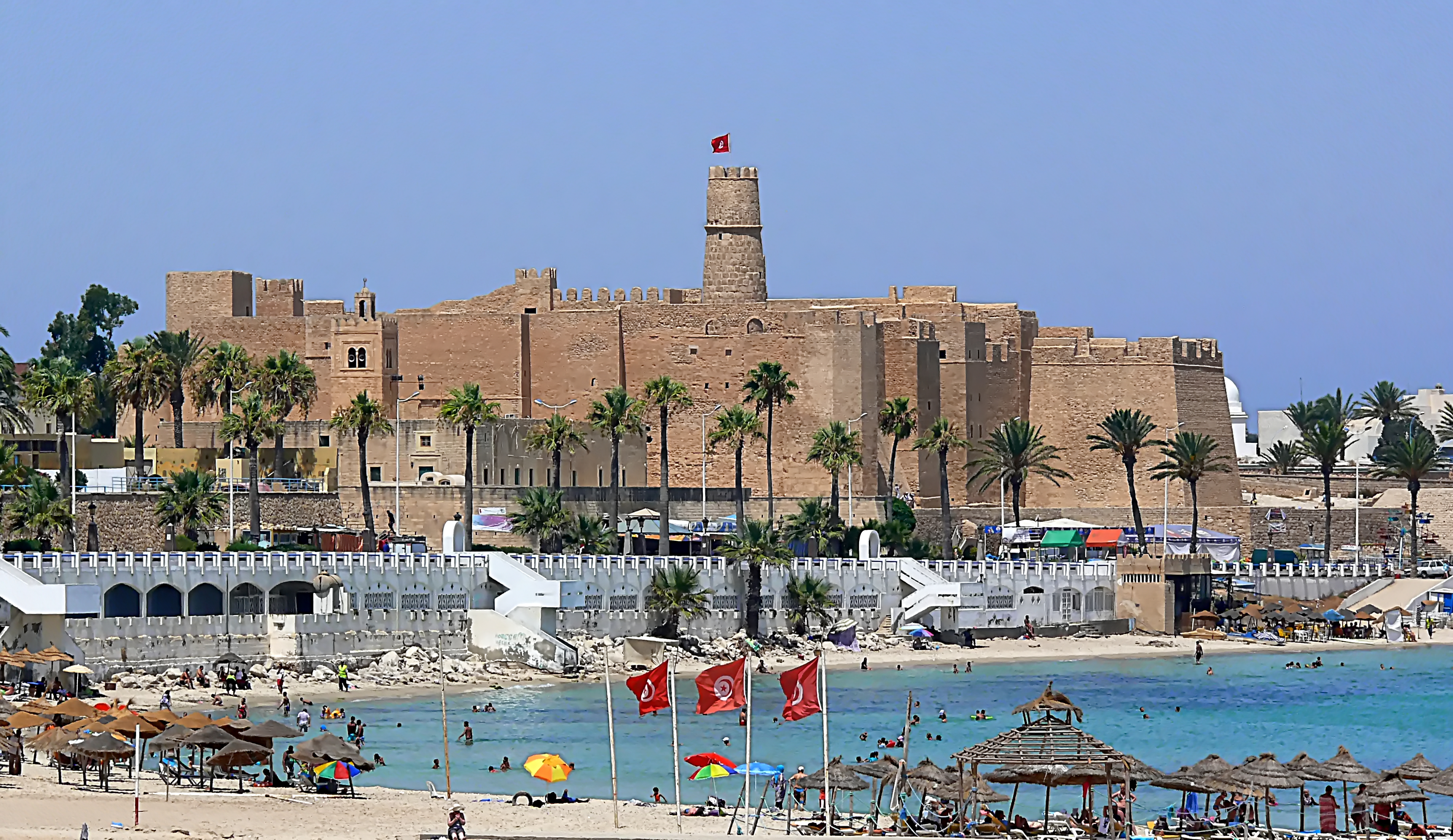
Ribat of Monastir

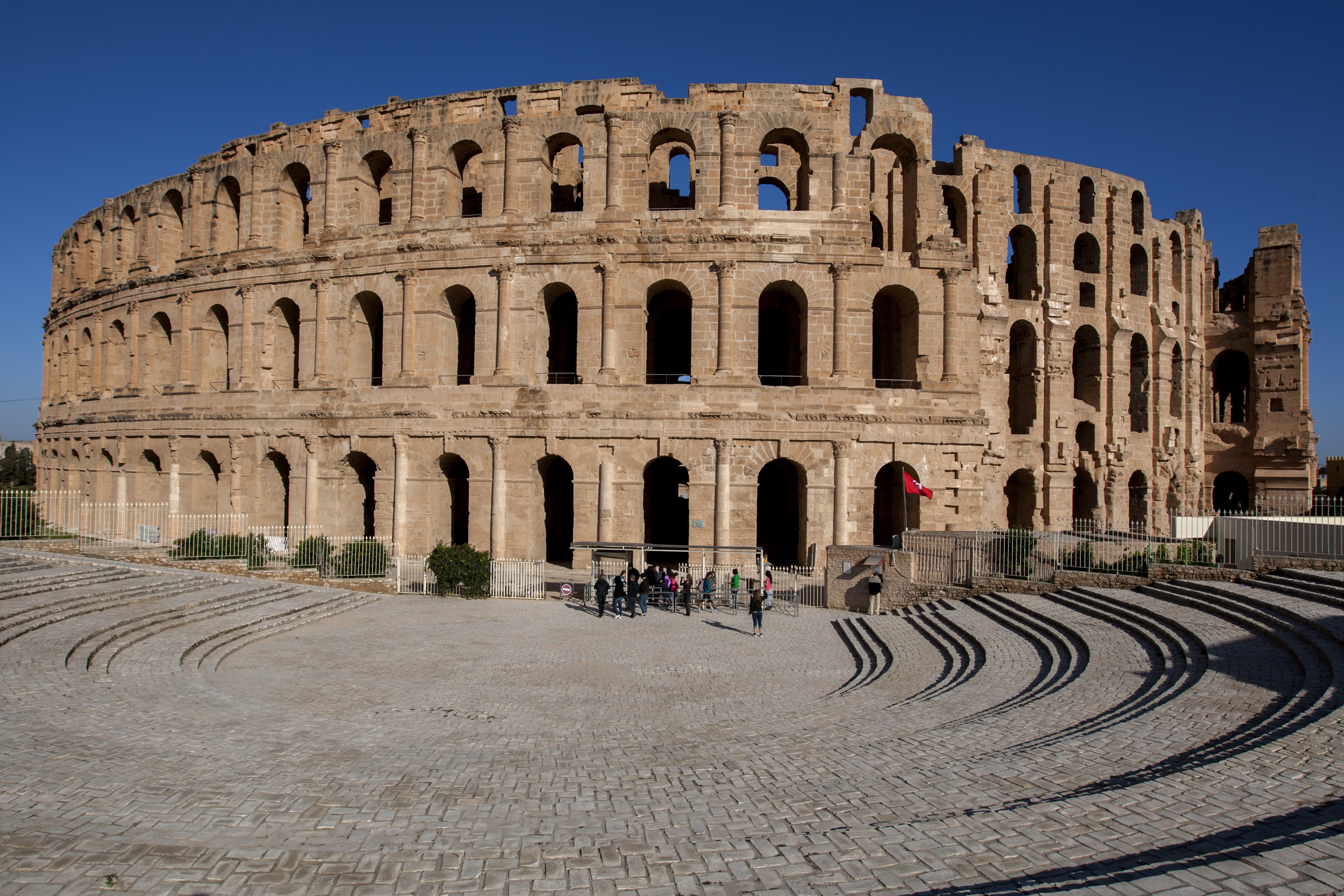
Amphitheatre of El Jem

The Tunisian Sahel (Arabic: الساحل) or more precisely the Central East Tunisia is an area of central eastern Tunisia and one of the six Tunisian regions. It stretches along the eastern shore, from Bouficha in the north to Melloulèche in the south, it includes 3 governorates: Sousse, Monastir and Mahdia. Its name derives from the Arabic word sāḥil (ساحل), meaning "shore" or "coast". The region's economy is based especially on tourism and it contains the second-biggest airport in Tunisia: Monastir Habib Bourguiba International Airport.

== Geography ==
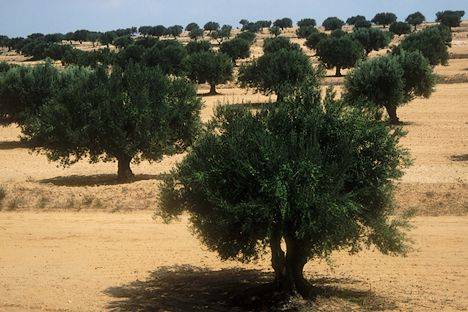
Olive orchard near Sfax

The Sahel extends inland to the hills which protect the low plains of the coast and are covered in olive plantations; the region's low rainfall is compensated for by the atmospheric humidity.

Since antiquity, it has formed a clear geographic unity with its own unique demographic and economic characteristics. Today it consists of the governorates of Sousse, Monastir and Mahdia.

Its geographic area is quite large: about 140 km from north to south and varying between twenty and sixty kilometres east to west. The total area is around 6,600 square kilometres (2,500 sq mi), 4.02% of the total surface area of Tunisia.

== History ==
Long inhabited, the area of the modern Tunisian Sahel seems to have been a distinct region dominated by urban settlements on the sea since antiquity; this tradition predates the region's conversion to Islam and Arabisation, but its continuity with region's Arab history is clear.

=== Phoenician settlement ===
Most of the cities of the Sahel were founded by the Phoenicians. Thus Hadrumetum was founded at the beginning of the 9th century BC by Tyre - even before Carthage. It gained importance in the following centuries, becoming one of the main Phoenician ports in the Western Mediterranean. The area was a key part of the Carthaginian empire, but after the Second Punic War it came under increasing Numidian influence. In 146 BC, after the Third Punic War, it became part of the new Roman province of Africa.

=== Rome and Byzantium ===
The Sahel was the location of one of the key battles of the War between Pompey and Caesar. Julius Caesar landed at Ruspina on 28 December 47 BC, marched to Thapsus and put it under siege at the end of February 46 BC. The Battle of Thapsus took place on 6 April and was a massive victory for Caesar and the city surrendered to him shortly after. Then he proceeded to take control of northern Tunisia.

Around 293 AD the Romans divided the province of Africa and the Sahel became its own province, named Byzacena, which was among the provinces ceded to the Vandals in 442. It was recaptured by the Eastern Roman Empire in the Vandalic War and then formed one of the seven provinces of the Exarchate of Africa, which stretched west to the Atlantic.

=== Caliphates ===
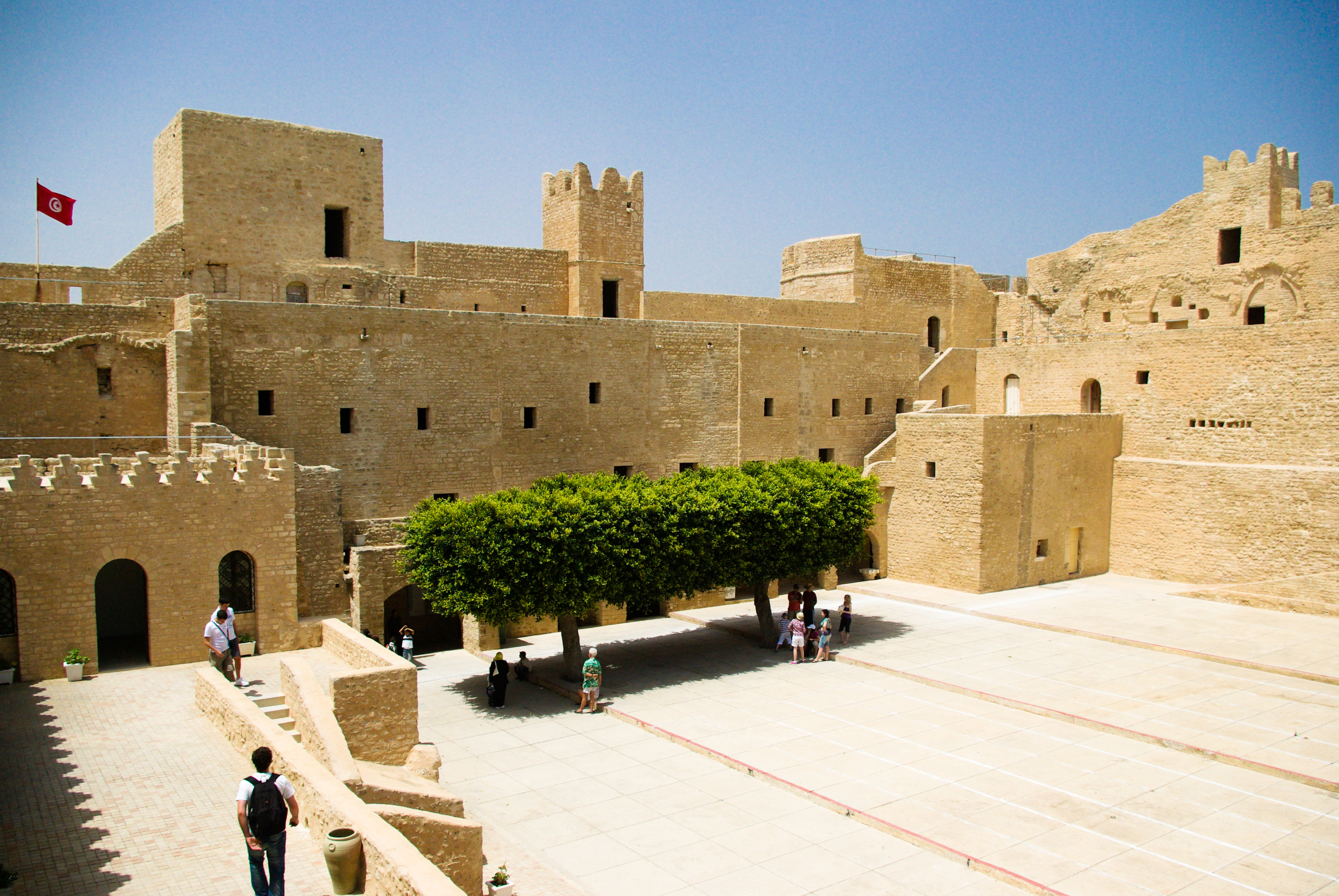
Ribat of Monastir

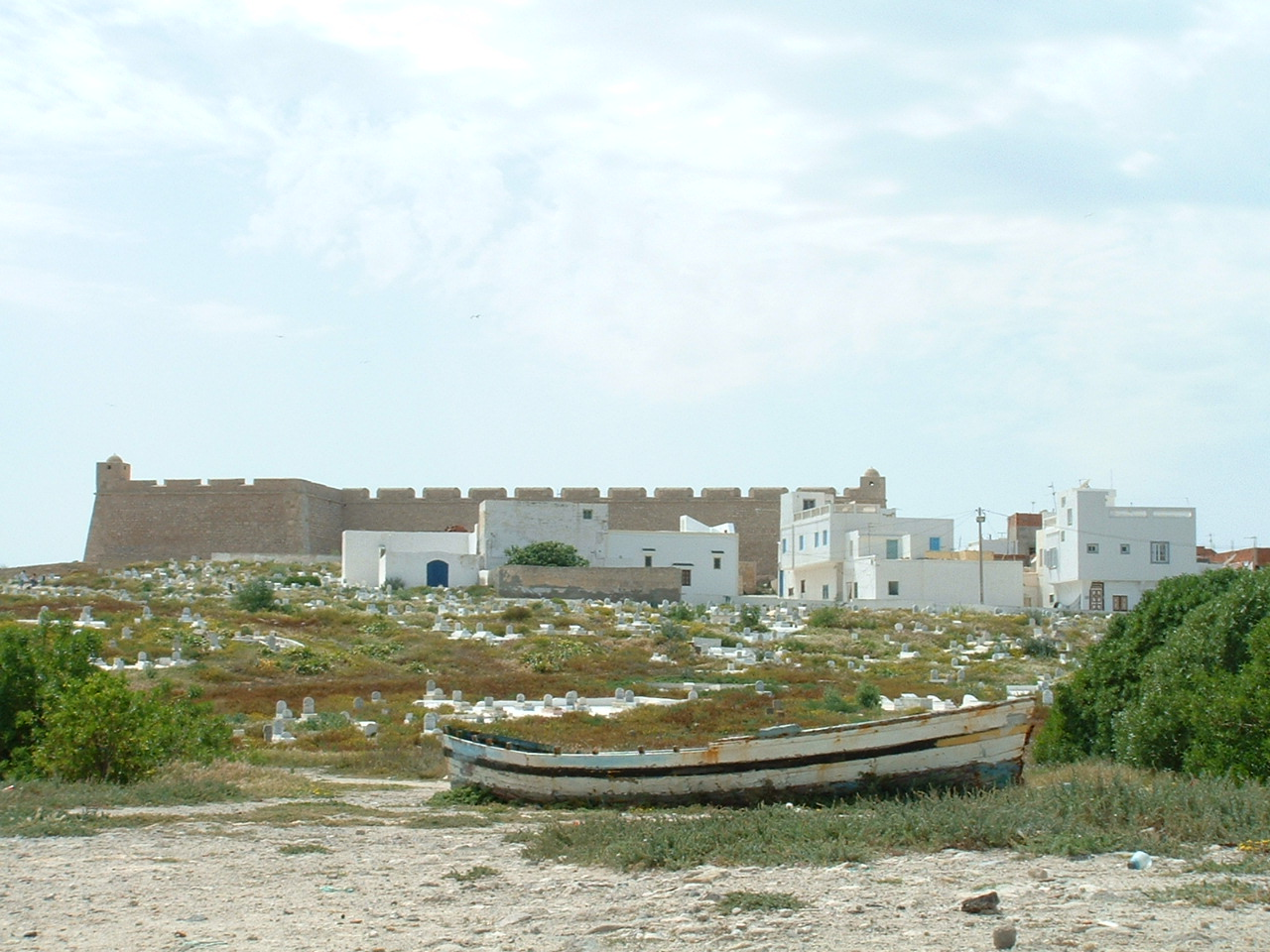
Fort of Mahdia

With the arrival of Islam and the establishment of the capital of Ifriqiya, Kairouan, in the region, the Sahel's maritime ports became the key to its security. This explains the construction of several ribats in the region, which served defensive, religious and Maraboutic purposes. The most important ribats are those of Monastir, built by governor Harthama ibn A'yun in 796, and of Sousse, built by the Aghlabid emirs.

=== African Emirates ===
The city of Sousse received a shipyard which played an important role in the conquest of Sicily, which was launched from it.

The foundation of Mahdia by the Fatamids in 916 gave the Sahel a key political role which continued under the Zirids. Kairouan lost some of its religious role to Monastir, where figures including the Zirid princes and Imam Mezri were buried. Mahdia became the seat of a splendid court which drew poets from across the Maghreb, Al-Andalus and Sicily. However, the invasion of Banu Hilal plunged the region into chaos and Tunisia fractured into numerous taifas; only the Sahel remained under Zirid control. Even Sousse broke away from their power, adopting a republican government. The invasion led to the further urbanisation of the region, with the establishment of many villages which still exist today. A little later the region suffered from Norman attacks – Mahdia was taken in 1148 by troops of Roger II of Sicily – until the arrival of the Almohads in 1160. After this period the Sahel experienced a decline in importance following the transfer of the capital to Tunis.

=== Beylik of Tunis ===
In the 19th century, the Sahel was divided into two qaidates, one based at Sousse and the other at Monastir, which occupied approximately the same area as the modern Tunisian governorates of Monastir and Mahdia. They were alternatively called awtan (plural of watan, meaning "district"), individually watan Susah and watan al'Munastir. The two qaidates were awarded only to individuals close to the beys. Often both positions were controlled by a single individual, as was the case with the grand viziers Shakir al-Taba'a (1836) and Mohammed Khaznadar (1851), who was also named "Mohammed governor of the Sahel" (Mohammed 'amil as-Sahil). The majority of the cities and villages of the Sahel revolted against the Bey in 1864. After this, the general Ahmed Zarrouk imposed a heavy tribute (financed by the sail of goods and property) and confiscated large areas of olive plantation.

=== French protectorate ===
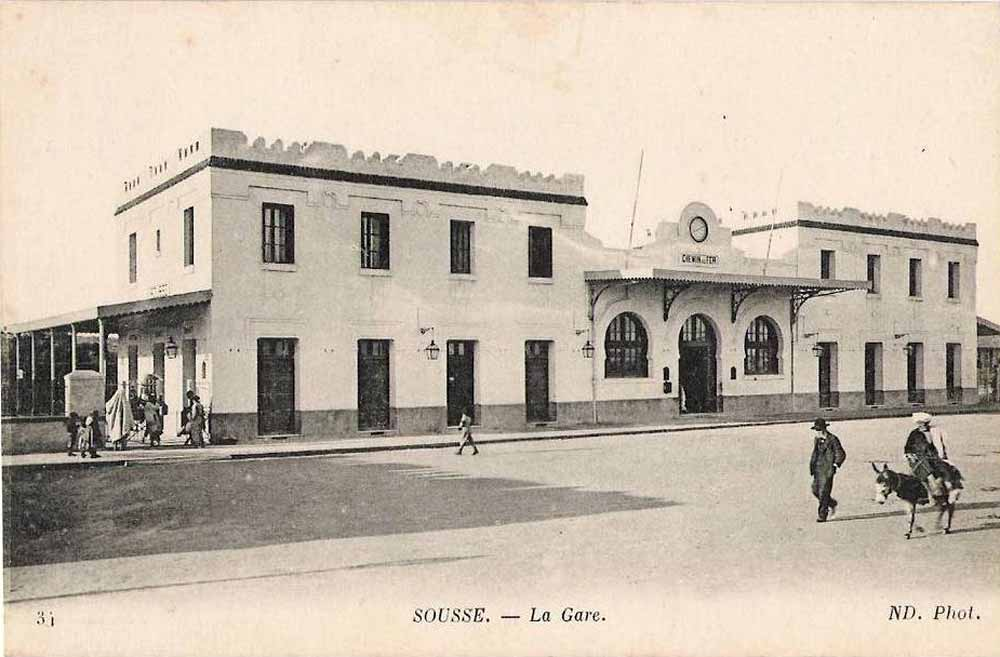
Train station, Sousse

After the establishment of a French protectorate, the new power established the qaidate of Jemmal (which took part of modern Monastir and Mahdia governorates) and centralised the region at Sousse which became the seat of civil government, contributing to the weakening of the other regional centres.

=== Modern Tunisia ===
After independence, the government of Neo Destour ended the Sahel's administrative union during the abolition of the qaidates and establishment of the modern system of governorates. The whole region was under the control of the governor of Sousse from 1956 to 1974, when the governorates of Monastir and Mahdia were created.

== Cities ==
- Akouda
- Bekalta
- Bembla
- Beni Hassen
- Bennane
- Bouhjar
- Boumerdes
- Chebba
- Chorbane
- Chott Meriem
- El Bradâa
- El Jem
- El Masdour
- Enfida
- Hammam Sousse
- Hebira
- Hergla
- Jemmal
- Kalâa Kebira
- Kalâa Seghira
- Kerker
- Khniss
- Kondar
- Ksar Hellal
- Ksibet El Mediouni
- Ksour Essef
- Lamta
- Mahdia
- Malloulech
- Menzel Kamel
- Moknine
- Monastir
- M'saken
- Messaadine
- Ouardanine
- Ouled Chamekh
- Rejich
- Sahline Moôtmar
- Salakta
- Sayada
- Sidi Ameur
- Sidi Alouane
- Sidi Bou Ali
- Sidi El Hani
- Souassi
- Sousse
- Takrouna
- Téboulba
- Zaouiet Kontoch
- Zeramdine

== Demographics ==
The Sahel has long been characterised by a large population; its three governorates contain inhabitants of 1,634,611 million peoples The region is thus the Third most populous in Tunisia after North East Tunisia region and South East Tunisia.

== Economy ==
The Sahel occupies a central position on the Mediterranean Sea and is one of the country's most important areas for bathing and tourism on account of the large number of beaches. The cities of Monastir and Sousse are key tourist centres and Mahdia has been attempting to develop its tourist industry since the 1990s. It is home to the Monastir Habib Bourguiba International Airport, which is the busiest airport in the country in terms of passenger numbers and has the most charter flights of any airport in Africa. There is a commercial port at Sousse, numerous fishing ports and two marinas (Port El Kantaoui and Cap Monastir).

The A1 crosses the region from north to south and there are two railways (national and regional).

== Transport ==
The public transport authority for bus travel within and between the cities of the Sahel is the Société de transport du Sahel (STS), which has its headquarters at Sousse and is divided into three regional branches corresponding to the three governorates. The Sahel Metro is the regional railway line, making several trips daily between Mahdia and Sousse.

The Sahel is an important part of the Tunisian autoroute network, with a major node of the A1 at M'saken, which continues north for 140 km to Tunis and south for 98 km to Sfax. A parallel route runs along the coast.

== Sport ==
The region's name is used by the omnisports club of Sousse, the Étoile sportive du Sahel. The club is supported throughout the region and is one of the most popular sporting clubs in the country. The football club Étoile Sportive du Sahel has achieved several continental victories. The second famous and historical omnisports team in the region is US Monastir located in Monastir since 1923 under the name of Ruspina Sports that was changed in 1942 by Union Sportive Monastirienne. The club was known as the club of the first president of Tunisia native from Monastir Habib Bourguiba who was seen present in Mustapha Ben Jannet stadium for many times. The football club plays in the first division of Tunisian league and has no national and continental title, and the basketball team has won several Tunisian titles and one continental title.

The region is also known for handball, the second most popular sport in Tunisia. The region is home to several handball clubs, of which the most important are the Étoile Sportive du Sahel H.C., El Makarem de Mahdia and SC Moknine.

== Famous individuals ==
=== Politics ===
- Abdelwahab Abdallah
- Zine El Abidine Ben Ali
- Hedi Baccouche
- Habib Bourguiba
- Abdelaziz Ben Dhia
- Amor Rourou
- Mohamed Ghannouchi
- Idriss Guiga
- Hamadi Jebali
- Mohamed Jegham
- Hamed Karoui
- Habib Chatty
- Kamel Morjane
- Mohammed Mzali
- Hedi Nouira
- Rachid Sfar
- Bechir Tekkari

=== Sciences and letters ===
- M'hamed Hassine Fantar
- Youssef Rzouga

=== Sports ===
- Abdelmajid Chetali

== Bibliography ==
- Ridha Lamine, Villes et citadins du Sahel central, Faculté des lettres et sciences humaines de Sousse / L'Or du Temps, Sousse / Tunis, 2001
- Abdellatif Mrabet, Du Byzacium au Sahel, L'Or du Temps, Tunis, 1998
- Xavier Thyssen, Des manières d'habiter dans le Sahel tunisien, Centre national de la recherche scientifique, Paris, 1983
