= Mansoura, Tunisia =

Mansoura
- Location in Tunisia
- Coordinates: 35°18′N 10°36′E
- Country: Tunisia
- Governorate: Mahdia Governorate
- Time zone: UTC1 (CET)

Mansoura is a town in Tunisia situated 8 kilometres from Souassi and el Djem.

== See also ==
- El-Mansoura, a coastal town in Nabeul Governorate
