= Hiboun =

Coordinates: 35°31′N 11°02′E

Hiboun هيبون
- Commune and town
- Interactive map of Hiboun
- Country: Tunisia
- Governorate: Mahdia Governorate
- Time zone: UTC+1 (CET)

Hiboun is a town and commune in the Mahdia Governorate, Tunisia, located in Sahel, Tunisia region south of Monastir and southeast of Sousse in tourist area and contain many hotels and nightclubs and universities. As of 2009 it had a population of 23,241.

Located at the northwestern entrance of Mahdia, the area remained a predominantly agricultural village—focused on olives, fruits, and vegetables—until the early 1970s. Its urban development experienced significant acceleration during the 1980s and 1990s and continues to this day. This growth is driven by the establishment of Mahdia's new tourist zone, the expansion of the city, and the opening of higher education institutions, such as the Faculty of Economics and Management in 2000 and the Higher Institute of Computer Science of Mahdia in 2018.

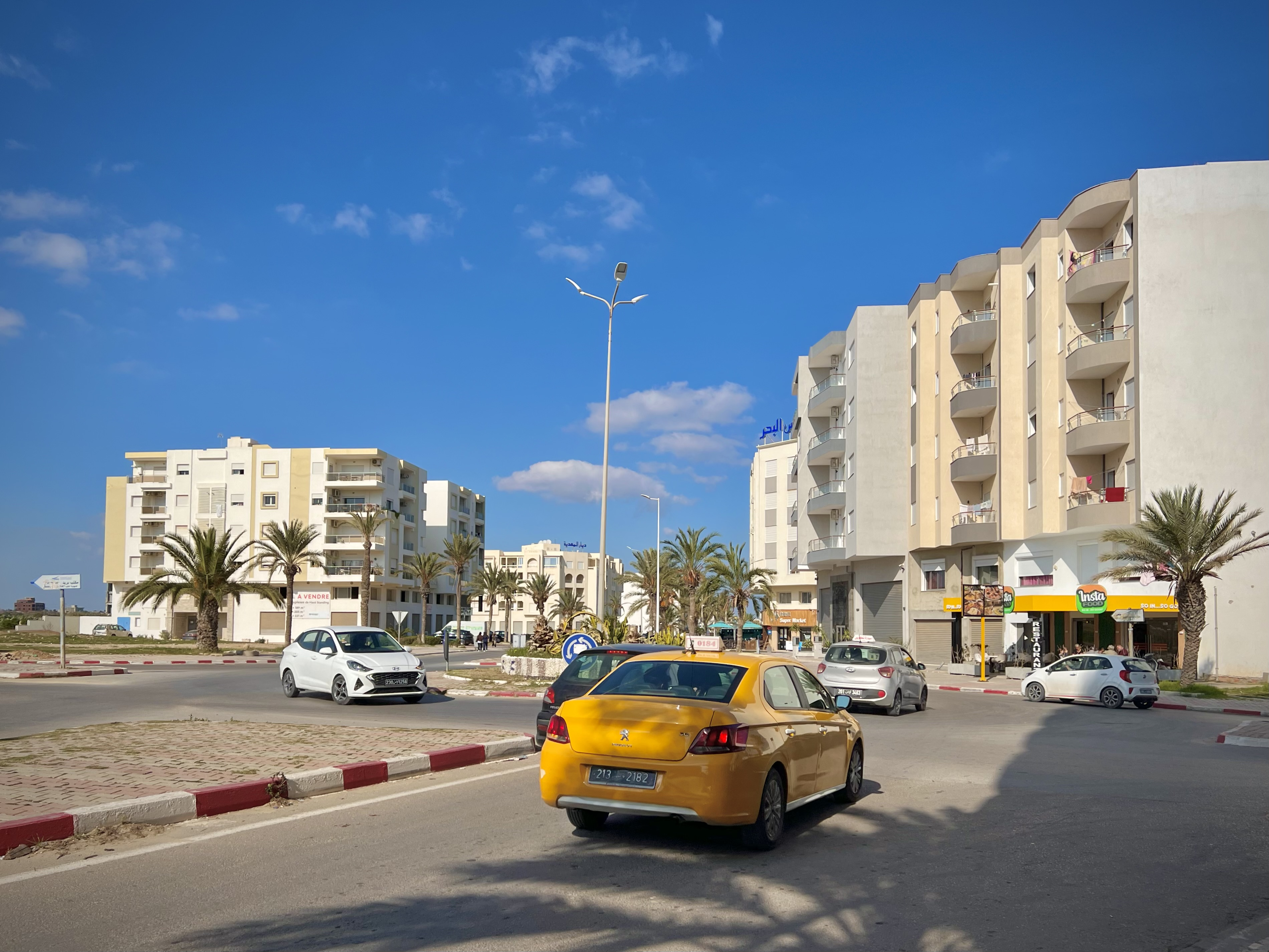
Street scene in Hiboun, 2024

== See also ==
- List of cities in Tunisia
