= A1 motorway (Tunisia) =

Road connecting Tunis and Ben Guerdane

Coordinates: 34.248136°N 10.036011°E

A1 motorway

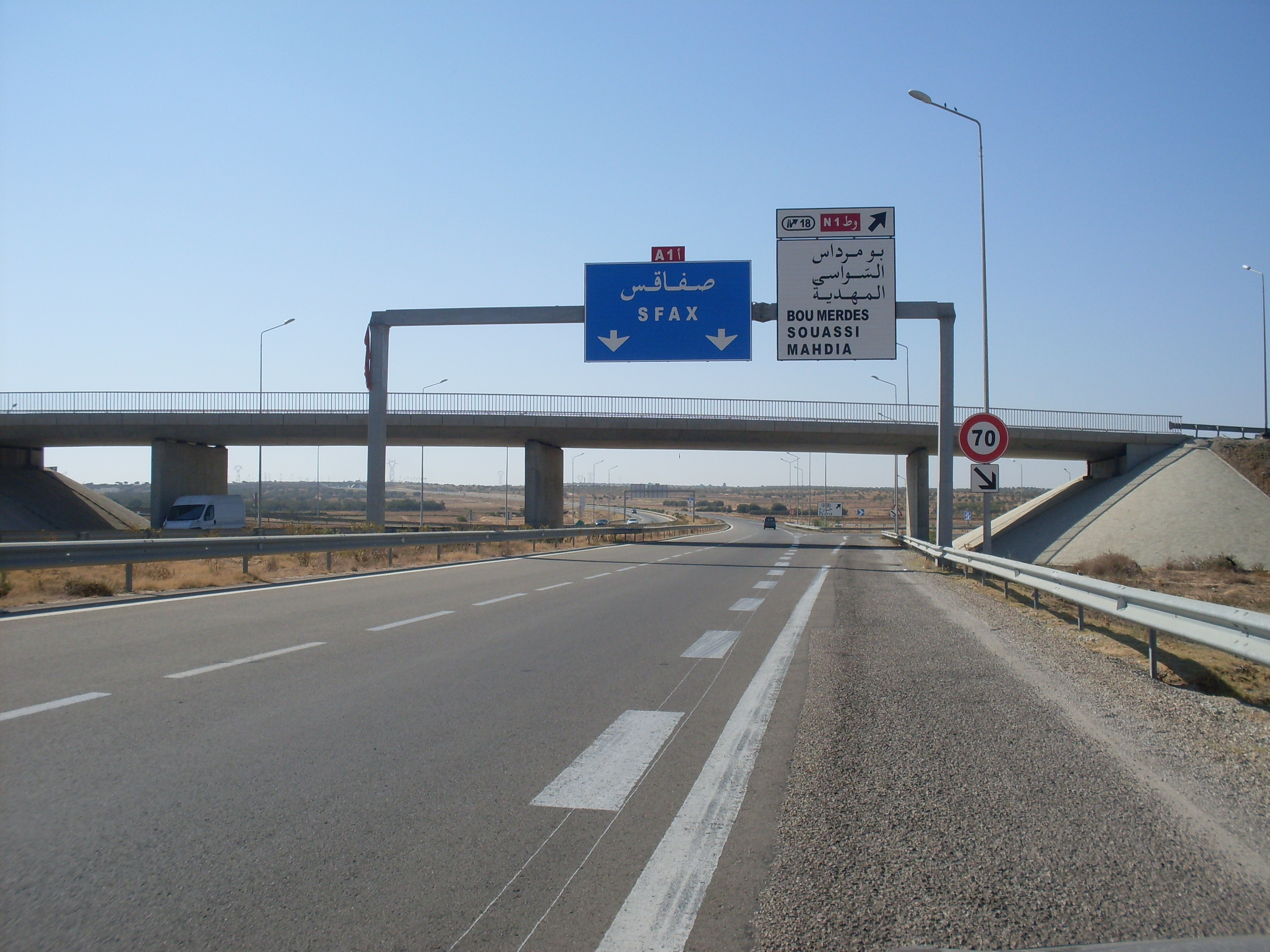

Route information
- Length: 659 km (409 mi)
- Existed: 1981–present

Major junctions
- North end: Tunis
- South end: Ben Guerdane

Location
- Country: Tunisia
- Major cities: Tunis, Ben Arous, Hammam Lif, Hammamet, Enfida, Sousse, El Jem, Sfax, Gabès, Medenine, Ben Guerdane

Highway system
- Transport in Tunisia; Motorways

Tunisia's A1 or A-1 motorway is a 659 km road connecting Tunis and Ben Guerdane. In the map shown, the A-1 is in red. The highway was built from Tunis at the north end toward the south and is continuing to be extended to finally reach the Tunisian Libyan border.

The A-1 is conceived of as part of an international project, sometimes called the Trans-Maghreb or Trans-North Africa Highway or Trans-African Highway 1 that is planned to reach from Cairo to Dakar.

There are three lanes each way from Tunis to Hammamet then two lanes each way from Hammamet to Sfax. It is a toll road part of the way. Road signs are in Arabic and French. The speed limit on Tunisian highways is 110 km/h.

== History ==
The first section connected Tunis to Turki (near Grombalia) in 1981. It was extended to Hammamet in 1986, to Enfidha in 1994, to Sfax in 2008, and to Gabes in 2019.

== Further construction ==
The extension to Gabes took a long time: progress slowed after the Tunisian revolution of 2011 and the European Investment Bank provided with some financial support for extensions, starting in 2014.

In January 2023, advancement of the remaining 182 km from Gabès to Medenine, Ben Gardane, and to Ras Jedir on the Libyan border was estimated to be 90% completed at cost of 550 million dinars, with already 5 interchanges, 4 toll stations, 4 restop areas, and 107 hydraulic structures already built on the Gabes-Medenine section. Opening is planned for the end of May 2023.

== Distances, rest areas, and exits ==
The planned route from Tunis to the Libyan frontier is 573 km:

- Tunis-Hammamet (51 km)
- Hammamet-M'saken (92 km) with an exit at Sousse
- M'saken-Sfax (97 km) with an exit at Mahdia
- Sfax-Gabès (151 km, under development)
- Gabès-Libyan border (182 km, planned for 2018)

There are service areas at Grombalia, Sidi Khelifa, Borjine, and El Jem.

Exits and interchanges are, in order: the interchange between A1 and Olympic City November 7th, Hammam Lif, Mornag, Grombalia, Turki, Hammamet-Nord, Golf Hammamet, Hammamet, Hammamet-Sud, Bouficha, Enfidha, Enfidha–Hammamet International Airport, Hergla, Sidi Bou Ali, Kalâa Kebira, Sousse, Sousse city center, M'saken, Jemmel, Kerker, El Jem, El Hencha, and Sfax-Nord

== Gallery ==
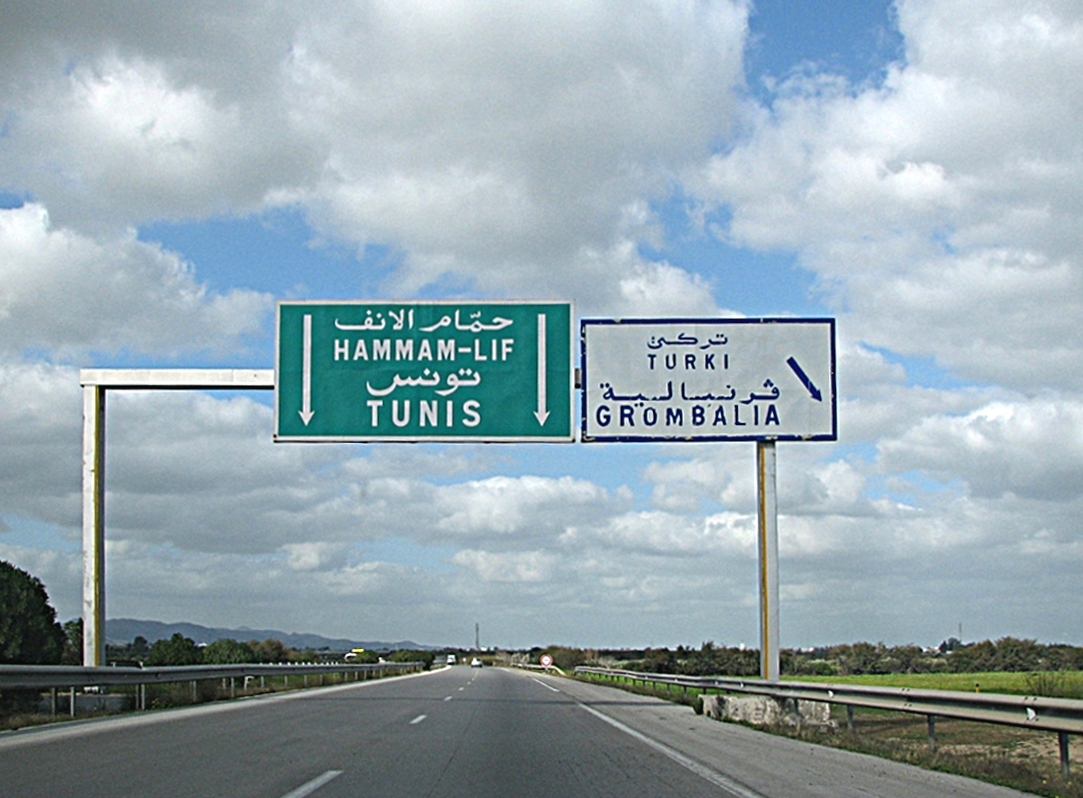
Exit to Turki/Grombalia

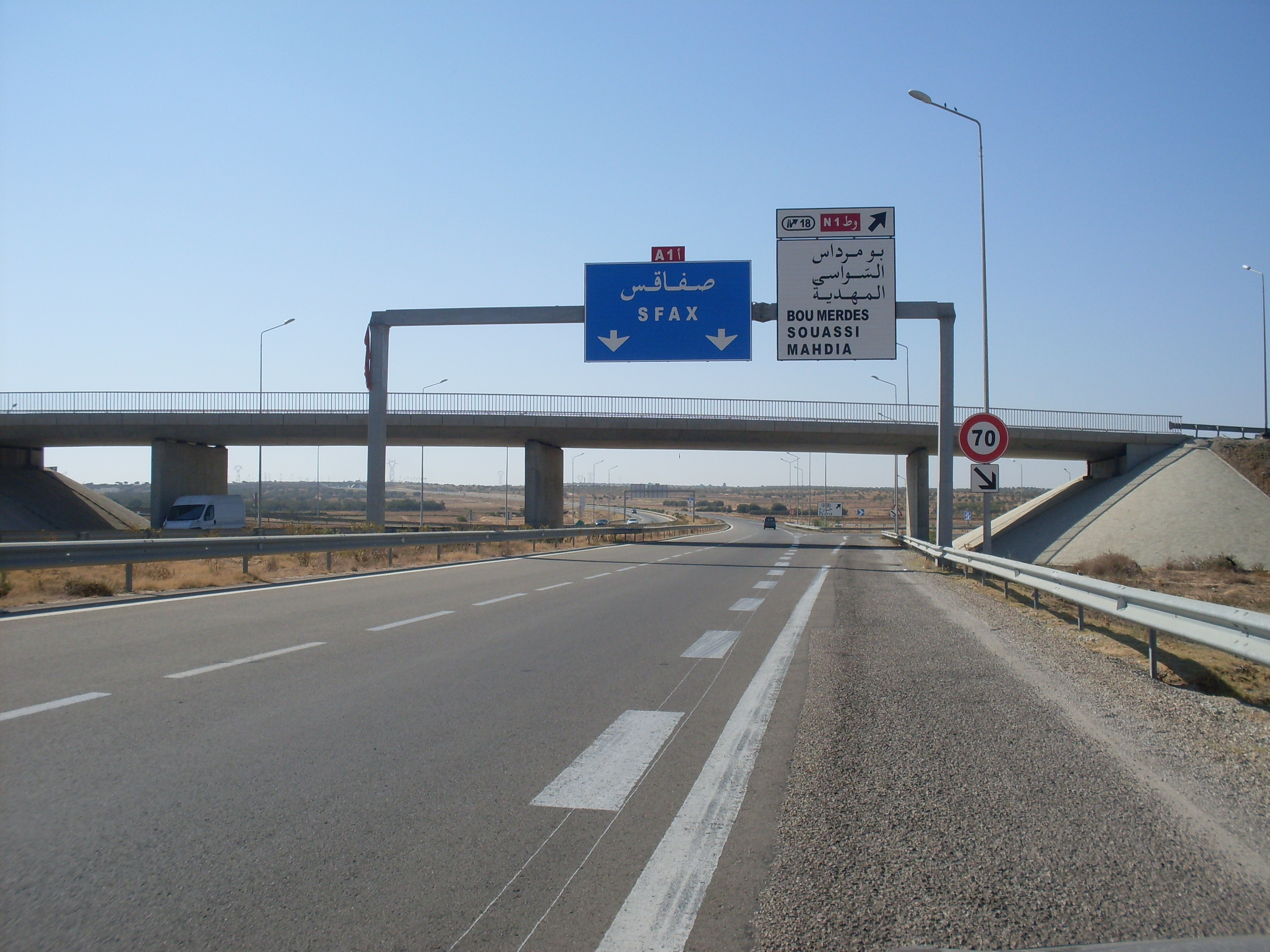
Exit to Bou Merdes

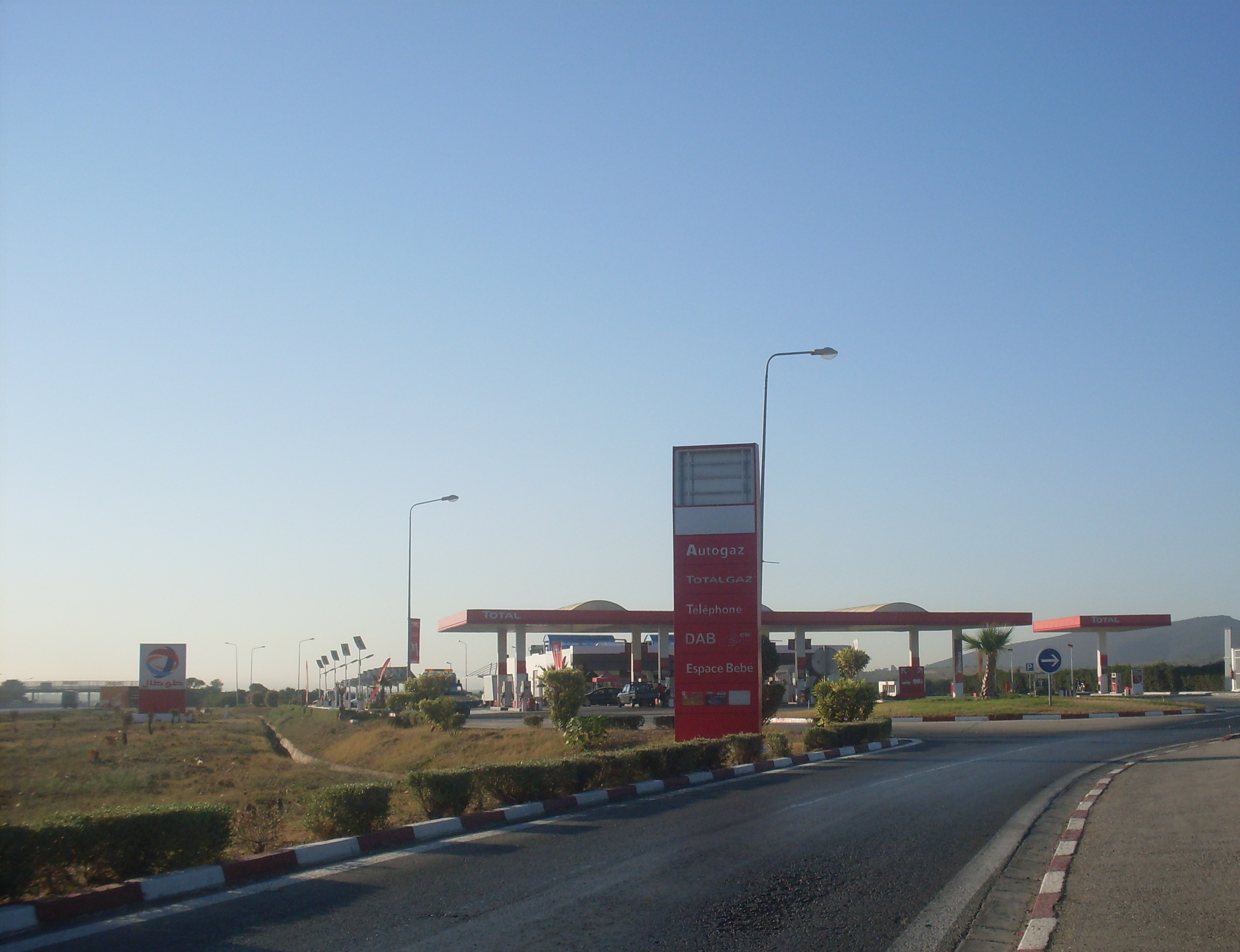
Rest area at Grombalia

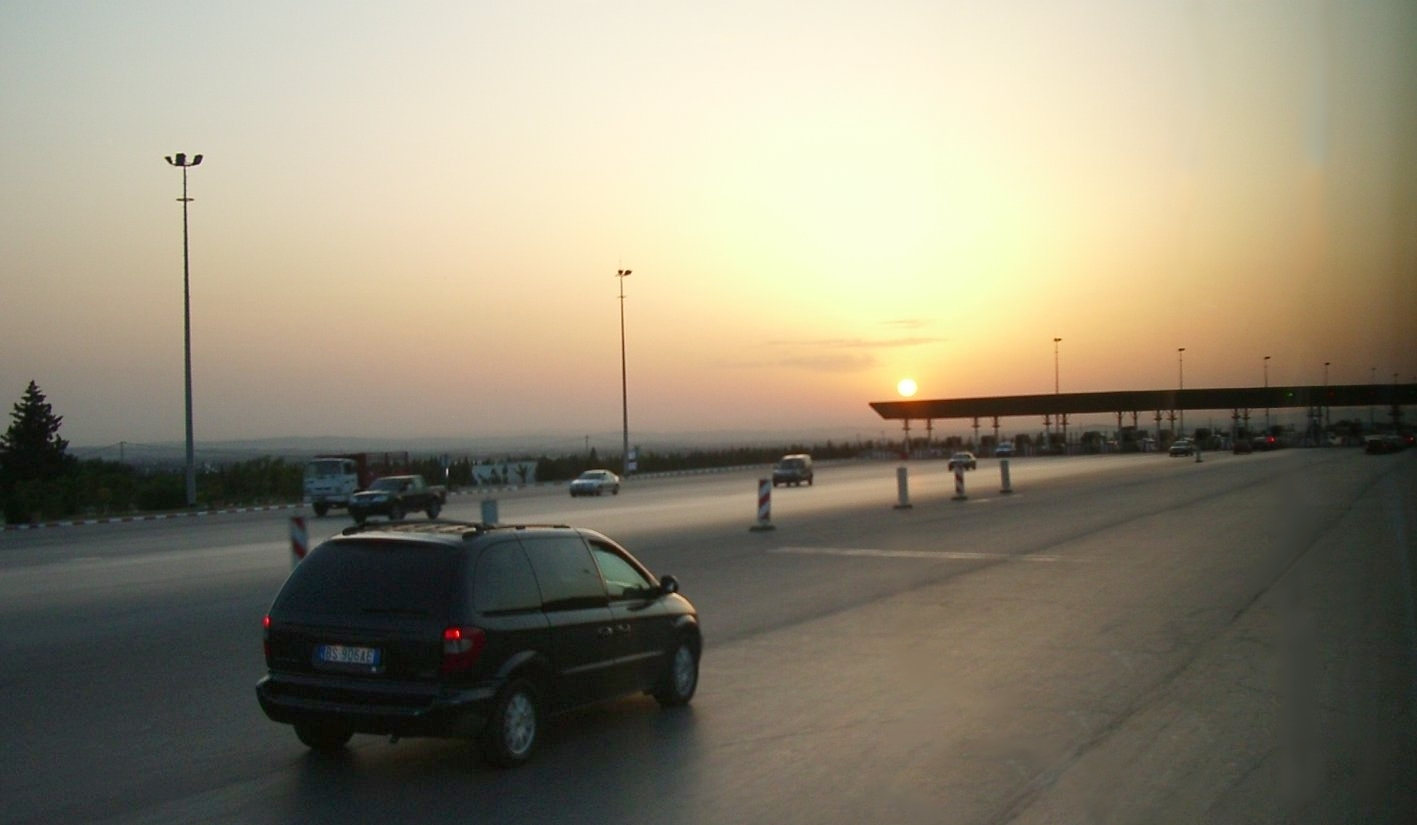
A1 toll in Mornag at sunset

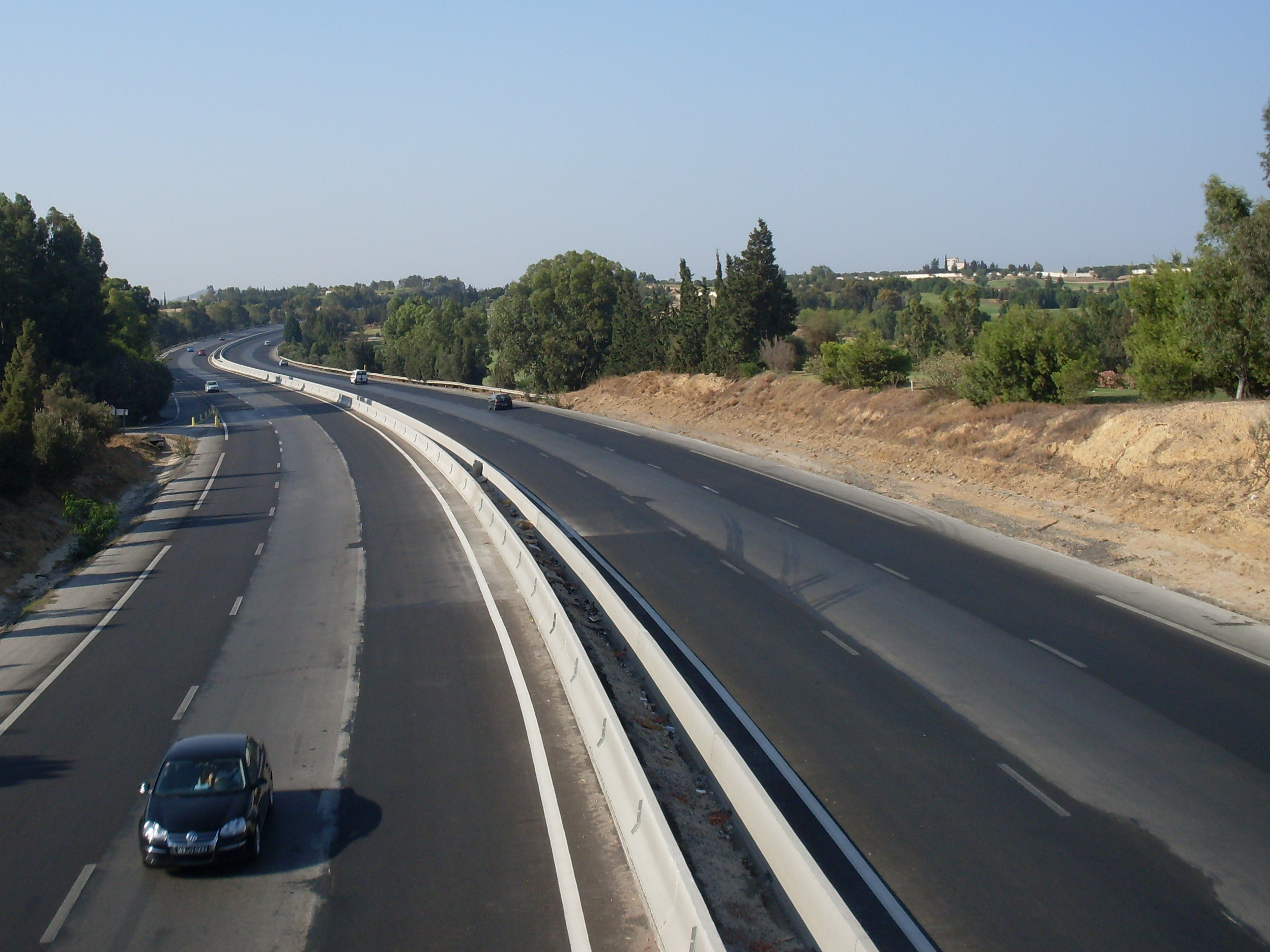

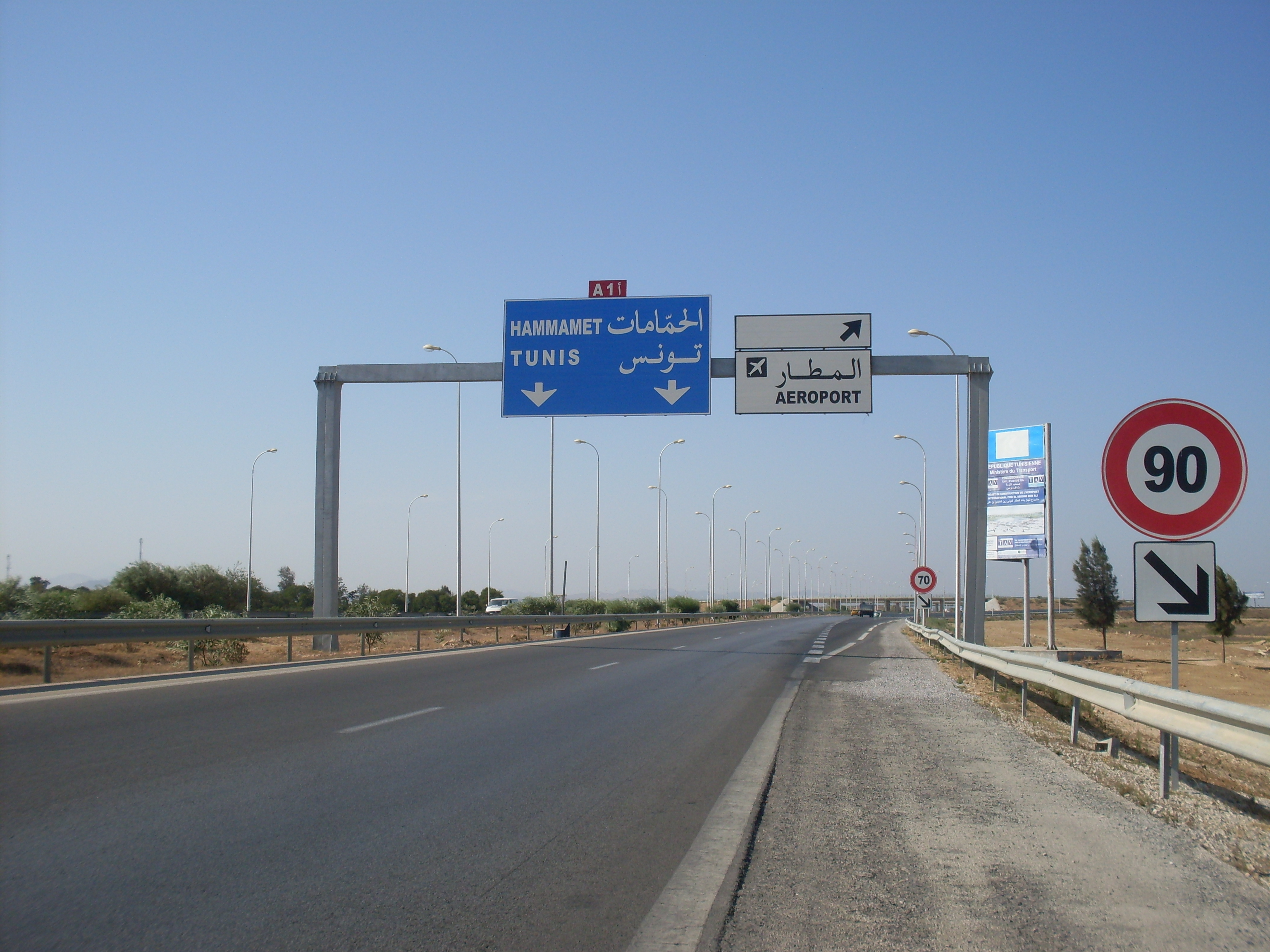
Exit to the Enfidha–Hammamet International Airport

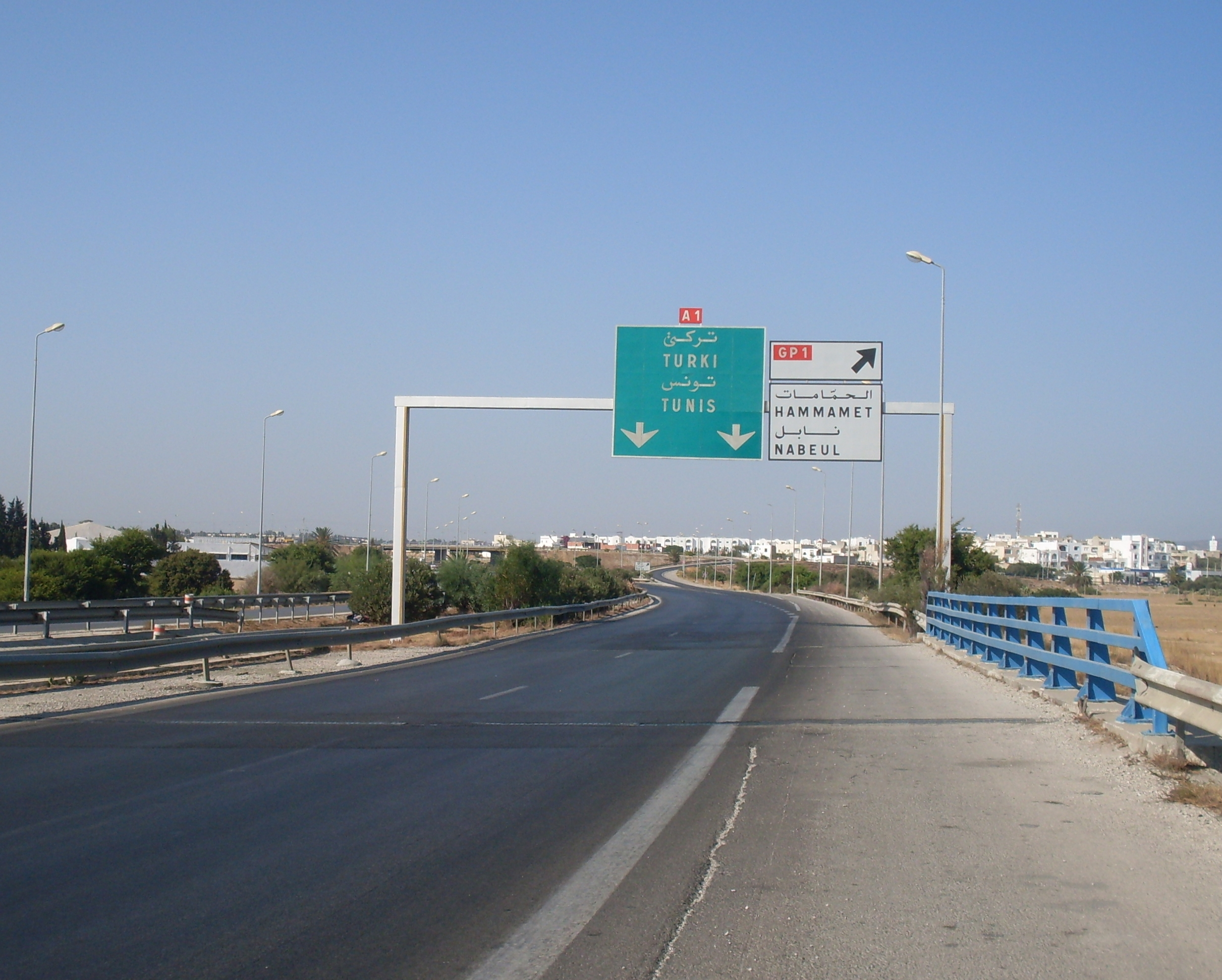
Exit to Hammamet

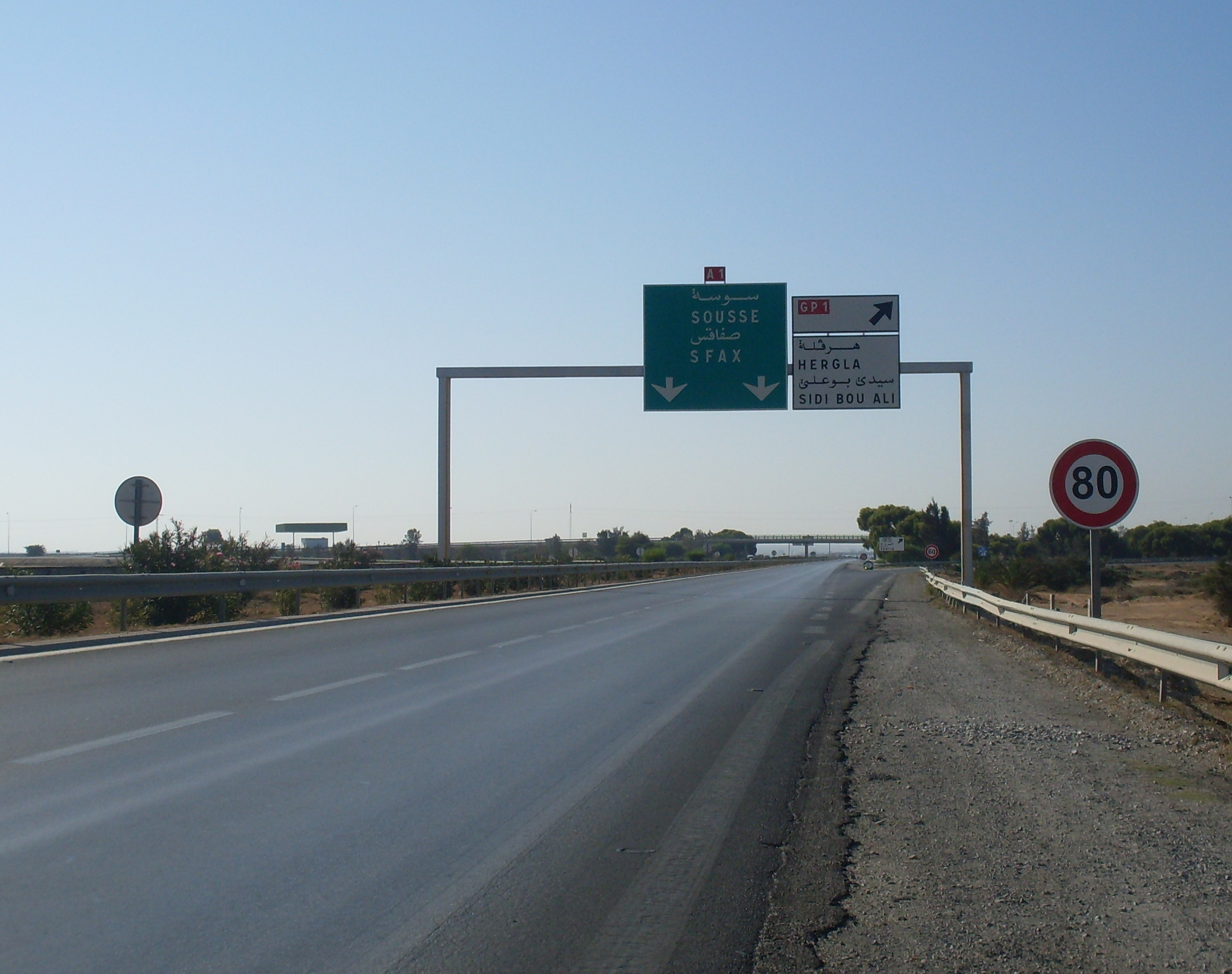
Exit to Hergla
