= Youssef Rzouga =

Tunisian writer and poet

- Born: March 21, 1957 (age 69); Zorda, Tunisia
- Education: Faculty of Letters and Human Sciences of Tunis, Institut de presse et des sciences de l'information
- Occupations: Poet, writer, journalist
- Writing career
- Language: Arabic, French
- Period: 1973–present
- Genres: Poetry, prose
- Notable works: I'm distinguished from you by my grievances, The program of the Rose, The Wolf in the Word
- Notable awards: Tunisian Ministry of Culture Award (1981, 1986, 1999); National Merit Award in the Cultural Field (2000); Aboulkacem Chebbi Prize (2003); King Abdallah II’s Creativity Prize (2004)

Youssef Rzouga is a Tunisian writer and poet, born on March 21, 1957 in Zorda, Tunisia. He began writing in 1967. His first published text was "Something called need," a short story in the magazine Radio et Télévision (1973).

== Education ==
Rzouga studied at the School of Zorda in Sidi Alouane. He continued his education at Ksour Essef secondary school and the school of Sousse. He received the following degrees:

- Master’s Degree in Journalism and information sciences (Political sciences).
- Diploma in Russian language from the Faculty Patrice Lumumba, Moscow.
- Postgraduate Diploma in Political sciences from the Faculté des droits et des sciences politiques of Tunis.
- Theories of art and aesthetics Postgraduate Diploma, from the Institut supérieur de Beaux-arts of Tunis.
- Postgraduate Diploma, journalism and information sciences.

== Career ==
- Editor of El-Amal, a daily paper (1980-1982)
- From 1982-1987 he was the Chief Editor of the Ministry of Culture's magazine Ach’er (La poésie)
- Editor of the daily paper Elhoria (1987-1989)
- Chief editor of the Aljil Aljadid magazine (1990-1992)
- Since 1989, Rzouga has been the Chief editor of the literary supplement Warakat Thakafiya of the Tunisian daily paper Essahafa.

== Honours and awards ==
Rzouga has been achieved several awards, including the Tunisian Ministry of Culture award 3 times:

- 1981: Award of the ministry of Culture for his poetic book I’m distinguished from you by my grievances
- 1986: Award of the ministry of Culture for his poetic book The program of the rose.
- 1999: Award of the ministry of Culture for his poetic book The Wolf in the Word.
- 2000: National merit award in the cultural field
- 2002: Youssef Rzouga Award of Poetry (A yearly Poetic Prize started in 2002, awarded to the best young poet within the framework of The Meeting of Greater on literary creation).
- 2003: Aboulkacem Chebbi Prize for his poetic book: Flowers of Dioxyde of History.
- 2003: The Pen of the Poet Youssef Rzouga (A yearly Poetic Prize started in July 2003 in Sidi Alouan).
- 2004: Prize of the gouvernorat of Mahdia for his poetic book: Emergency Case Declaration.
- 2004: King Abdallah II’s creativity Prize / Jordan.
- President of the club Mercredi littéraire in Tunis since 1988.
- Member of the Union of Tunisian Writers
- Member of the Union of Arab Writers
- Member of the Tunisian Association of Journalists

== Works ==
Youssef Rzouga has written many poems and prose pieces:

- I'm distinguished from you by my grievances (1979)
- The program of the Rose (1985)
- The Astrolabe of Youssef the traveler (1986)
- The Wolf in the Word (1998)
- The Country Between the Hands (2001)
- Flowers of Dioxyde of History (2001)
- Emergency Case Declaration (2002)
- The Butterfly and the Dynamite (2004)
- Yogana (The Book of Poetic Yoga) (2004)
- Poetical Works (Volume I)... (2003)

== Critical reviews ==
- The Garden and its surroundings (Aspects of the career of the poet Youssef Rzouga, 224 pages) By: Khaled Mejri and Chawki Anizi
- Globalization and poetic Language in Flowers of Dioxyde of History by Maher Derbel and Abderrazek Kolsi.
- The Troubadour of Modern Times, edited by Walid Soliman.
- The Half-open Door, by Hafedh Mahfoudh.
- Down with the mask, by Chamseddine Ouni.
- The orchestra of the poet in Emergency Case Declaration by Houyem Ferchichi.
