= Mornag =

Mornag مرناق
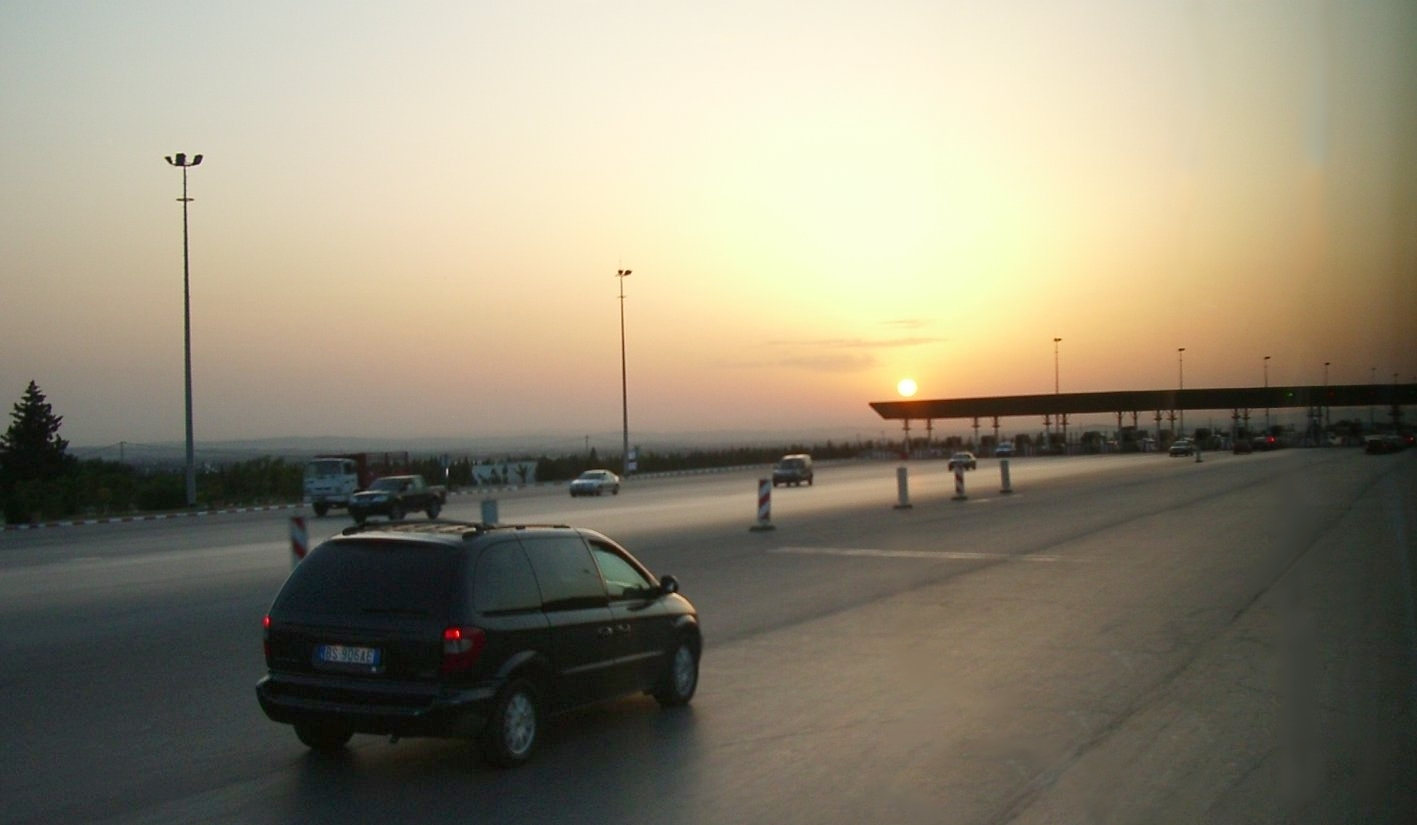

- Location in Tunisia
- Coordinates: 36°41′5″N 10°1′37″E
- Country: Tunisia
- Governorate: Ben Arous Governorate

Population (2022)
  - Total: 44,737

Mornag is a small town and commune in Tunisia. As of 2014 it had a population of 61,518. It lies along the A1 motorway.

Mornag is mainly known for its agricultural plain dedicated to the vineyard and the olive tree. It is one of the richest plains of Tunisia which covers 36,812 hectares including 19,900 hectares of arable land. Dominated by a summit, the Jebel Ressas (795 meters3), the town is crossed by Wadi Miliane and Wadi El Hamma and the Medjerda - Cap-Bon canal.
