= Ouled Chamekh =

Coordinates: 35°29′29″N 10°18′58″E

Ouled Chamekh (أولاد الشامخ)
- Commune and town
- Interactive map of Ouled Chamekh
- Country: Tunisia
- Governorate: Mahdia Governorate

Population (2014)
  - Total: 5,122
- Time zone: UTC+1 (CET)

Ouled Chamekh is a town and commune in the Mahdia Governorate, Tunisia. As of 2004 it had a population of 5,093.

The town is situated at 35°29'29"N, 10°18'58"E southwest of sebkha Sidi El Hani between Essouassi and Kairouan and is the capital of a delegation of 22,732 inhabitants. The name means "son of Chamekh" which reflects the settlement of nomads tribes of the high steppes of Tunisia in this area. The Mayor is Lotfi Ben Ali.

== See also ==
- List of cities in Tunisia
