= Essouassi =

- Commune and town
- Location within Tunisia
- Coordinates: 35°20′41″N 10°32′54″E
- Country: Tunisia
- Governorate: Mahdia Governorate

Population (2022)
  - Total: 5,381
- Time zone: UTC+1 (CET)
- Website: commune-souassi.gov.tn

Essouassi or Souassi (Arabic: السواسي) is a town and commune in the Mahdia Governorate, Tunisia. As of 2004 it had a population of 4,633.

== See also ==
- Mansoura
- El Djem
- List of cities in Tunisia
