= Kerker =

Coordinates: 35°28′54″N 10°38′31″E

Kerker كركر
- Commune and town
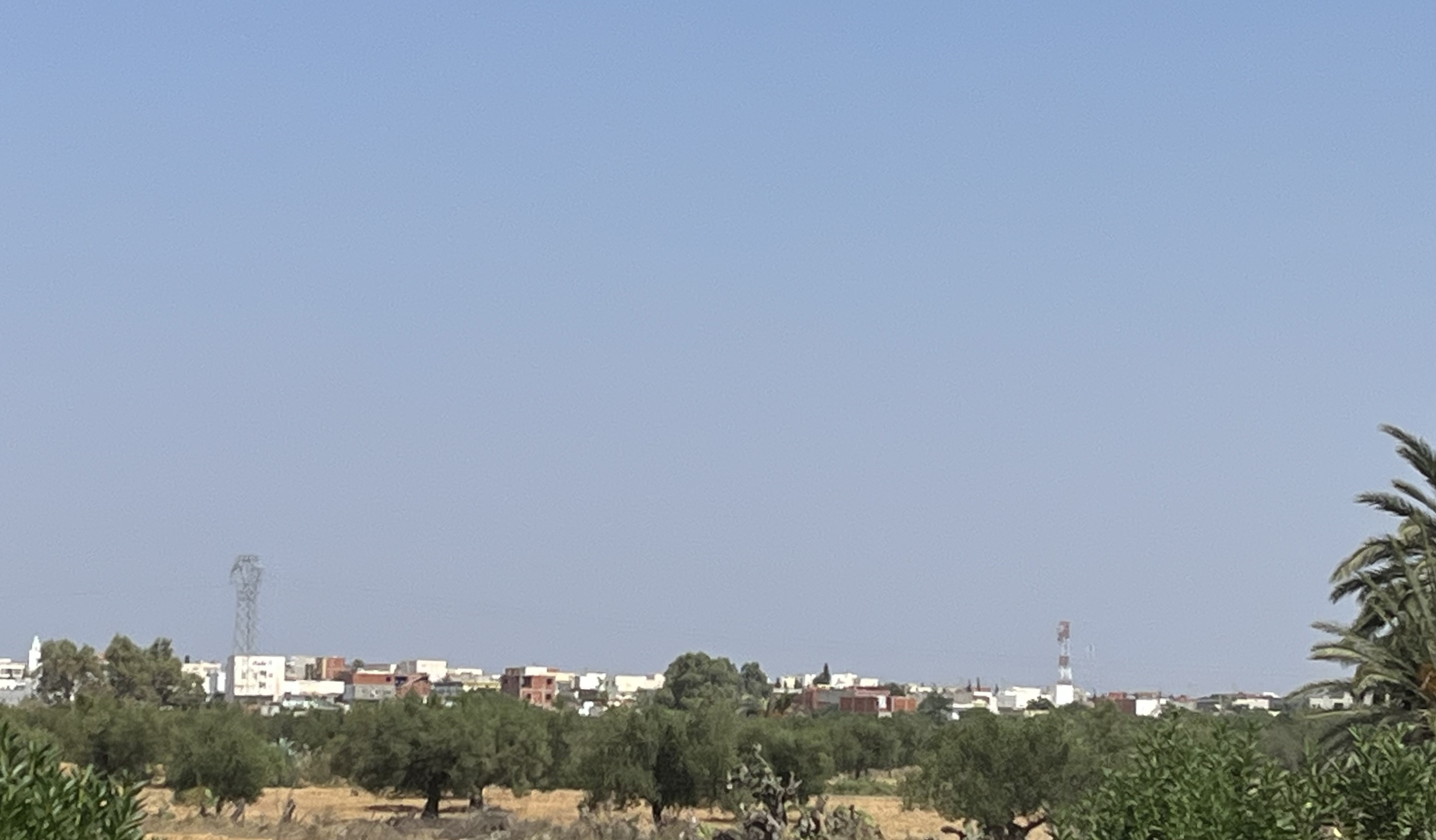
- Interactive map of Kerker
- Country: Tunisia
- Governorate: Mahdia Governorate

Population (2004)
  - Total: 6,143
- Time zone: UTC+1 (CET)

Kerker is a town and commune in the Mahdia Governorate, Tunisia. As of 2004 it had a population of 6,143.

== Notable people ==
- Saber Ben Frej

== See also ==
- El Djem (nearby town)
