= Melloulèche =

Coordinates: 35°10′N 11°02′E

Melloulèche ملولش
- Commune and town
- Interactive map of Melloulèche
- Country: Tunisia
- Governorate: Mahdia Governorate

Population (2014)
  - Total: 6,948
- Time zone: UTC+1 (CET)

Melloulèche is a town and commune in the Mahdia Governorate, Tunisia. In 2004, it had a population of 6,411.

== Population ==
2014 Census (Municipal)
Homes	Families	Males	Females	Total
2030	1536	3338	3581	6919

== See also ==
- List of cities in Tunisia
