= US Monastir =

US Monastir may refer to:

- US Monastir (basketball), basketball section of the multi-sports club
- US Monastir (football), football section of the multi-sports club
