= Hebira =

Coordinates: 35°10′12″N 10°13′48″E

Hebira هبيرة
- Commune and town
- Interactive map of Hebira
- Country: Tunisia
- Governorate: Mahdia Governorate

Population (2014)
  - Total: 3,257
- Time zone: UTC+1 (CET)

Hebira is a town and commune in the Mahdia Governorate, Tunisia. As of 2014 it had a population of 6,179.

== Population ==
2014 Census (Municipal)
Homes	Families	Males	Females	Total
959	762	1547	1701	3248

== See also ==
- List of cities in Tunisia
