= Bou Merdes =

Coordinates: 35°27′N 10°44′E

Bou Merdes بومرداس
- Commune and town
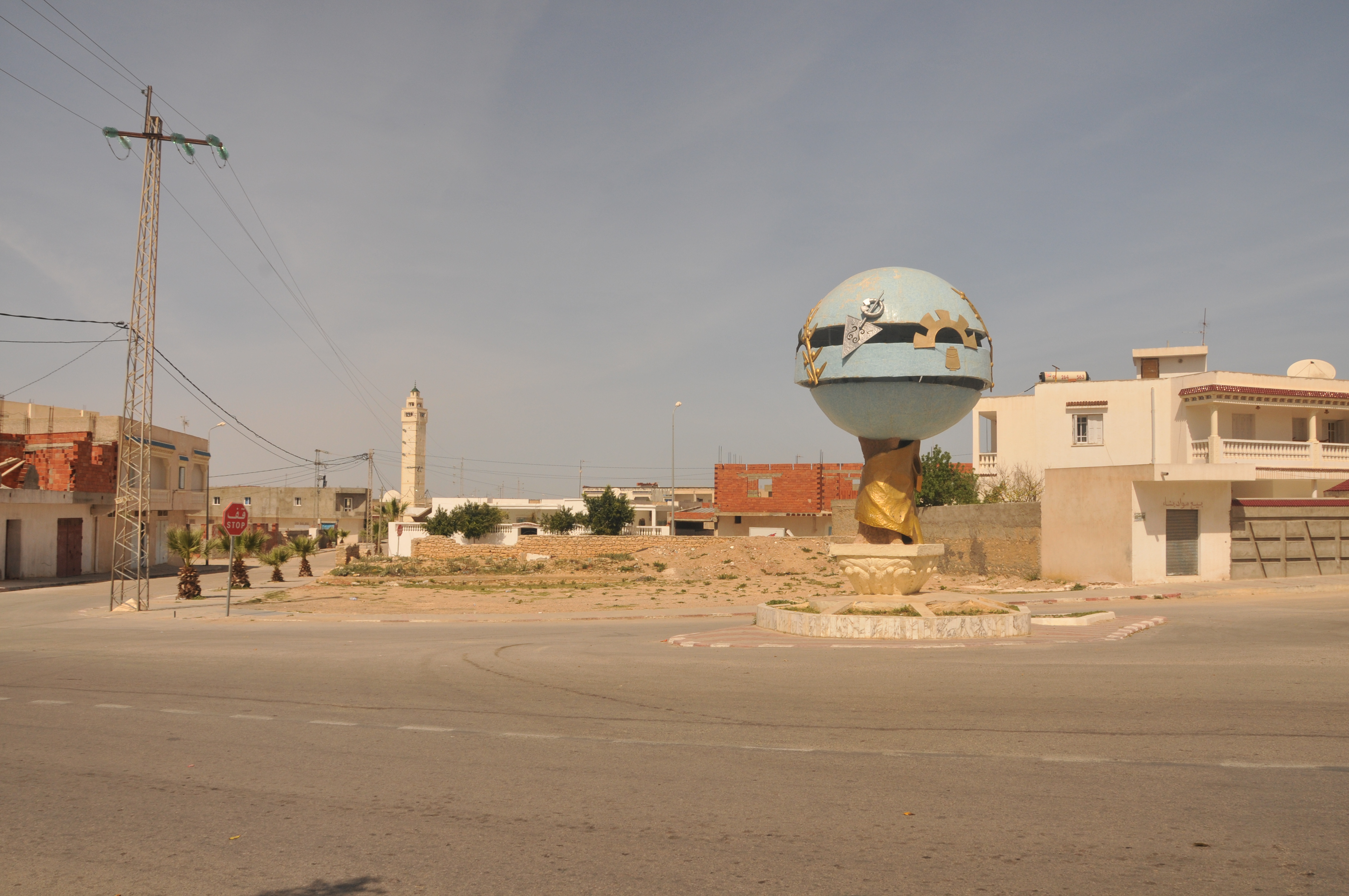
- Interactive map of Bou Merdes
- Country: Tunisia
- Governorate: Mahdia Governorate

Population (2014)
  - Total: 11,829
- Time zone: UTC+1 (CET)

Bou Merdes is a town and commune in the Mahdia Governorate, Tunisia. As of 2004 it had a population of 11,829.

== See also ==
- List of cities in Tunisia
