= Ksour Essef =

Ksour Essef Salaktalatin Sullecthum
- Commune and town
- Location within Tunisia
- Coordinates: 35°26′N 10°59′E
- Country: Tunisia
- Governorate: Mahdia Governorate
- Delegation(s): Ksour Essef

Government
  - Mayor: Abdelhamid Bouzidi (Independent)

Population (2022)
  - Total: 37,683
- Time zone: UTC+1 (CET)
- Postal code: 5180

Ksour Essef or Ksour Essaf (قصور الساف) is a town and commune in the Mahdia Governorate, Tunisia, about 200 km south of Tunis. As of 2014 it had a population of 36,274.

Ksour Essef is noted as the birthplace of the poet Youssef Rzouga.

== Etymology ==
According to oral tradition, the site was occupied by a system of ruined Roman fortifications, which served as a refuge for sparrowhawks (sâf), whence it got the name "Sparrowhawk Castle". This legend contains a note of truth because a text attests that the aristocracy of Mahdia, located twelve kilometres from Ksour Essef, was accustomed to hunt sparrowhawks in the region of Salakta and its environs.

== Geography ==
Ksour Essef is divided into many suburbs, including El Babouss, El Tafalla, Bab El Ksar and Mallaji city. There are several beaches near the village of Salakta.

== History ==
The creation of the city coincided with the arrival of Banu Hilal in 1050. After the destruction of the city of Salakta and the arrival of the Arabs, most of the punic, Greek and Roman inhabitants converted to Islam.

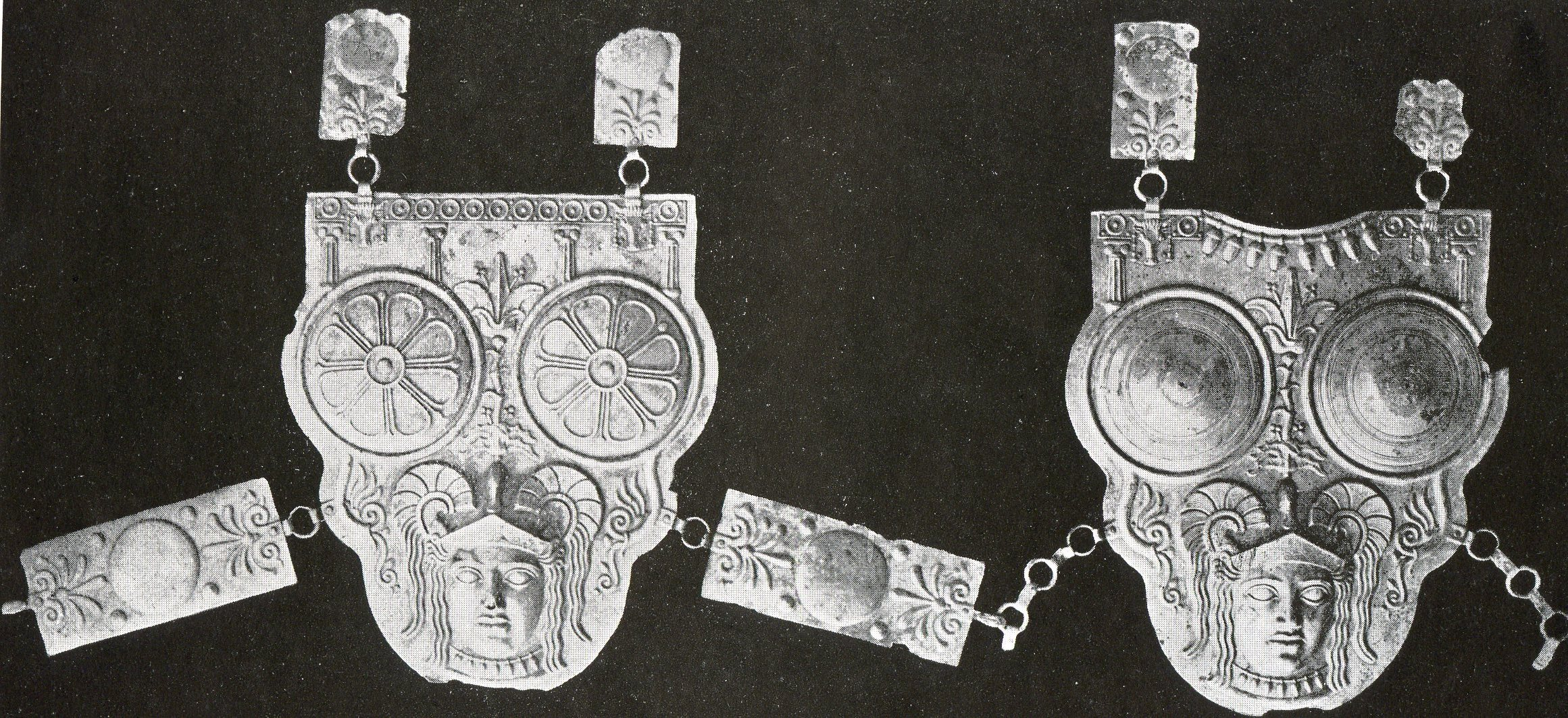
Ksour Essef cuirass on display in the Bardo National Museum

One of the must beautiful pieces in the Bardo National Museum is a bronze cuirass found in a local sepulture, discovered in 1910. It is an import from Italy datable to c.300 BC. The deceased had been buried in a sarcophagus of cypress wood which had traces of the ochre used at the funeral, as did the bones. This coffin is similar to that found at Gigthis with the following dimensions: 84 cm high, 180 cm long and 68 cm wide.

Victor Guérin described the town in 1862: "a sizable town with a population of 5,000 people. It has several mosques, five zawiyas, and three madrasas or schools. Magnificent olive groves surround it."

== Economy ==
Ksour Essef's economy is based on agriculture, fishing, commerce and emigration. In fact, migrants participate directly in its economic development and invest in it, especially in the construction of houses and the establishment of commerce and industry. In addition, a market occurs on Fridays in the central city.

Further, in this region, part of the population also lives from the product of the olive and has lately benefited from the supply of electricity and water in the zensfine, groups of family houses which have cultivated olives together for many generations.

== See also ==
- List of cities in Tunisia
