= Rejiche =

Coordinates: 35°28′N 11°02′E

- Commune and town
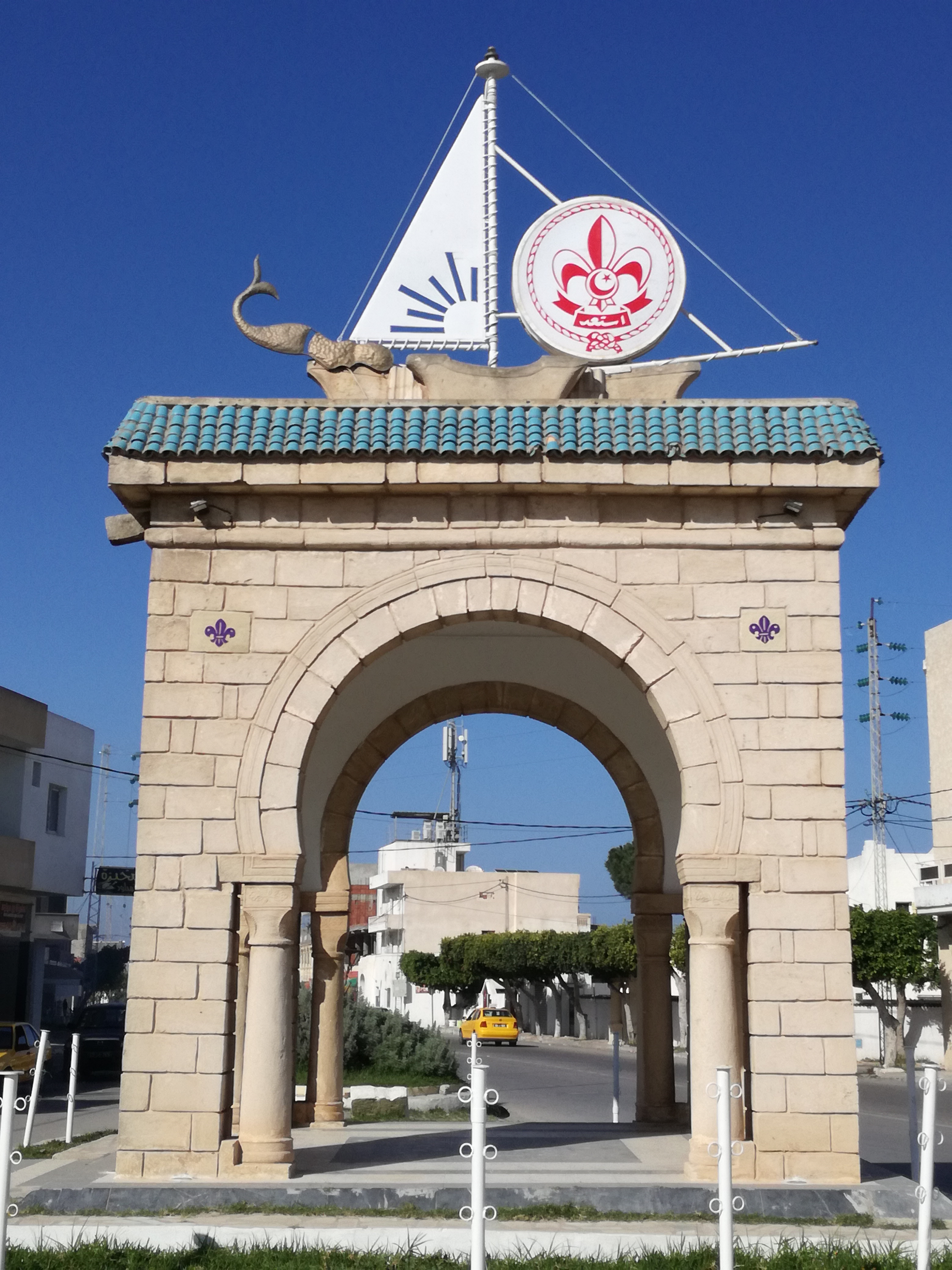
- Emblematic Monument of Rejiche
- Interactive map of Rejiche
- Country: Tunisia
- Governorate: Mahdia Governorate

Population (2022)
  - Total: 11,410
- Time zone: UTC+1 (CET)

Rejiche is a town and commune in the Mahdia Governorate, Tunisia. As of 2004, it had a population of 8,925. It is a southern suburb of Mahdia, lying on the coast.

== See also ==
- List of cities in Tunisia
