= El-Mansoura, Tunisia =

Coordinates: 35°40′N 10°05′E

El-Mansoura is a coastal town outside Kelibia city center. It is located in Nabeul Governorate, Tunisia.
