= El Bradâa =

Coordinates: 35°21′00″N 10°58′48″E

- Commune and town
- Interactive map of El Bradâa
- Country: Tunisia
- Governorate: Mahdia Governorate
- Time zone: UTC+1 (CET)

El Bradâa is a town and commune in the Mahdia Governorate, Tunisia. As of 2004 it had a population of 6,416.

== See also ==
- List of cities in Tunisia
