= Chorbane =

Coordinates: 35°17′N 10°23′E

Chorbane شربان
- Commune and town
- Interactive map of Chorbane
- Country: Tunisia
- Governorate: Mahdia Governorate

Population (2014)
  - Total: 5,710
- Time zone: UTC+1 (CET)

Chorbane is a town and commune in the Mahdia Governorate, Tunisia. As of 2004 it had a population of 5,849.

== Population ==
2014 Census (Municipal)
Homes	Families	Males	Females	Total
1560	1344	2665	3035	5700

== See also ==
- List of cities in Tunisia
