= Sidi Alouane =

Coordinates: 35°23′N 10°56′E

Sidi Alouane Arabic: سيدي علوان
- Commune and town
- Interactive map of Sidi Alouane
- Country: Tunisia
- Governorate: Mahdia Governorate

Population (2014)
  - Total: 7,610
- Time zone: UTC+1 (CET)

Sidi Alouane (Arabic: سيدي علوان) is a town and commune in the Mahdia Governorate, Tunisia. As of 2004 it had a population of 6,651.

== See also ==
- List of cities in Tunisia
