= Mahdia Governorate =

Governorate of Tunisia

Mahdia ولاية المهدية
- Governorate
- Flag Coat of arms

- Map of Tunisia with Mahdia highlighted

- Subdivisions of Mahdia Governorate
- Coordinates: 35°30′N 11°04′E
- Country: Tunisia
- Created: 5 June 1974
- Capital: Mahdia

Government
  - Governor: Anis Laadhari (since 2024)

Area
  - Total: 2,966 km^{2} (1,145 sq mi)
  - Rank: Ranked 16th of 24

Population (2014)
  - Total: 410,812
  - Rank: Ranked 14th of 24
  - Density: 138.5/km^{2} (358.7/sq mi)
- Time zone: UTC+01 (CET)
- Postal prefix: xx
- ISO 3166 code: TN-53

Mahdia Governorate (Tunisian Arabic: ولاية المهدية; French: Gouvernorat de Mahdia) is in central-eastern Tunisia, named after its largest town and administrative centre. It comprises an area of coastal relative lowland, but extends further inland than its coastal length. It is one of the twenty-four governorates (provinces). It covers an area of 2,966 km², and has a population of 410,812 (as at the 2014 census). Four other governorates are its neighbours - clockwise from south, Sfax, Kairouan, Sousse and Monastir Governorates. The governorate of Mahdia was created by the decree of March 9, 1974 after having been part of the governorate of Sousse.

== Economic summary ==
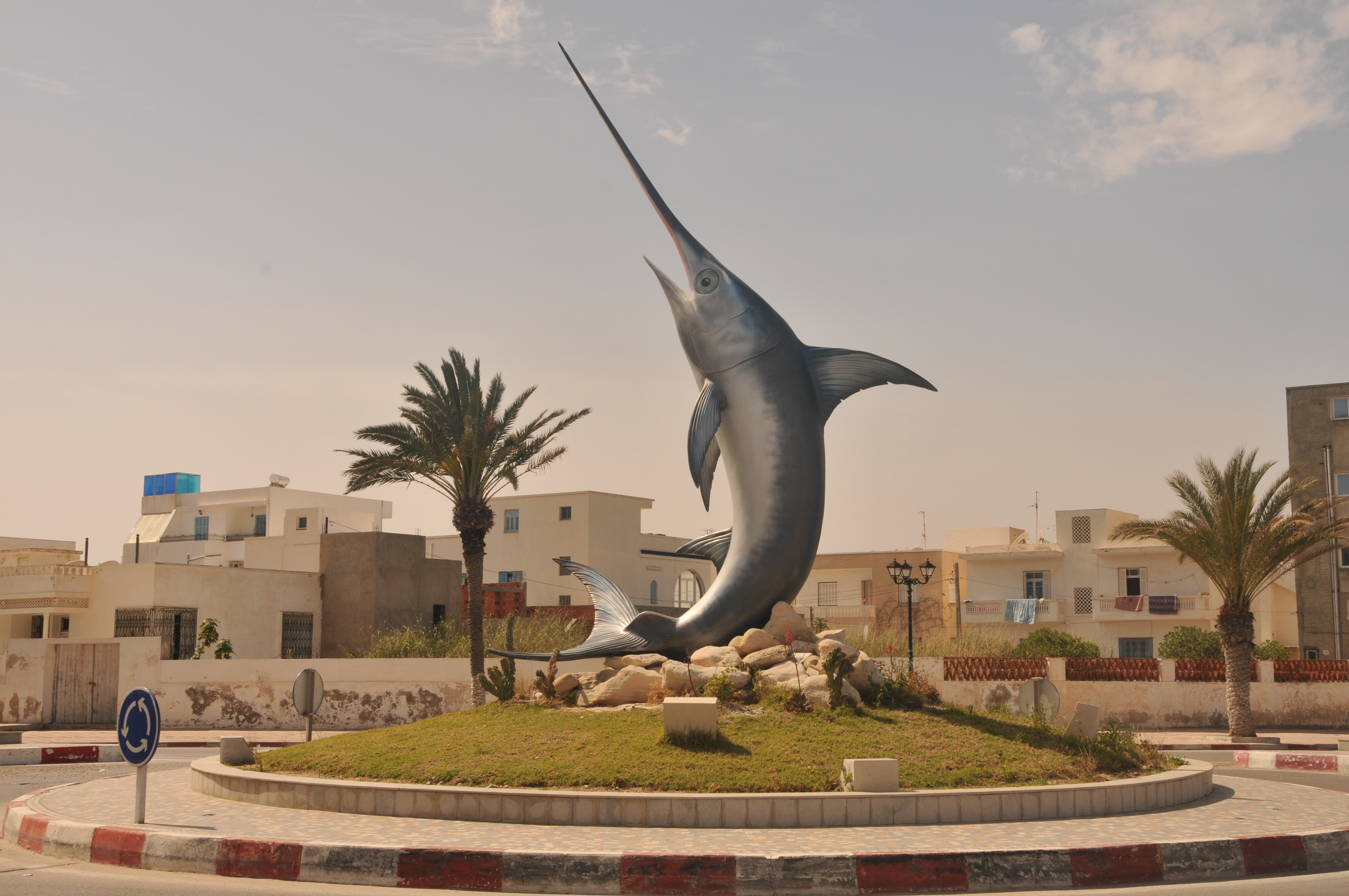
Swordfish on a roundabout in Mahdia. The tourist industry is reflected in the area by luxury accommodation, restaurants and impressive works of art.

Mahdia, the administrative centre, is a coastal resort with prominent weaving and fish processing industries.

The other coastal urban centre is the small town of Chebba, on the headland of a bay. Ksour Essef is midway between these towns and approximately 2.5 km inland. El Djem is 13 km inland and a mid-sized town on a major crossroads of roads in the district and having Tunisia's main north-south railway. The nearest international airport is connected by road and rail and is 15 km north of Mahdia (the town), Monastir Habib Bourguiba International Airport.

=== Synopsis of history ===
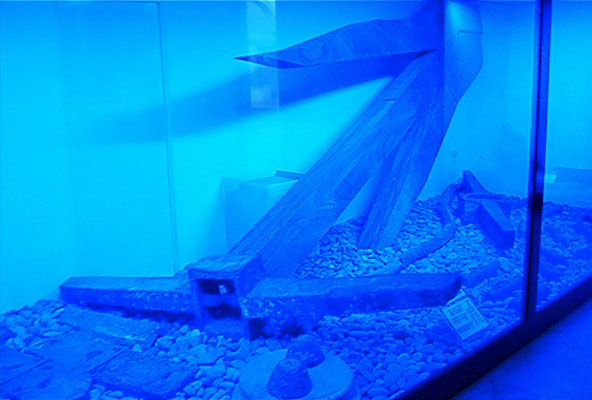
Ship's anchor of the Mahdia shipwreck, many of the artefacts of which are in the Bardo National Museum in Tunis.

The two main coastal cities are of historic note to Greek, Roman, and early Muslim societies. They include the Mahdia shipwreck – a sunken ship found off Mahdia's shore, containing Greek art treasures – dated to about 80 BC, the early part of Roman rule in this region. The old part of Mahdia corresponds to the Roman city called Aphrodisium and, later, called Africa (a name perhaps derived from the older name), or Cape Africa.

== Climate ==
The climate is semiarid throughout particularly in the summer and due to the high albedo effects compared to provinces of the far north, nighttime temperatures tend to fall more, to a similar temperature to average upland parts of the north. Much of the developed area benefits from the Sousse area's advanced water distribution network from dammed rivers and lakes including those hundreds of miles to the west which provides water for domestic use and pools.

== Administrative divisions ==
The governorate is divided into eleven delegations (mutamadiyat), listed below with their populations at the 2004 and 2014 Censuses:

Delegation	Area in km^{2}	Pop'n 2004 Census	Pop'n 2014 Census
Bou Merdès	191	29,559	33,890
Chebba	119	23,334	24,515
Chorbane	444	28,577	25,935
El Djem	287	41,064	48,611
Essouassi	348	46,276	50,424
Hebira	316	11,057	10,654
Ksour Essef	221	48,799	54,366
Mahdia	166	71,719	79,545
Melloulèche	161	19,464	22,085
Ouled Chamekh	325	22,732	23,020
Sidi Alouane	289	35,272	37,767

Eighteen municipalities are in Mahdia Governorate: Bou Merdes, Bradaa, Chebba, Chorbane, Eljem, Essouassi, Hebira, Hkaima, Kerker, Ksour Essef, Mahdia, Melloulèche, Ouled Chamekh, Rejiche, Sidi Alouane, Sidi Zid, Tlelsa and Zelba.

3311	Mahdia	60,352
3312	Rejiche	11,603
3313	Bou Merdes	17,089
3314	Ouled Chamekh	23,893
3315	Chorbane	29,059
3316	Hebira	11,617
3317	Essouassi	34,619
3318	El Djem	38,413
3319	Kerker	19,559
3320	Chebba	31,137
3321	Melloulèche	23,890
3322	Sidi Alouane	27,654
3323	Ksour Essef	38,567
3324	El Bradâa	13,659
	El Hekaima	14,152
	Sidi Zid - Awled Moulahem	24,064
	Tlelsa	17,563
	Zelba	12,654

Electorally and for some more national purposes, Mahdia has eleven delegations, most boundaries of which are similar to the governorates.

== See also ==
- Mansoura, Tunisia
