= El Djem =

El Djem الجم Thysdrus
- El Djem
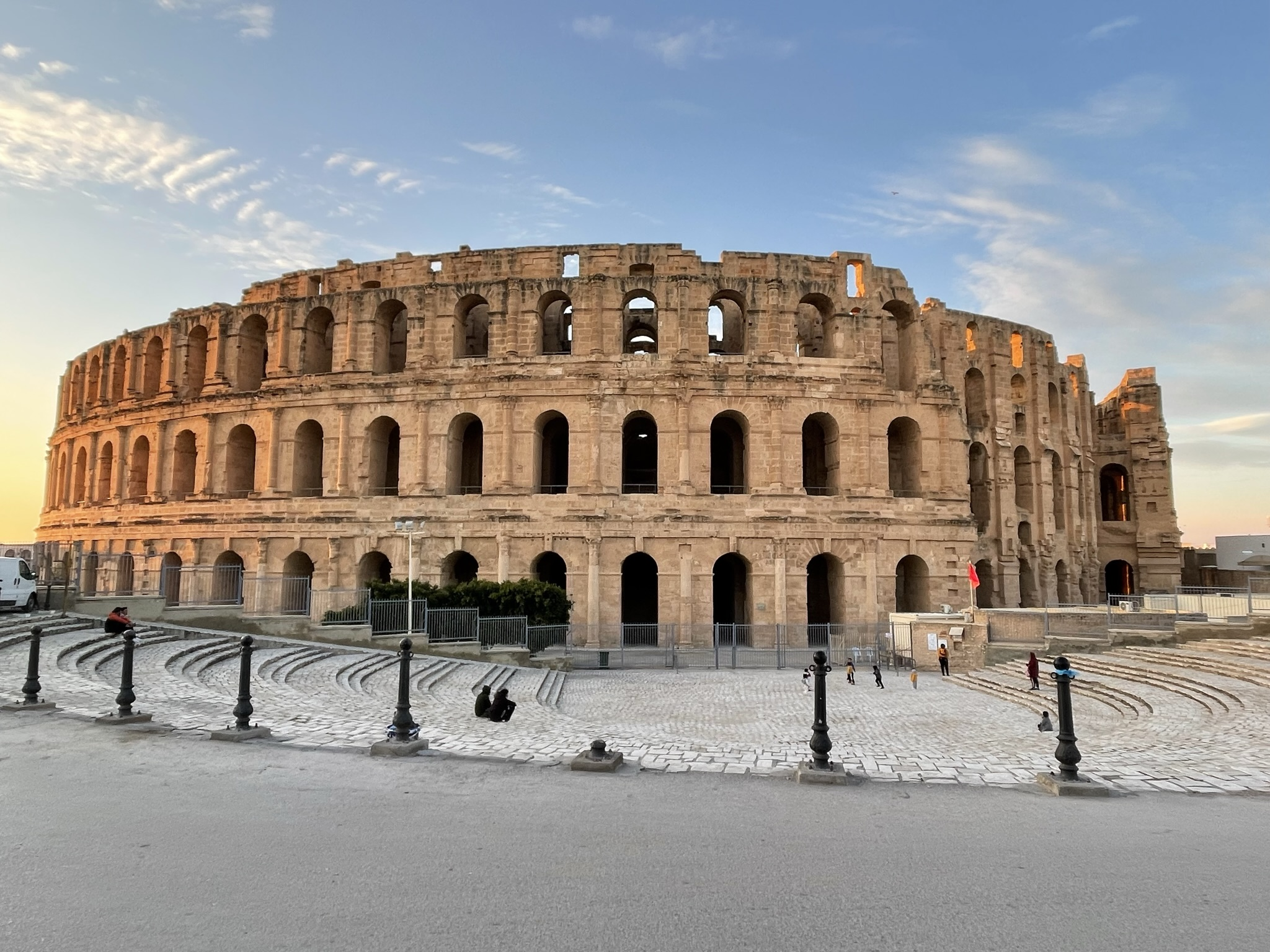
- Amphitheatre of El Jem

- Location in Tunisia
- Coordinates: 35°17′48″N 10°42′46″E
- Country: Tunisia
- Governorate: Sfax Governorate

Population (2014)
  - Total: 21,544
- Time zone: UTC1 (CET)

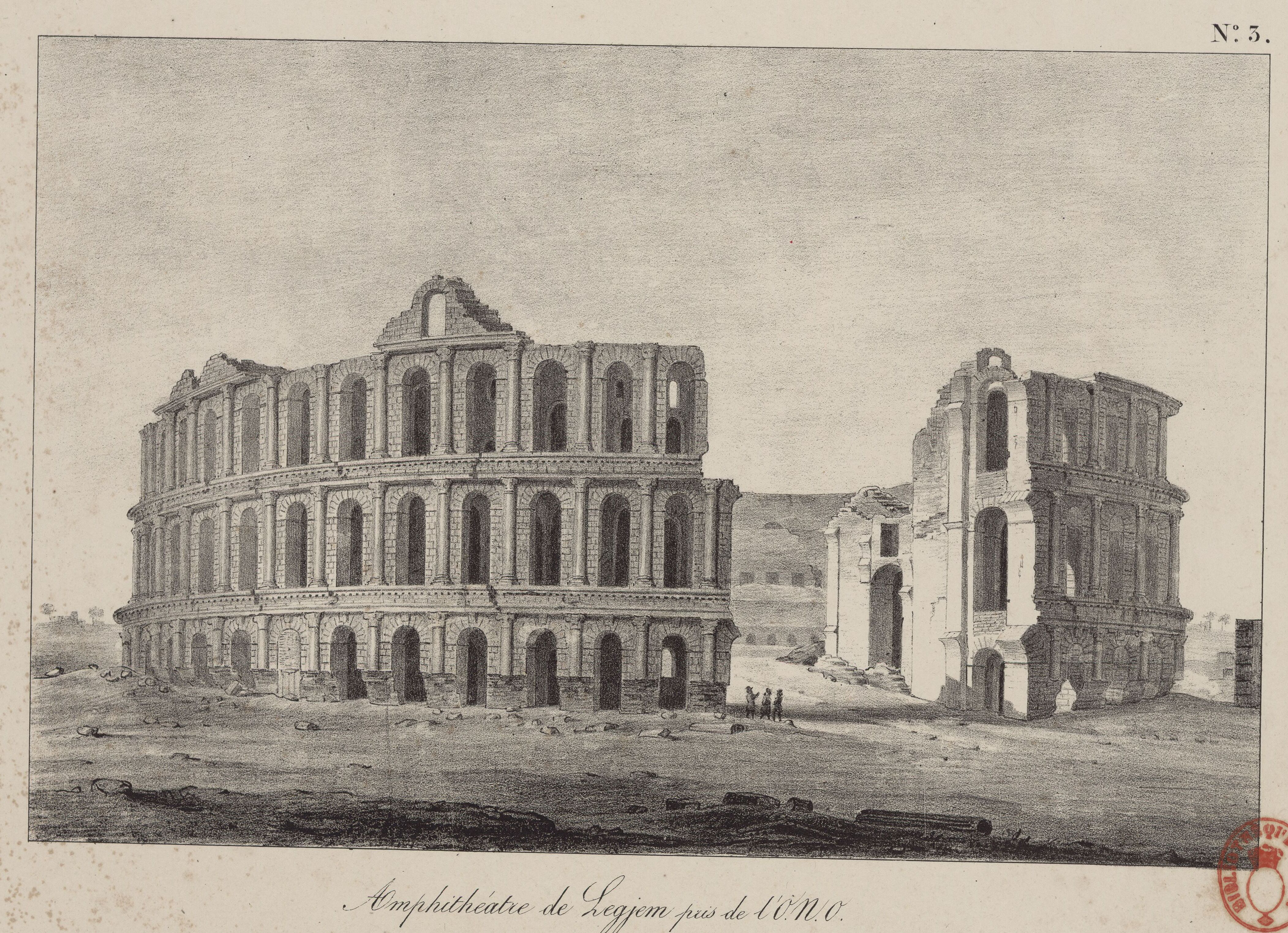
The amphitheatre in 1833

El Djem or El Jem (Tunisian Arabic: الجمّ, il-Jamm) is a town in Mahdia Governorate, Tunisia. Its population was 21,544 at the 2014 census. It is home to Roman remains, including the Amphitheatre of El Jem.

== History ==
The Roman city of Thysdrus was built, like almost all Roman settlements in ancient Tunisia, on former Punic settlements. In a less arid climate than today's, Thysdrus prospered as an important center of olive oil production and export. It was the seat of a Christian bishopric, which is included in the Catholic Church's list of titular sees.

By the early 3rd century, when the amphitheatre was built, Thysdrus rivaled Hadrumetum (modern Sousse) as the second city of Roman North Africa after Carthage. However, following the abortive revolt that began there in AD 238 and Gordian's suicide in his villa near Carthage, Roman troops loyal to the emperor Maximinus Thrax sacked the city. The town is shown on the 4th-century Peutinger Map.

The prosperity of Thysdrus in Roman times, despite the challenges posed by its hostile geographical environment reveals a diversity of economic and craft activities far richer than initially thought. These recent archaeological discoveries open up new perspectives on the workings of this ancient city and challenge the traditional image of a simple commercial centre.

Recent agricultural research has provided some interesting insights into the rural dynamics surrounding Thysdrus. Although the difficult soil and lack of water posed major challenges to agriculture, the remains of rural settlements and small towns reveal more sustained activity than expected. However, the question of the extent of olive growing in the region remains open to debate, due to the absence of ancient oil mills and persistent questions about agricultural practices at the time.

In addition, analysis of the surrounding landscape highlights a degree of ecological degradation, attributable in particular to intensive land use over the centuries. These findings call for in-depth interdisciplinary studies to better understand the interactions between human activities and the environment in ancient times.

Archaeological digs at Thysdrus reveal an economic and craft vitality. The remains of metallurgical, bone-working, moulding and sculpture workshops bear witness to the ingenuity and creativity of the region's artisans. What's more, although pottery workshops have yet to be identified, ceramic production seems to have played a crucial role in the local economy, as evidenced by the many finds of statuettes and terracotta moulds.

== Sights ==
=== Amphitheatre ===
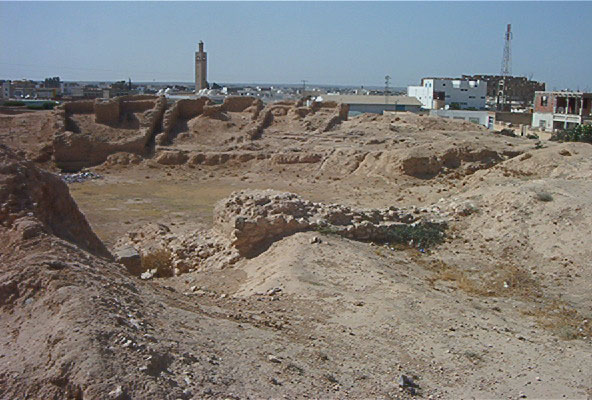
View of the first two amphitheatres

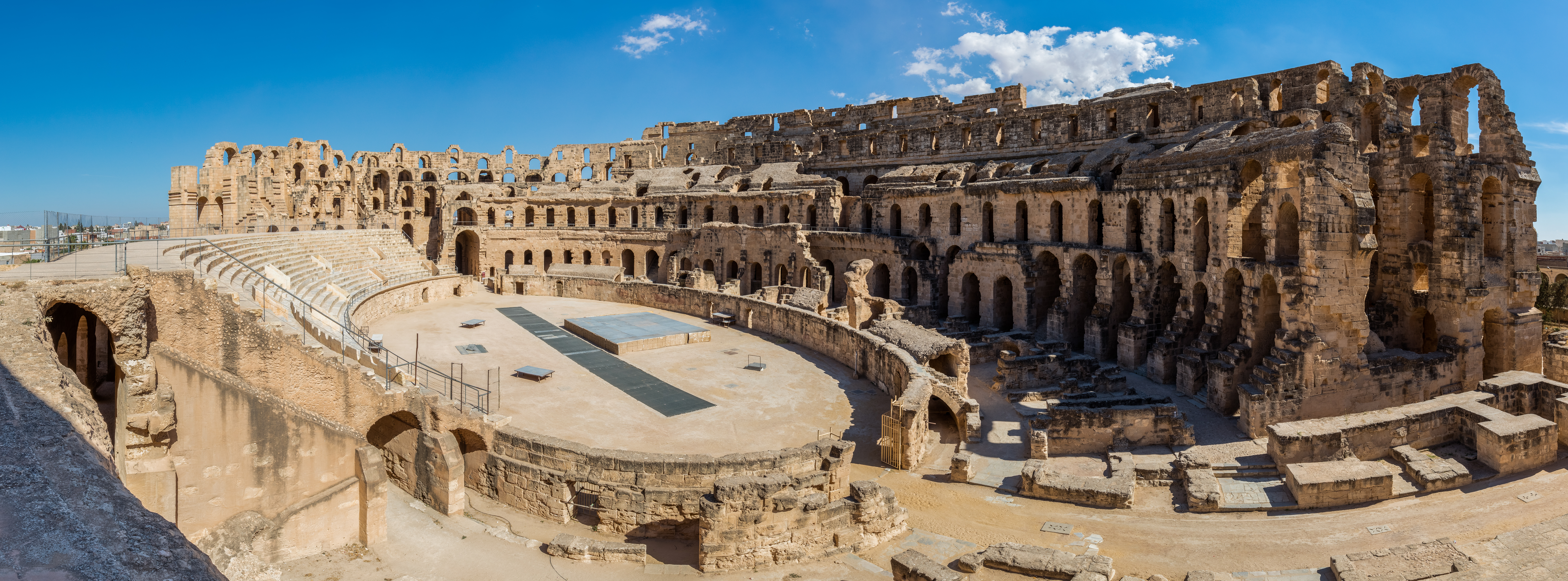
The Amphitheatre of El Jem

The Amphitheatre of El Jem could seat 35,000 spectators. Only the Colosseum in Rome (seating about 50,000 spectators) and the ruined theatre of Capua were larger.

The Romans built the amphitheatre at El Djem under proconsul Gordian, who was acclaimed emperor at Thysdrus around 238 and was mainly used for gladiator shows and small-scale chariot races.

Until the 17th century, it remained more or less whole. From then on, its stones were used for building the nearby village of El Djem and transported to the Great Mosque in Kairouan. At a tense moment during struggles with the Ottomans who used cannons to flush rebels out of the amphitheatre.

The ruins of the amphitheatre were declared a World Heritage Site in 1979. It hosts the annual El Djem International Symphony Festival.

=== Others ===
Drifting sand is preserving the market city of Thysdrus and the refined suburban villas that once surrounded it. Some floor mosaics have been found and published, one of them featuring the iconography of (Dea) Africa, but field archaeology has scarcely been attempted. Recently, with aerial photos, a huge racetrack stadium has been discovered.

The dry climate of Thysdrus has helped to preserve writings on papyrus.

== Transport ==
El Djem is located on the A1 motorway which runs from Tunis to Sfax.

The metre gauge railway from Tunis to Gabès, known as La Ligne de la Côte, stops at El Djem.

== Gallery ==
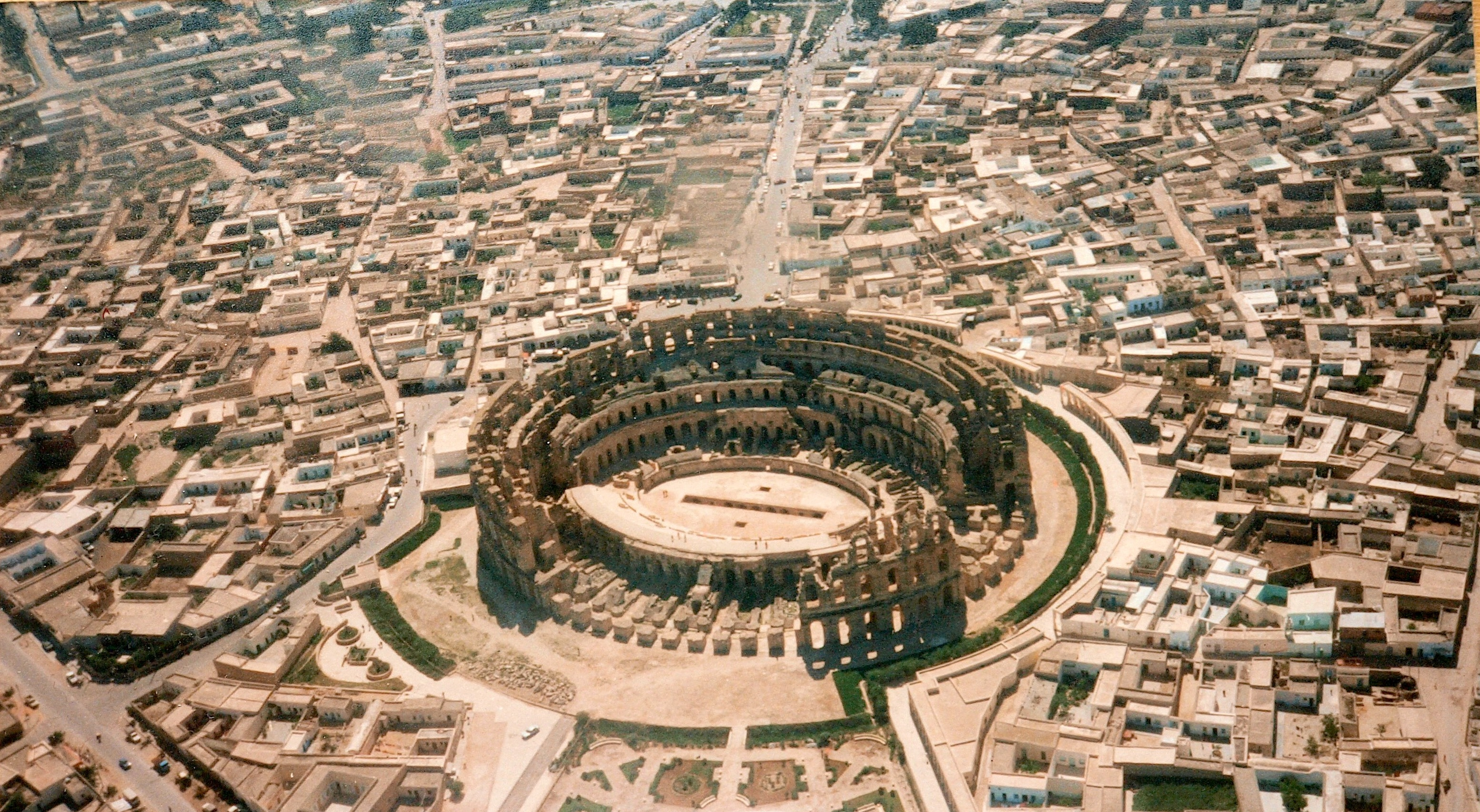
Aerial view of El Djem and Amphitheatre

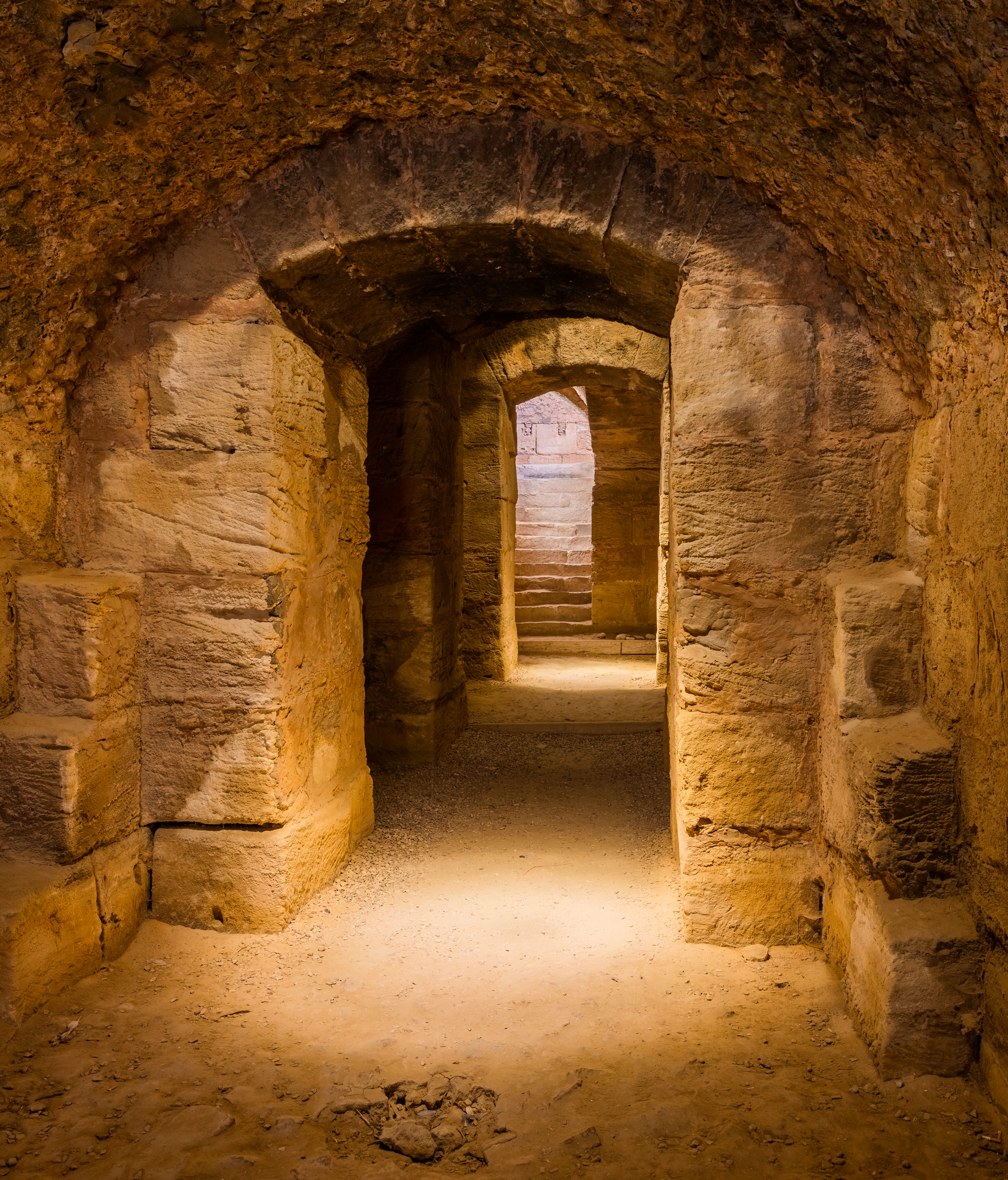
Underground alley

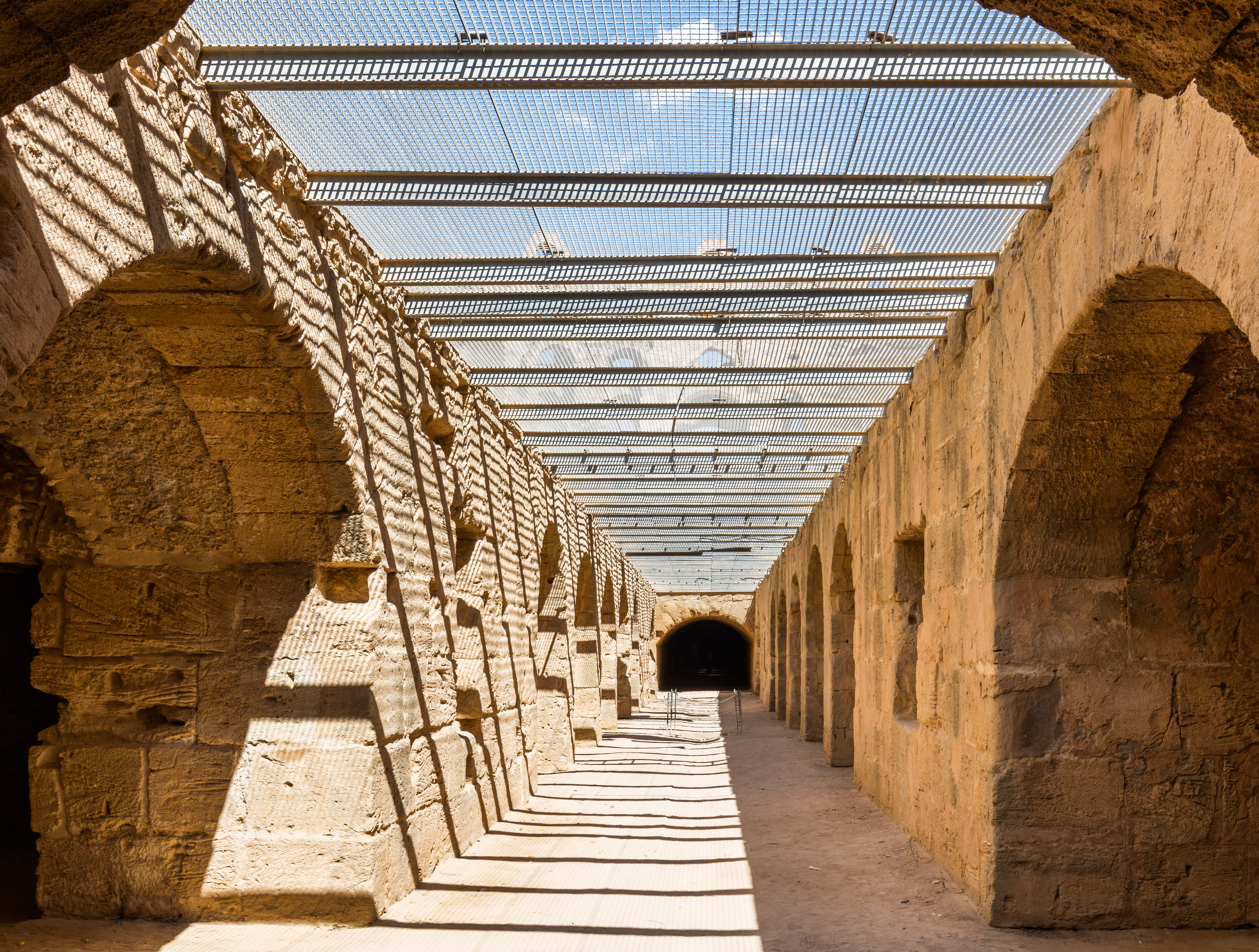
An alley under the arena

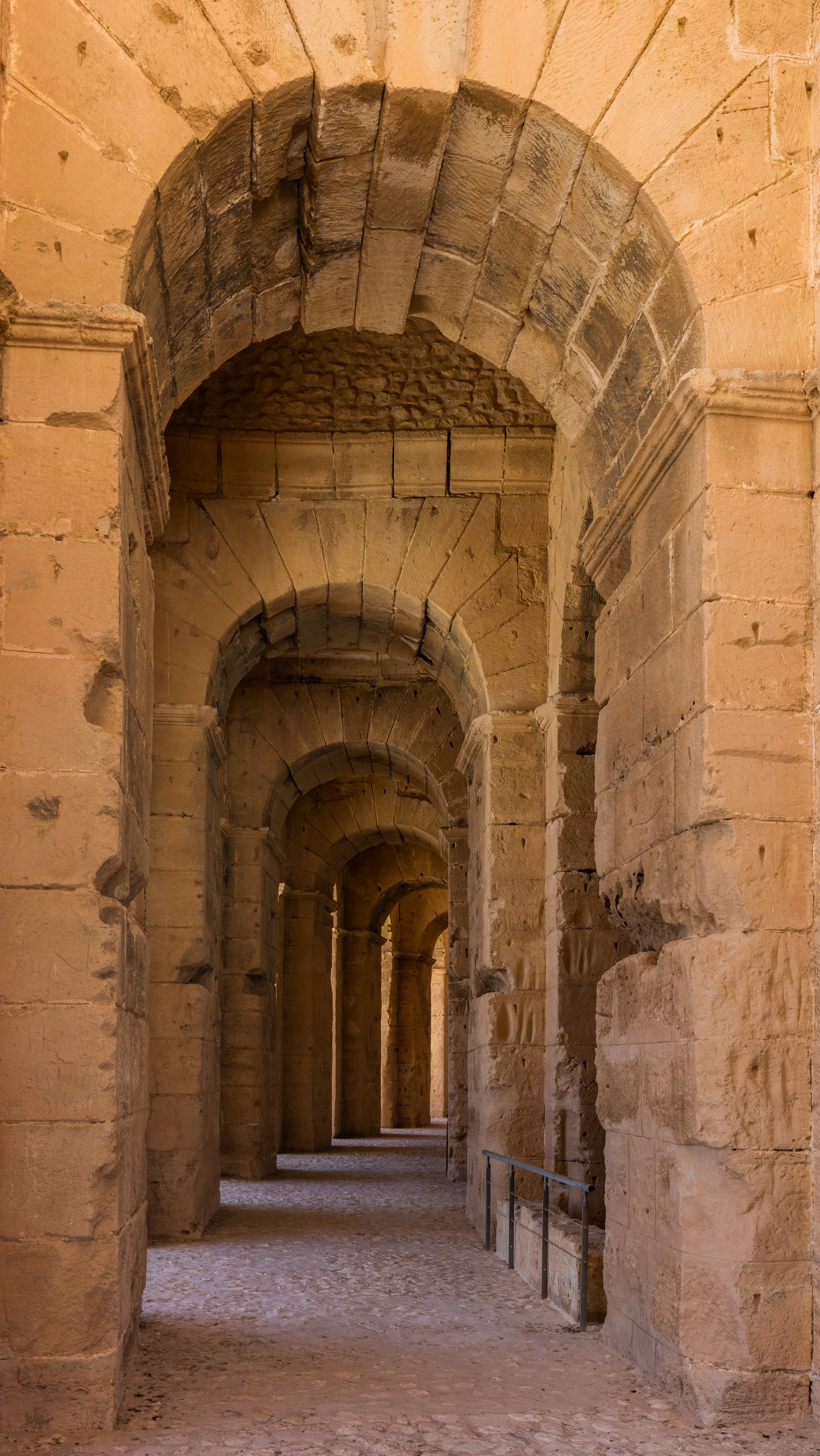
Porticos

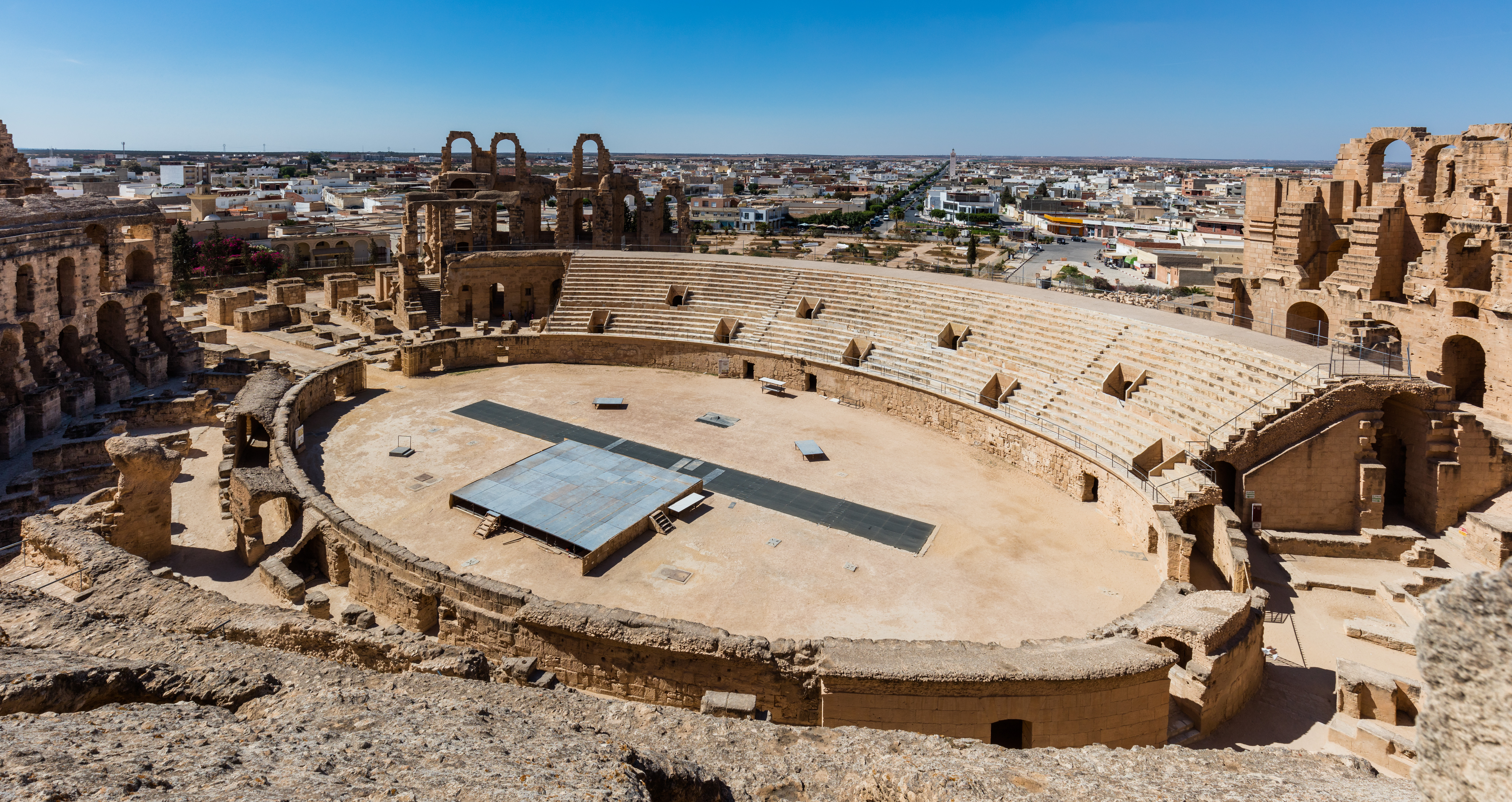
View of the arena

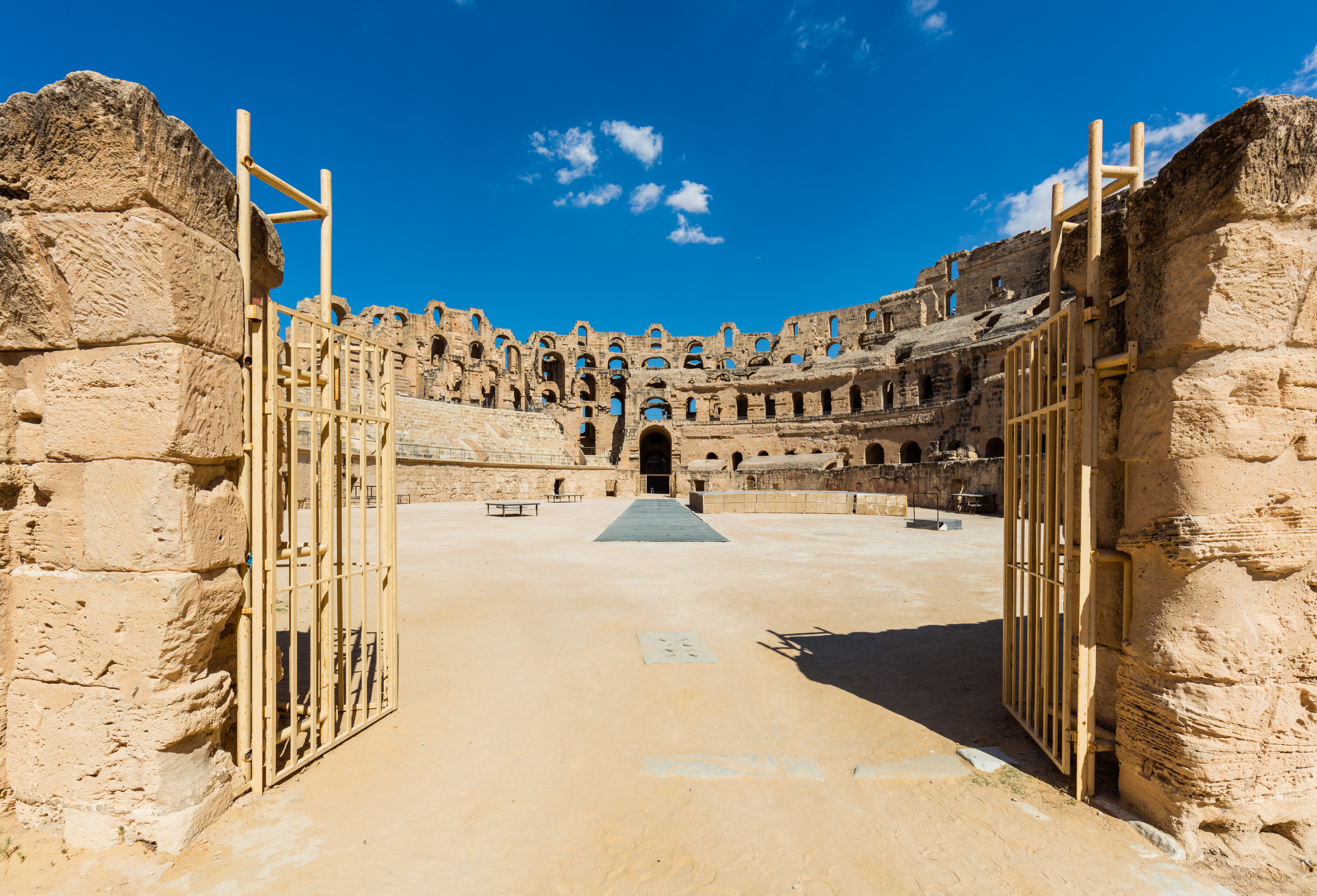
Entrance of the Arena

== See also ==
- Hadrumetum
- Thapsus
- Dougga
- Roman 'Coloniae' in Berber Africa
