= Kroussia (Tunisia) =

Sector in the governorate of Sousse, Tunisia

Kroussia (كروسية) Krussiah/Kroussiah
- Sidi El Hani, Sousse, Tunisie
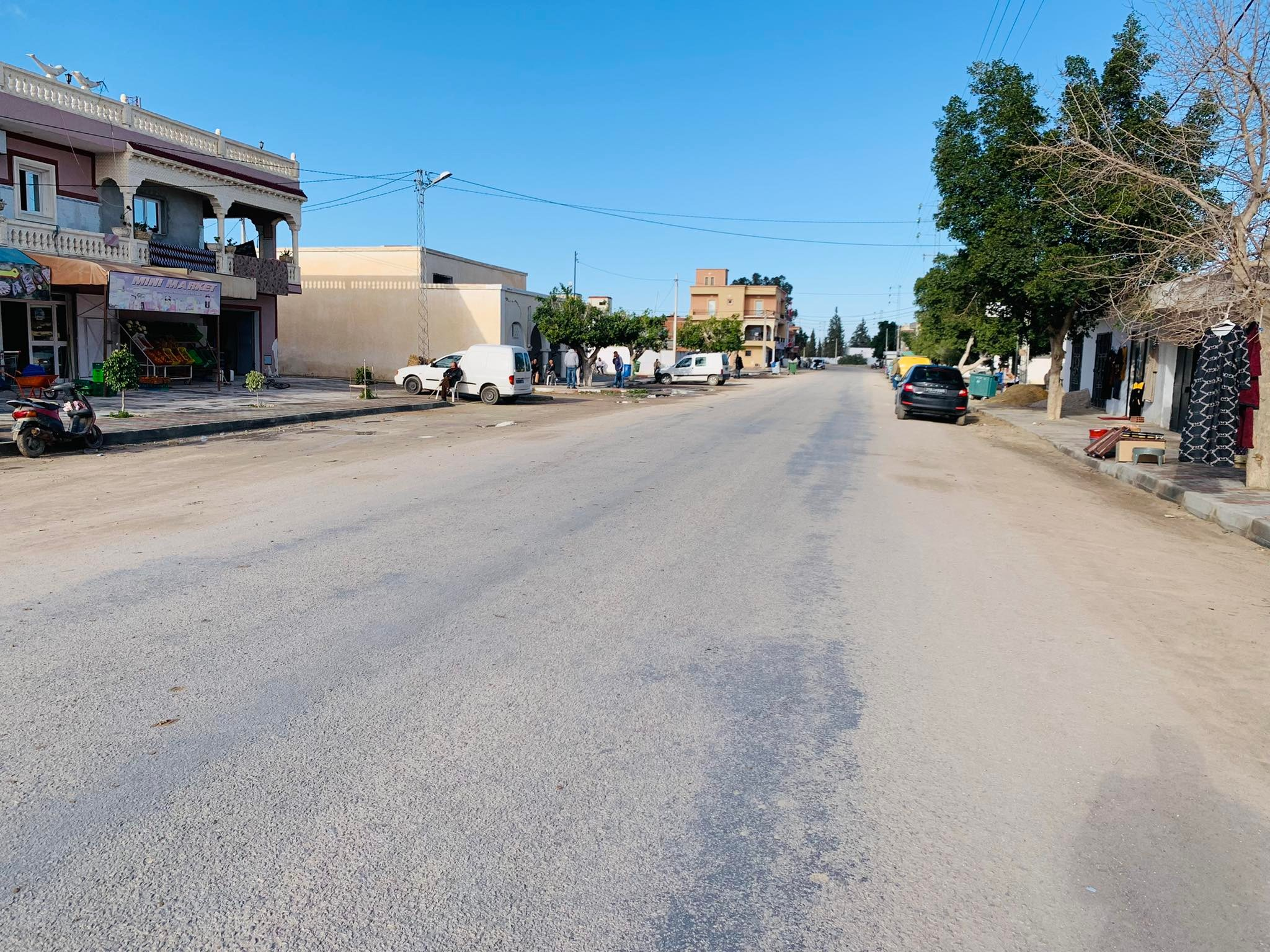
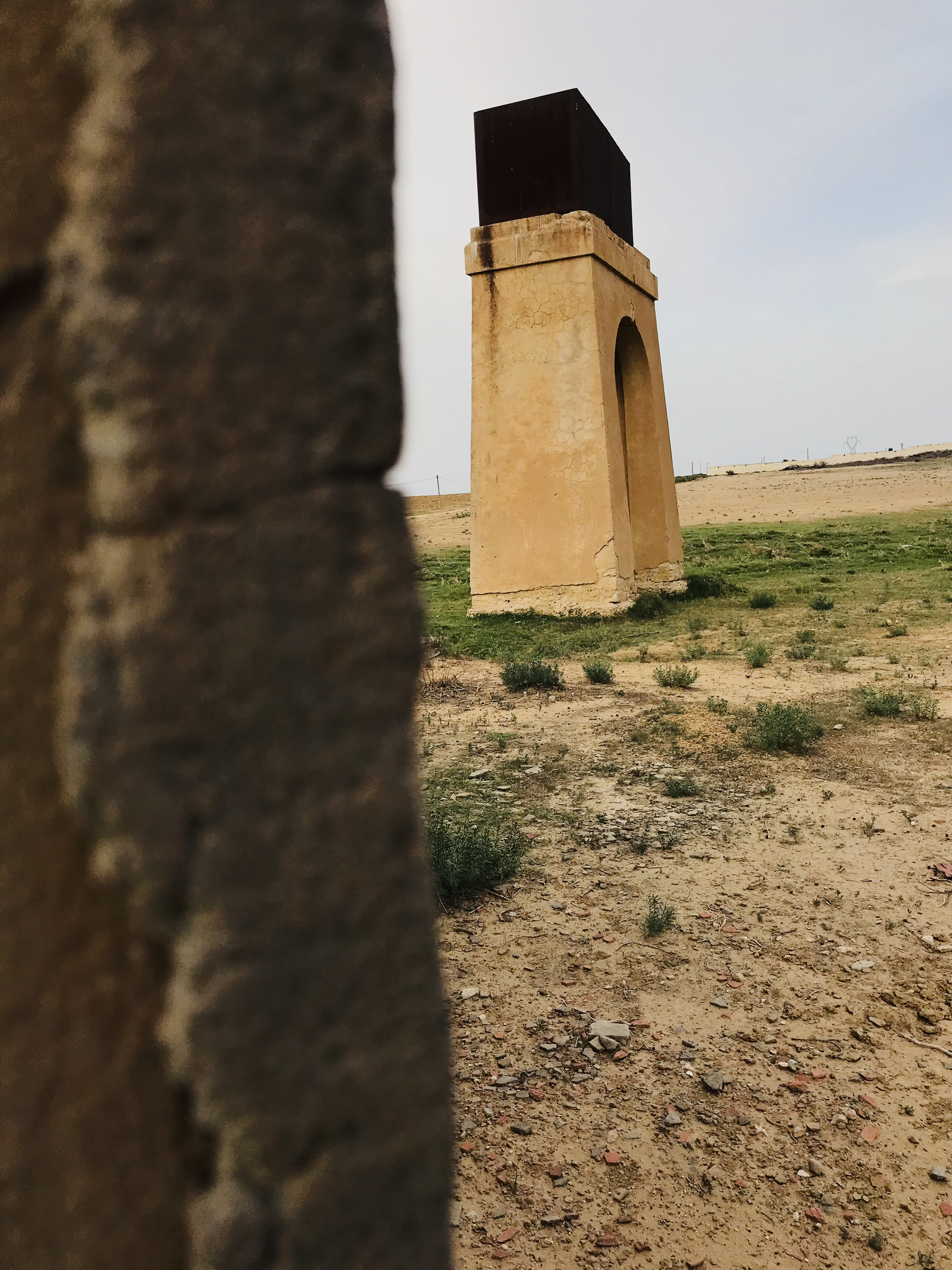
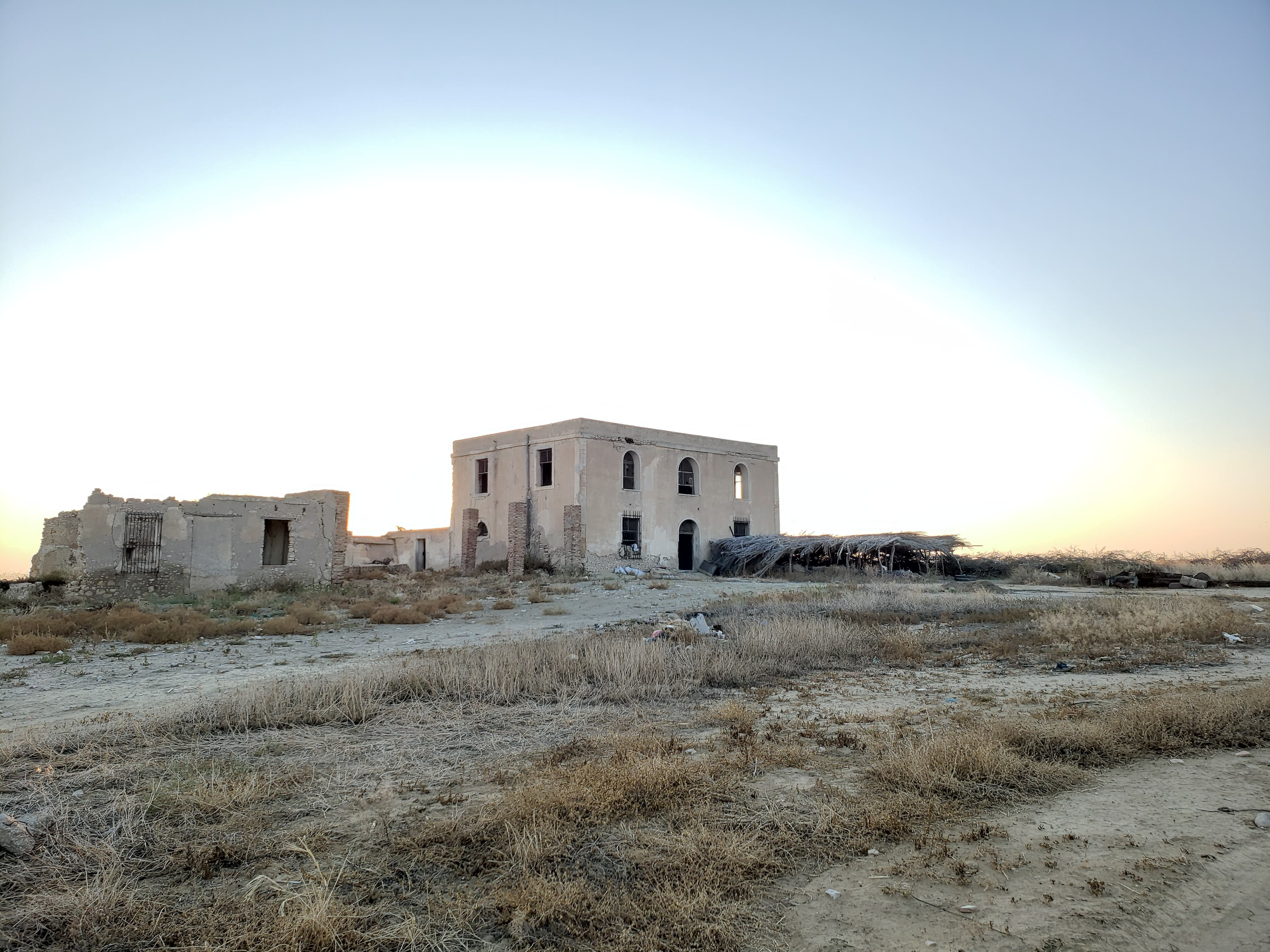
- From top to bottom, left to right: The center of the Village, the Miestone of Kroussia, Water station dating back to the late 19th century, and Dar El-Magroun (built in the 1860s).

- Flag

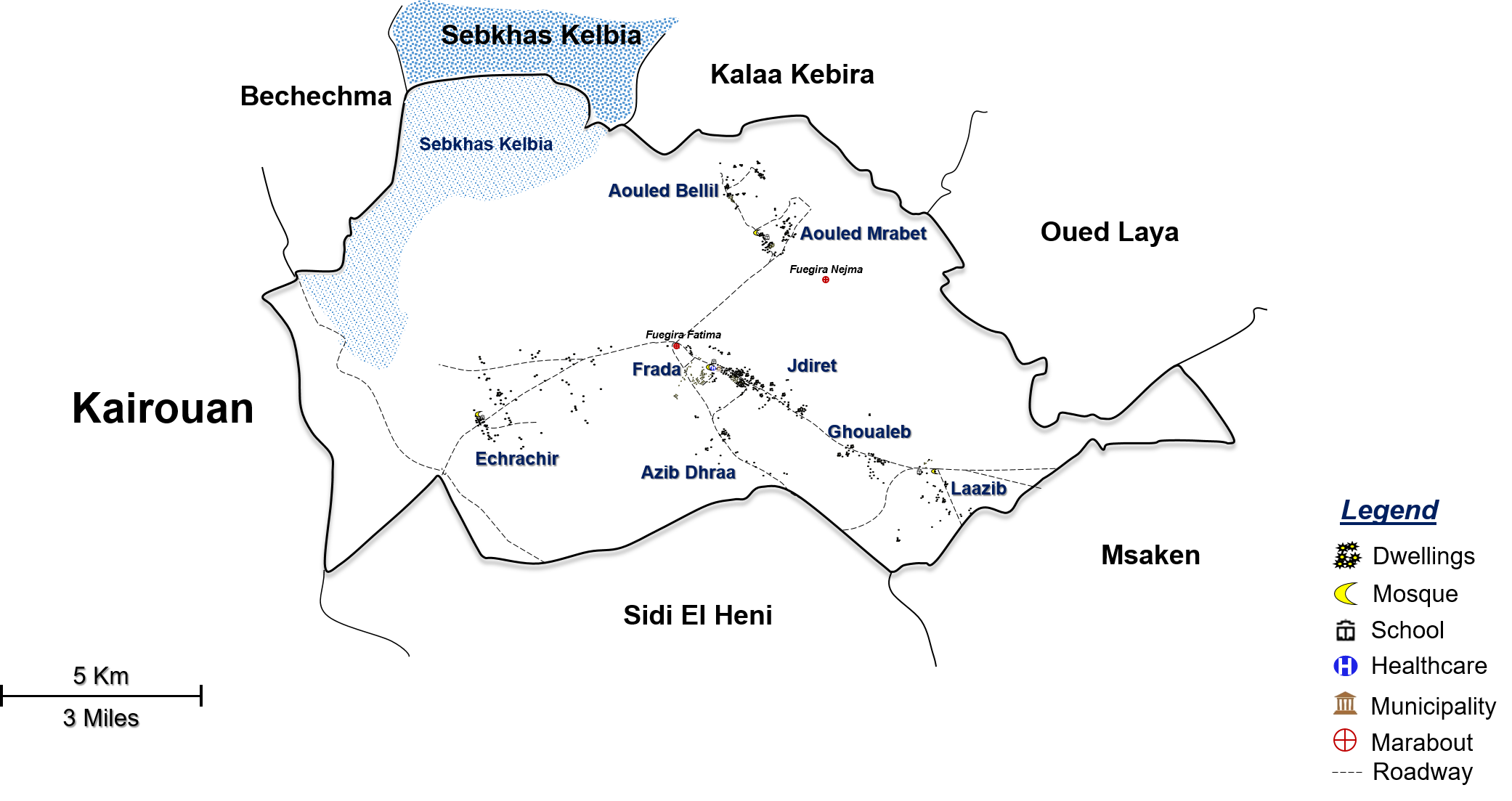
- Map of Kroussia
- Coordinates: 35°46′N 10°19′E
- Country: Tunisia
- Governorate: Sousse Governorate
- Delegation: Sidi El Hani

Population (2014)
  - Total: 4,562
- Time zone: UTC+01:00
- Postal code: 4026

Kroussia (Krussiah in historical documents; Arabic: كروسيا or كروسية) is a sector located in the mid-east of Tunisia, within to the delegation of Sidi El Hani and the governorate of Sousse. This sector covers an area of 148.7 km^{2} and has a population of 4,562 based on the census of 2014. Kroussia is divided into two subsectors: (1) Central Kroussia (Area: 50.2 km^{2}; Population: 2,620) and (2) Western Kroussia (Area: 98.2 km^{2}; Population: 1,942). Each subsector of Kroussia is led by a sheikh. Based on a manuscript dating back to 1651, Kroussia was part of Zaouiet (Corner) of Sidi Ali Louhichi (Arabic:سيدي علي الوحيشي) in Kairouan. Early in the 19th century, several families from Msaken took over the domain of Kroussia by force before it became an independent Cheikhat (مشيخة) of Caidat (قاعدة) Sousse towards the end of the 19th century.

According to Lambert, the region of Kroussia was divided into two main domains:

1. Krussiah: 30 km from Caidat Sousse (now known as Sousse Governorate)
2. Sahali: A small indigenous center located at 33 km from Caidat Sousse.

The following table presents the different fractions and subfractions of Kroussia during the late 19th century and the early 20th century:

Kroussia in the Late 19th - Early 20th Century (Civil Control of Sousse)
Caidat	Cheikhat	Cheick	Fraction	Subfraction	Residence
Sousse	Kroussiah	Ammar Ben El Hadj Hassan Ben Abdallah (Started on June 26, 1898)	El Azib El Ouhichi	-	Kroussia
Sousse	Kroussiah	Ammar Ben El Hadj Hassan Ben Abdallah (Started on June 26, 1898)	Oulad Said	El Azib	Kroussia
Sousse	Kroussiah	Ammar Ben El Hadj Hassan Ben Abdallah (Started on June 26, 1898)	Oulad Said	Oulad Oun	Kroussia
Sousse	Kroussiah	Ammar Ben El Hadj Hassan Ben Abdallah (Started on June 26, 1898)	Oulad Said	Essafat	Oued El Atef
Sousse	Kroussiah	Ammar Ben El Hadj Hassan Ben Abdallah (Started on June 26, 1898)	Oulad Said	Oulad Abd Er Rahman	Es Sed
Sousse	Kroussiah	Ammar Ben El Hadj Hassan Ben Abdallah (Started on June 26, 1898)	Oulad Said	Oulad Bou Saada	Es Sed
Sousse	Kroussiah	Ammar Ben El Hadj Hassan Ben Abdallah (Started on June 26, 1898)	Oulad Said	Ech Chiab	Henchir Bir El Haya
Sousse	Kroussiah	Ammar Ben El Hadj Hassan Ben Abdallah (Started on June 26, 1898)	Oulad Said	Ahel Djema	Henchir Moukad

== Etymology ==
Through history, several civilizations have settled in most parts of Tunisia including the region of Kroussia. Although there has not been huge archeological discoveries in this region, a few artifacts found in different places of Kroussia indicate that if archeologists and historians gave more focus on the area, their efforts would not be in vain.

Al Bahi suggested that Kroussia was the Roman city Chrausa (Greek: Χράῦσα; Arabic: خراسا) based on Ptolemy, which was also designated as Chrabasa (Greek:, Χράβασα; Arabic: خرباسا)in Procopius' texts. Based on Müller and Fischer, Chrausa has the following longitude and latitude in Ptolemy's map: (longitude: 36°; latitude: 32° 40′) and should be located under the city of Hadrumetum (now the city of Sousse) and near Aphrodisius. These coordinates were used to estimate the location of Chrausa in the Map of Ptolemy (produced by SANDERUS Antique maps & books). Abraham Ortelius featured Chrabasa (Chrausa) in the map of North Africa produced in 1590 using the great map of Africa of Giacomo Gastaldi and Siculus Diodorus.

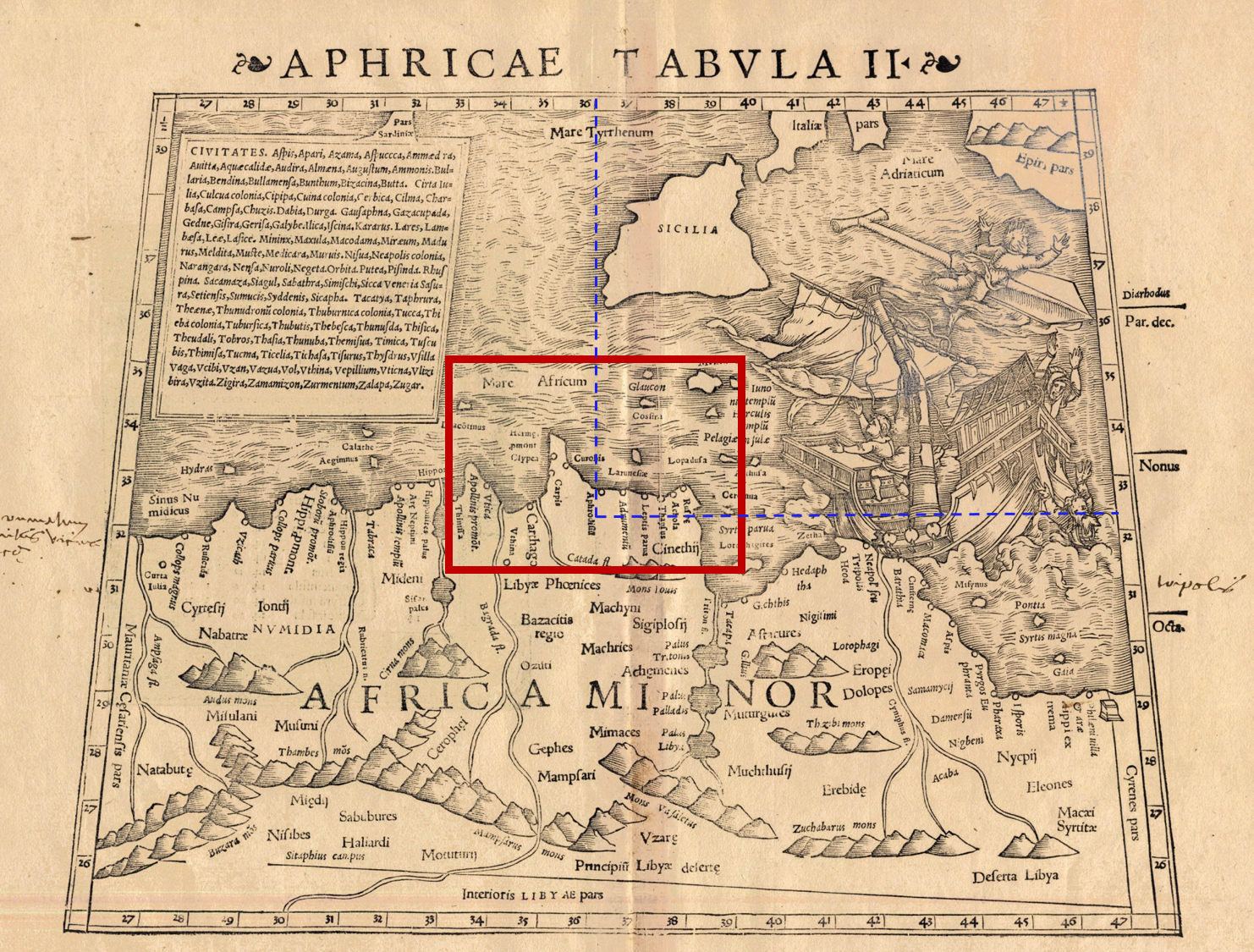
The approximate location of Chrausa in Ptolemy's map.

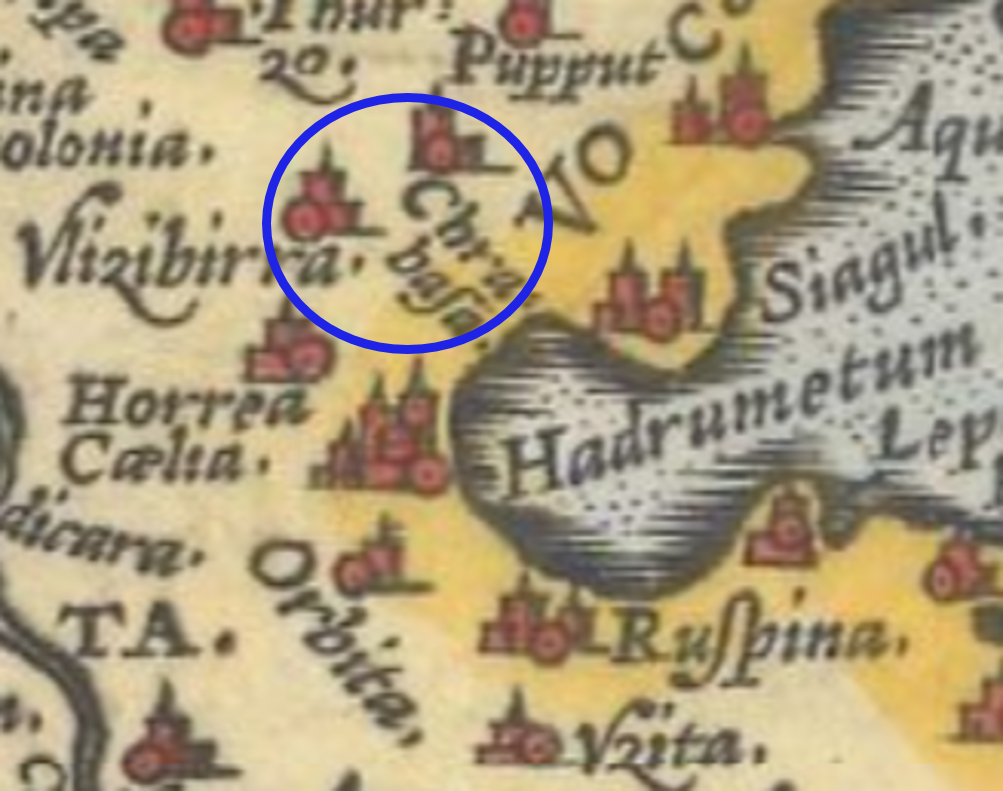
The location of Chrausa (Chrabasa) according to Ortelius.

== History ==
=== The Milestone of Kroussia ===
In 1950, the French archeologist Louis Foucher discovered a grey limestone carved with roman letters in El himer (center of Kroussia), consisting of a Roman milestone. The milestone of Kroussia dates back to the Augustan age (43 b.c. to 18 a.d.) during the time of the Roman proconsul Africanus Fabius Maximus (6 to 5 b.c.). The engravings in the milestone consisted of the following words:

AFRICANVS

FABIVS Q. F.

MAXIMVS

COS VIIVIR

EPVLONVM

PRO COS XXCVII ou XXCXII.

According to Foucher, the seventh line of the engravings XXCVII corresponds to the number 87, which could refer to the distance of a secondary route connecting Sufetula (now known as Sbeitla) to Hadrumetum and passing by Kroussia. This hypothesis was rejected by several researchers since there is lack of evidence that ancient provincial roads existed in the region of Kroussia.

A recent study by Gadhab suggested that the milestone of Kroussia was actually a boundary stone where four juridical territories intersect: 1) Chrausa in the north-west, 2) Gurza (Kalaa Kebira) in the north-east, 3) Vicus Augusti (Sidi El Heni) in the south-west, and 4) Cynazyn (Kneiss) in the south-east. In 1952, the milestone of Kroussia was taken to Sousse Archaeological Museum where it remains until now. Besides the milestone, several Roman stela and coins were found in different locations in the region of Kroussia and were brought as well to Sousse Archaeological Museum. Until today, the residents of Kroussia find some coins and artifacts dating back to different historical eras (e.g., Imperial Rome and Islamic Empire), which may motivate archeologists to proceed the unfinished research in this interesting region.

=== During the French Colonial Rule (1881-1956) ===
In 1881, the French military occupied Tunisia under the name of "French protectorate of Tunisia" few hours after forcing the Bey of Tunis Muhammed Asadiq to sign the treaty of Bardo on May 12, 1881. Few weeks later, the French armed forces started invading the interior parts of Tunisia, taking control of government facilities and civilians' properties. During the time of the French colonization of Tunisia, Kroussia was known as "the domain of Krussiah-Sahali" one of the largest domains in the colony known for massive agricultural activities in the center of Tunisia. This domain was first discovered in 1881 where the French military came across at least 15,000 fighters from different indigenous tribes (Oulad Said, Souassi, Mthellith, Hammama, Zlaaz, and Beni-Zid) who were protecting the saint city of Kairouan.

A few years after discovering the fascinating domain of Krussiah-Sahali, several wealthy families from France were very interested to purchase and invest in this domain through agriculture, e.g., Gandolphe (Owner of Henchir Stah until 1891), Bonhoure (Owner of the domain of Krussiah from 1883 to 1899), Revocat (Co-owner of the domain of Krussiah in 1883-1896), Drumont (Owner of the domain of Sahali from 1896 until 1900), and others. Prior to 1883, the domain of Krussia (3,000 hectares) belonged to the family of Bouraoui from Kalaa Sghira before it was purchased by Bonhoure and Revocat at 2,200 franc. Eugene Bonhoure (1832-1914), is a Parisian journalist and lawyer, who broke up with his association with Revocat in 1896 to become the only owner of the domain of Krussiah. Bonhoure, being very occupied with journalism and politics, decided to hire a French colon Auguste Cartier to manage his vast property. Several managers had proceeded Cartier in the domain of Krussiah, such as Saumagne, one of the biggest pioneers of colonization in Kairouan, but no one achieved what Cartier did with Bonhoure's property. In the Tunisian Review published in 1910, P. Ducroquet (one of the authors of the review) described Cartier as energetic, vivacious, and clever. Cartier started working for Bonhoure in the domain of Krussiah at the age of 50. Before leaving Gard (France) to settle in the domain of Krussiah along with his elder brother Charles Cartier, his wife and her brother. Auguste Cartier had a lengthy experience with agriculture in his hometown, which made him a good fit for the position offered by Bonhoure.
