= Gazzah (surname) =

Gazzah (Arabic pronunciation: [ˈالقزاح]) is a surname found in Tunisia, mainly in Msaken but also in Sousse, Hammam Sousse, Kalaa Kebira and Kalaa Seghira, in the Sahel region of Tunisia. This surname can also be written with the following ways: (with or without 'EL'):

- Gazzeh
- Gazah
- Gazeh
- Guezah
- Guezzah

== Branches ==
- Garfatta Gazzah
- Souissi Gazzah
- Boukhriss Gazzah
- Haj Deeb (Jordan)
- Haj Saken (Jordan, Palestine)

== Meaning ==
The surname Gazzah refers to a plant found in North Africa

== DNA Haplogroup ==
- One sample from Gazzah family in Msaken was found by Family Tree DNA as belonging to Y Chromosome DNA Haplogroup J-L271, a branch of Haplogroup J-M172, the same haplogroup was also found among most of Msaken samples belonging to different surnames.
- Another sample from Gazzah family in Kalaa Kebira was found by the same company as belonging to Y chromosome DNA Haplogroup E-M81, which is the dominant Haplogroup in North Africa
