= Msaken Affair 1964 =

The Msaken Affair was an event in 15 December 1964 in which 4000 peasants from M'saken, Sousse rioted against the collective farming policy of Bourguibist socialism. 177 farmers were forcefully obligated to abandon their cooperatives and uproot the 80000 olive trees they own, then form new cooperatives to replace them with fruit trees. Tahar Belkhodja notes that Sousse's governor at the time Amor Chachia, had sent "Fans of Collectivism" during the night to mark thousands of olive trees with red paint, then when the locals woke up, they started revolting. Dozens were subsequently arrested, while the seven party cells that supported the farmers were dissolved. Bourguiba then announced that the government is ready to hand-back the lands of the citizens.
