= Sidi El Hani =

Coordinates: 35°40′N 10°19′E

Sidi El Hani (سيدي الهاني) Vicus Augusti
- Commune and town
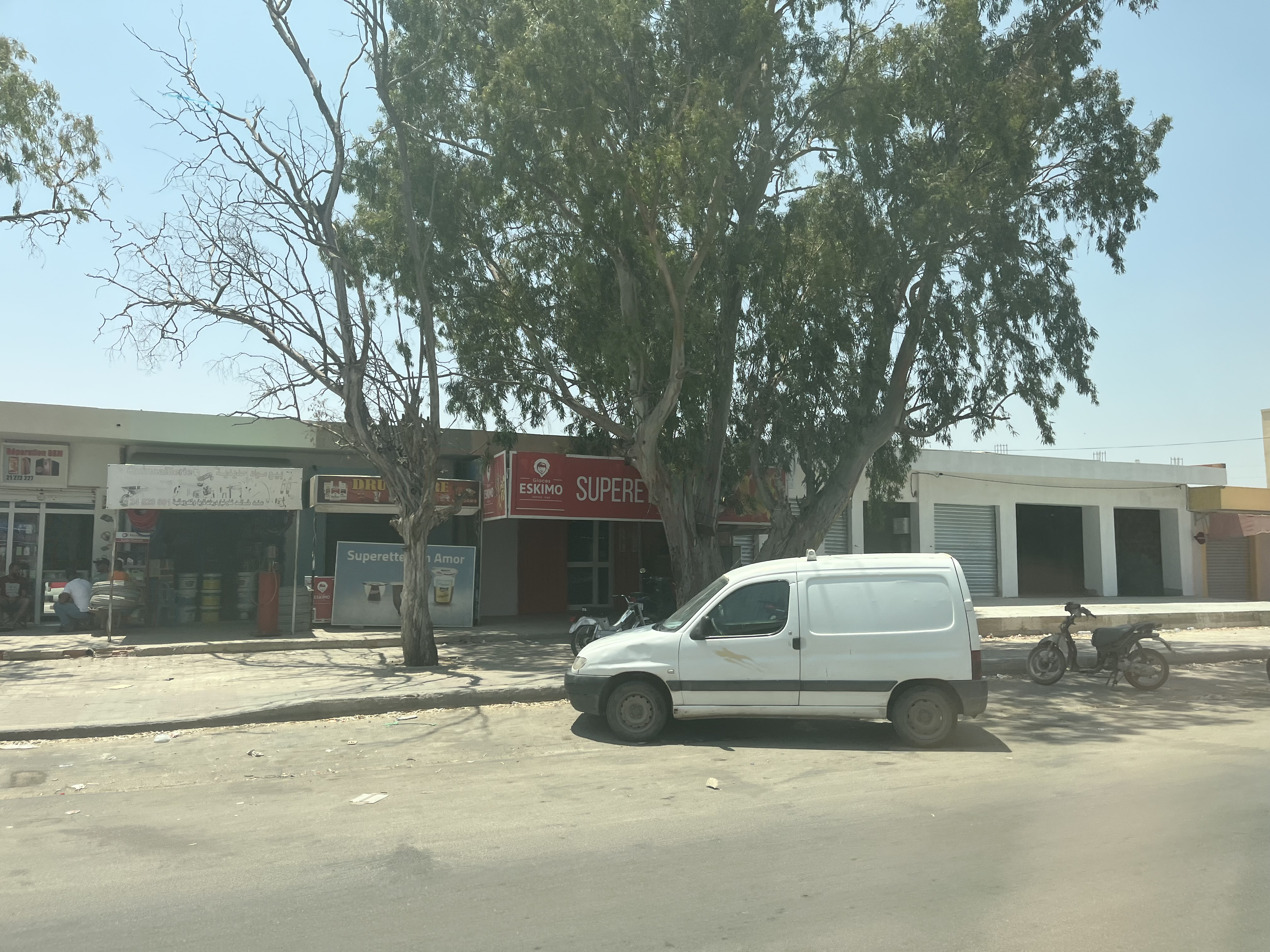
- Interactive map of Sidi El Hani
- Country: Tunisia
- Governorate: Sousse Governorate
- Delegation(s): Sidi El Hani

Government
  - Mayor: Mohamed Jliti (Nidaa Tounes)

Population (2014)
  - Total: 2,651
- Time zone: UTC+1 (CET)
- Postal code: 4025

Sidi El Hani (or Sidi Al-Hani) (سيدي الهاني) is a town and commune in the Sousse Governorate, Tunisia located at 35.67n, 10.30e. As of 2004 it had a population of 3,058. It gives its name to the largest lake of the governorate, a natural salt lake or salt pan (sabkha) in dry seasons, the Sebkhet de Sidi El Hani which is shared with between one and two other areas depending on precipitation and its maximum extent forms the official boundary with part of a third, Monastir Governorate. The town is 30 km south-west of the coast, its straightest connection being by Tunisian Railways, with a secondary connection by road, the P12 road which is a principal road to Kairouan from the A1 a few kilometres to the east. it is 19 km from Kairouan and 26 km from Raqqada.

== History ==
During the Roman Empire Sidi El Hani was a Roman town of the Province of Africa Proconsularae. The remains a large amphitheater are still seen. The town was known as Quartz August (Street of Augustus) or vicus Augustii (the Village of Augustus) and was active from 30 BC to AD 640.

In Late Antiquity Sidi El Hani was the seat of a Christian Bishopric, and remains a titular bishopric of the Roman Catholic Church.

== See also ==
- List of cities in Tunisia
- Kroussia
- Sahali
- VICUS LAURENTIUM AUGUSTANORUM archaeology report.
