= Bir el-Bey train collision =

2010 train accident in Tunisia

Coordinates: 36°42′36.84″N 10°22′44.04″E

Details
- Date: 24 September 2010; 15:00 local time (14:00 UTC)
- Location: Bir el-Bey
- Country: Tunisia
- Incident type: Collision
- Cause: Reduced visibility from heavy rain storm

Statistics
- Trains: 2
- Deaths: 1
- Injured: 57

The Bir el-Bey train collision occurred on 24 September 2010, at Bir el-Bey, Tunisia, when two trains collided with each other. One person reportedly died as a result of the accident, and 57 people were reported injured.

== Accident ==
A train coming from Tunisia's Sfax derailed and toppled over after being hit by the other train at the tail wagon at 3 p.m. local time (14:00 UTC) at Bir el-Bey train station.

== Cause ==
The collision was caused by poor visibility, the result of a violent rainstorm.
