= Zaouiet Sousse =

Coordinates: 35°47′N 10°38′E

Zaouiet Sousse زاوية سوسة
- Commune and town
- Interactive map of Zaouiet Sousse
- Country: Tunisia
- Governorate: Sousse Governorate
- Delegation(s): Zaouiet Ksibet Thrayet

Government
  - Mayor: Youssef Toumi (Republican People’s Union)

Population (2014)
  - Total: 20,681
- Time zone: UTC+1 (CET)
- Postal code: 4081

Zaouiet Sousse is a town and commune in the Sousse Governorate, Tunisia. As of 2014 it had a population of 20,681.

It constitutes an agricultural village essentially centered on olive growing and cattle breeding. It is also a major producer of milk, transported from a collection center to the dairies of Sidi Bou Ali.

== Population ==
2014 Census (Municipal)
Homes	Families	Males	Females	Total
5463	5096	10671	10321	20992

== See also ==
- List of cities in Tunisia
