= Akouda =

Akouda أكودة
- Commune and town
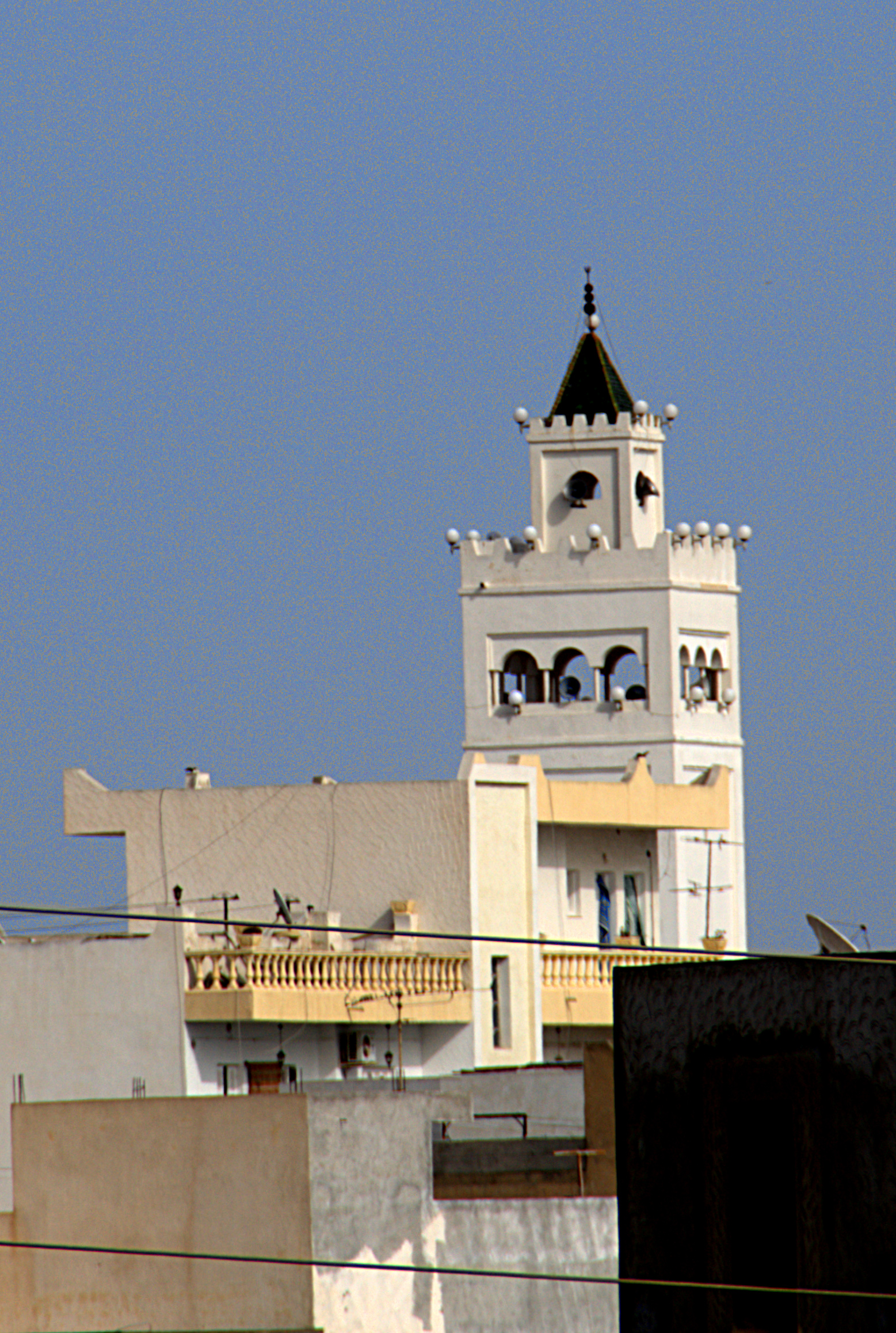
- Minaret of the great mosque of Akouda.

- Location in Tunisia
- Coordinates: 35°52′17″N 10°34′11″E
- Country: Tunisia
- Governorate: Sousse Governorate
- Delegation(s): Akouda

Government
  - Mayor: Nabil Ben Amor (Nidaa Tounes)

Population (2022)
  - Total: 31,938
- Time zone: UTC1 (CET)
- Postal code: 4022
- Website: www.commune-akouda.gov.tn

Akouda (Arabic: أكودة) is a small town located a few kilometres north of Sousse, Tunisia.

Administratively attached to the Sousse Governorate, it is the chief town of a delegation of the same name which in 2004 had 21,237 inhabitants, with 18,998 for the town itself. Set back from the coast, along the RN1, it is connected to the coast at Chott Meriem.

== Notable people ==
- Ridha Charfeddine - businessman
- Salem Ben Hmida - poet
- Saddam Ben Aziza - footballer
