= Jalila Hafsia =

Tunisian writer (1927–2023)

- جليلة حفصية
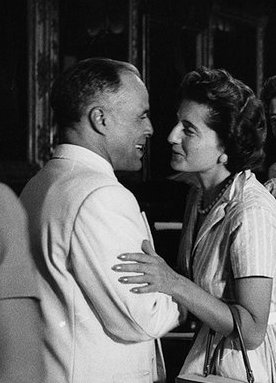
- Hafsia (right) greeting Habib Bourguiba in 1957
- Born: 17 October 1927; M'saken, Sousse, French Tunisia
- Died: 10 August 2023 (aged 95); Tunis
- Occupations: Writer, journalist
- Writing career
- Language: Arabic, French
- Notable work: Ash at Dawn (Cendres à l’aube)

Jalila Hafsia (Arabic: جليلة حفصية; 17 October 1927 – 10 August 2023) was a Tunisian writer who published one of the first Tunisian novels written in French.

== Biography ==
Jalila Hafsia was born in M'saken on 17 October 1927. After receiving her education she worked for several cultural institutions, eventually serving as director of the Tahar Haddad Cultural Club, a prominent cultural club often associated with women writers. In 1975 she published Ash at Dawn (Cendres à l’aube), one of the first novels by a Tunisian woman to be written in French.

Hafsia was an admirer of Simone de Beauvoir, with whom she corresponded. In 2019 she was named a grand officer of the Tunisian Order of the Republic for her cultural achievements.

Jalila Hafsia died on 10 August 2023 in Tunis, at the age of 95.

== Honors ==
In 2019, Jalila Hafsia was awarded the insignia of Grand Officer of the Tunisian Order of Merit.
