= Beni Kalthoum =

Beni Kalthoum بني كلثوم
- Village
- Location in Tunisia Beni Kalthoum (Middle East) Beni Kalthoum (Africa)
- Coordinates: 35°42′05″N 10°35′20″E
- Country: Tunisia
- Governorate: Sousse

Beni Kalthoum is a village located in Msaken region, Sousse governorate, Tunisia at a distance of 2 km (1.2 mi) to the south of Msaken. Administratively, it's an imada, part of the M'saken delegation.
