= Messaadine =

Coordinates: 35°45′43″N 10°35′43″E

- Commune and town
- Interactive map of Messaadine
- Country: Tunisia
- Governorate: Sousse Governorate
- Delegation(s): M'saken

Population (2022)
  - Total: 13,766
- Time zone: UTC+1 (CET)
- Postal code: 4013
- Website: www.commune-messadine.gov.tn

Messaadine or Messaâdine is a town and commune in the Sousse Governorate, Tunisia, located four kilometres northeast of M'saken and seven kilometres southwest of Sousse, along Route RN1, a highway connecting Sousse and M'saken. Administratively part of M'saken, it had a population of 12,916 inhabitants in 2014. Administratively, it's an imada, part of the M'saken delegation.

== History ==
The town is said to have been named by Abi-Said, an Ibadite living during the 13th Century of the Islamic lunar calendar

== Economy ==
The economy of Messaadine is based mostly on the textile industry, with textile factories located in and around the city. There is also an automotive industry, with both important industry sectors relying mainly on private investments.

== Culture ==
There is an annual arts festival in the town between July and August.

== Sport ==
The town is known for the sporting success of its female rugby team, Club Sportif de Messaadine.

== See also ==
- List of cities in Tunisia
