= Hergla =

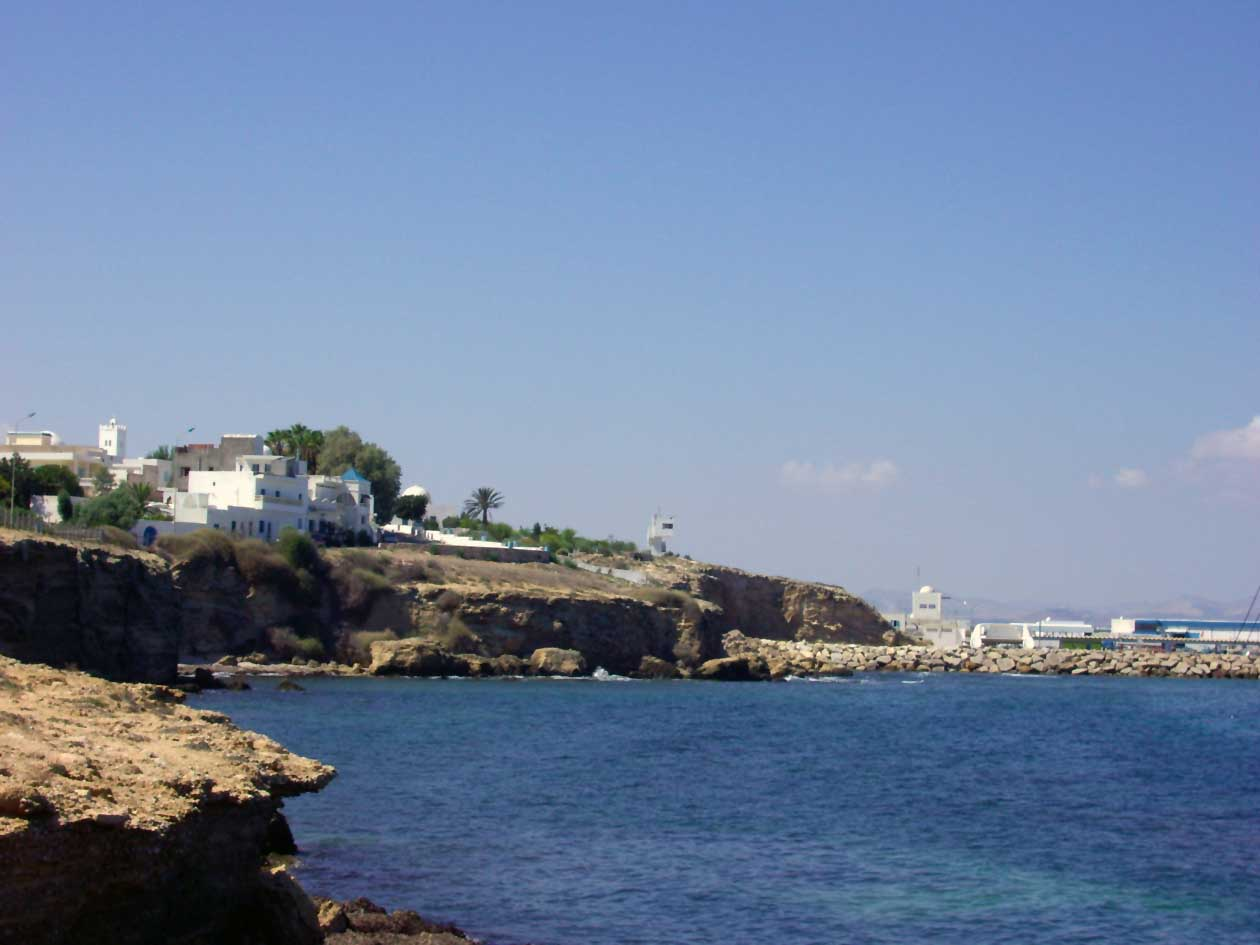
- Hergla with harbour

- Location in Tunisia
- Coordinates: 36°2′0″N 10°30′0″E
- Country: Tunisia
- Governorate: Sousse Governorate
- Delegation(s): Hergla

Government
  - Mayor: Leila Mourad (Nidaa Tounes)

Population (2022)
  - Total: 10,014
- Time zone: UTC1 (CET)

Hergla (Arabic: هرقلة) is a small cliff-top town in north-eastern Tunisia at the Gulf of Hammamet. White houses of Hergla with often blue window and door surroundings are built in the classic style characteristic for Tunisia. Sousse is about 24 km south-east of Hergla. There is a lagoon between Hergla and its neighbour town Chott Meryem in the south-east called Halk el menzel (sickle lake).

== History ==
Both Roman and Byzantine ruins are found along the shore. Under Roman rule, Hergla was known as Horrea Caelia. It is unclear whether the name derived from Punic, the Greek demigod Hercules, or Latin words for storehouses (horrea) or frontier. The first theory is supported by attestation of the presence of a Roman family known as the Caelii. In the 3rd century, Horrea Caelia was a border town between the districts of Byzacena (capital Hadrumete, present-day Sousse) and Zeugitana (capital Carthage). In the 6th century, the Byzantine Empire established a fortress. During the Arab conquest in the 7th century, the residents of the city were massacred.

== Buildings ==
In the centre of the old village close to the seaside is the 18th-century Sidi Bou Mendil Mosque, which dominates the town. Nearby there is the cemetery of Hergla with historic tombs and the mausoleum of Sidi Bou Mendil. Sidi Bou Mendil, stemming originally from Morocco, is said, according to local legends, having returned from a pilgrimage to Mecca on a flying handkerchief. Hergla has two other historic mosques.

== Cinema ==
Since 2005, the African Mediterranean Cultural Association has been organizing the Hergla Film Meetings each summer. Evenings of film screenings and music concerts are given in an oil mill and training workshops, debates and exhibitions are held at the House of Culture of Hergla. Internationally renowned artists participated, such as Sotigui Kouyate, Mohammed Bakri, Nouri Bouzid, Wasis Diop and Afel Bocoum.

== Economy ==
Unlike close touristic centres Hammamet and Port El Kantaoui Hergla has not much tourism. There is a little fishermen's harbour. Important products are baskets from esparto. Hotels still do not exist. Plans to build a large touristic center are stalled. Many people are employed in the touristic centers between Port el Kantaoui and Sousse. Furthermore, there is a dorade farm.

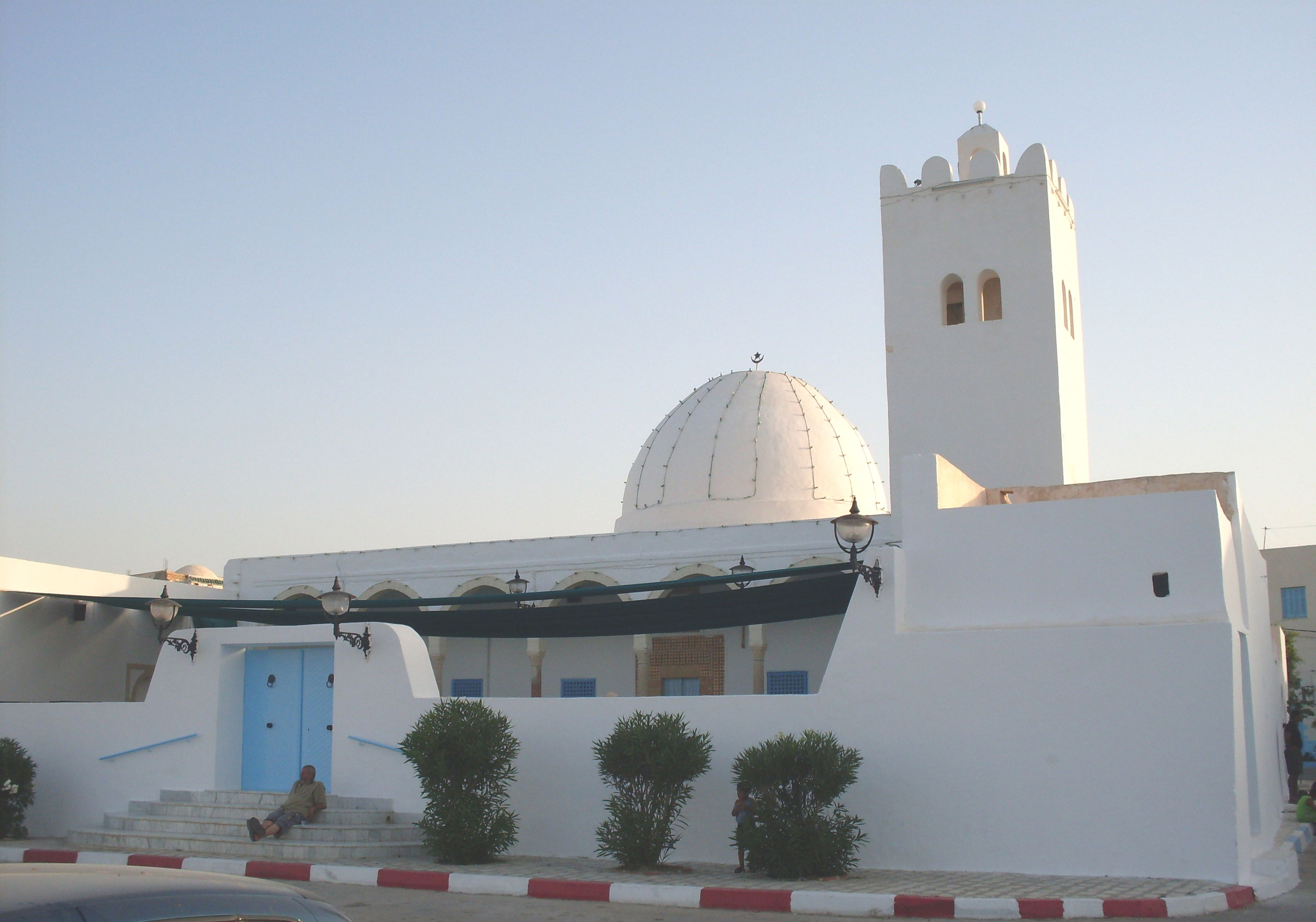
The mosque Sidi Bou Mendil in Hergla

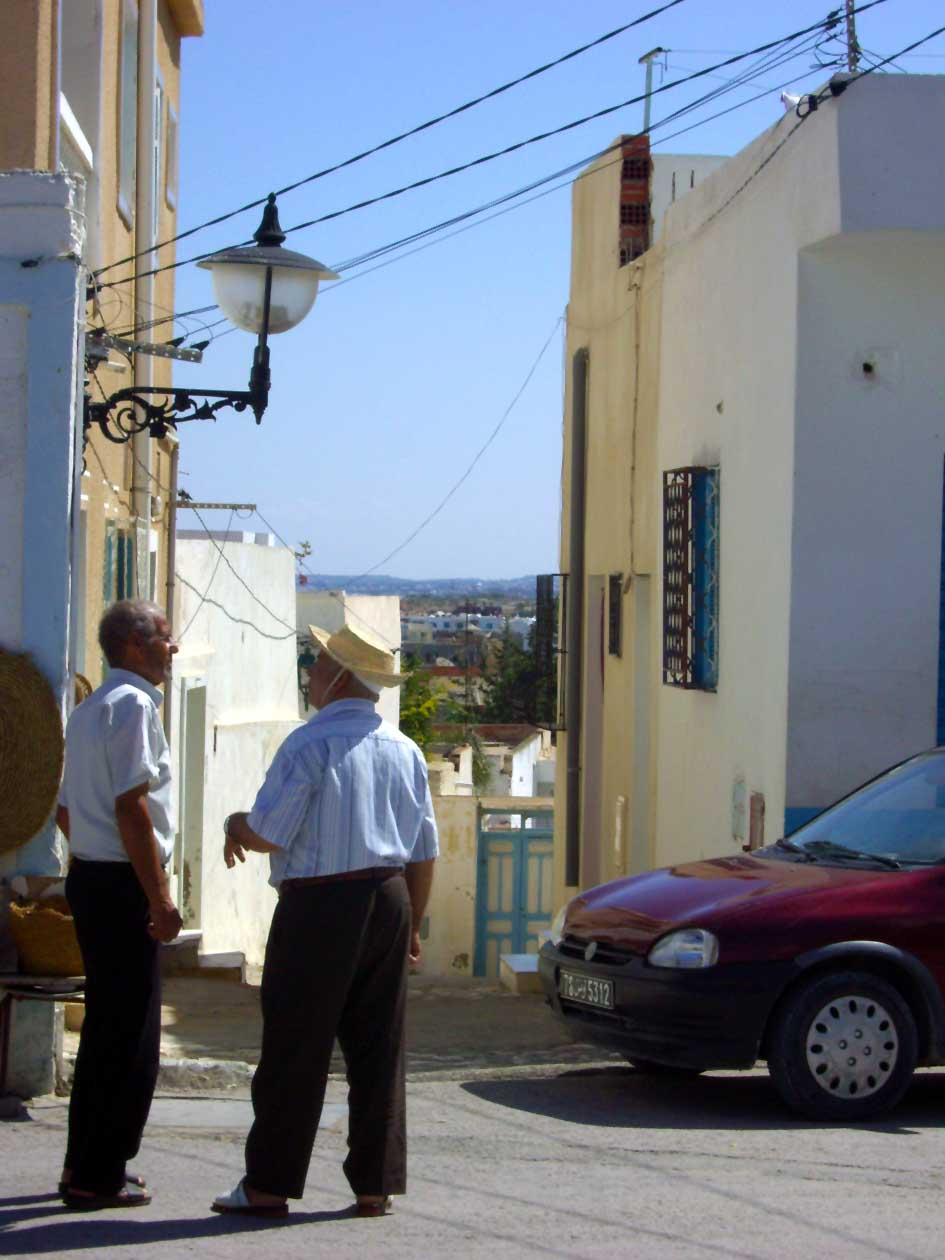
Villagepeople

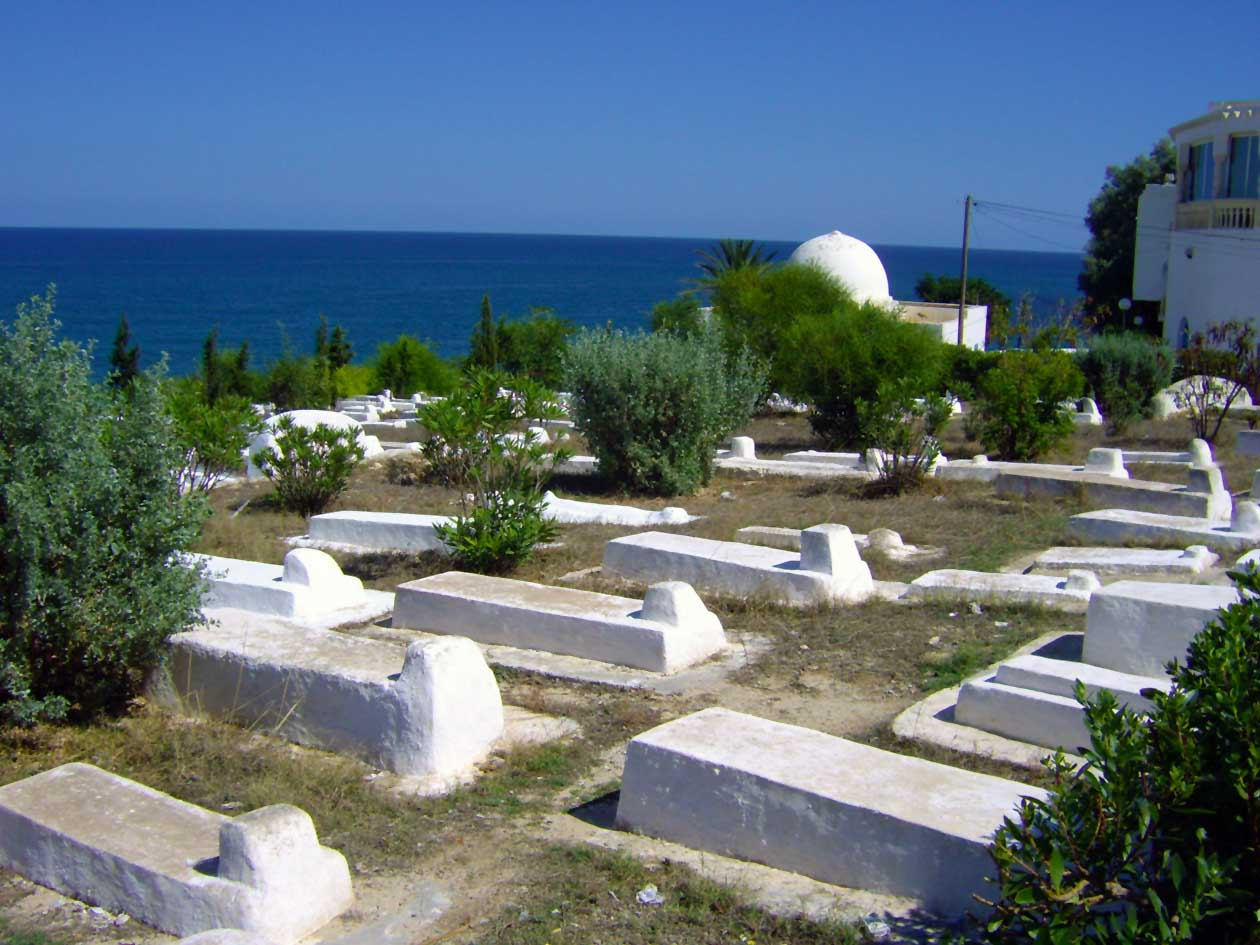
Cemetery of Hergla
