= Mahmoud Kalboussi =

Tunisian runner (born 1965)

Personal information
- Born: 9 February 1965 (age 61) Akouda, Tunisia
- Height: 1.85 m (6 ft 1 in)
- Weight: 65 kg (143 lb)

Sport
- Sport: Athletics
- Events: 1500 m, 3000 m, 5000 m
- Club: CS Garde National
Medal record
Men's athletics
Representing Tunisia
African Championships
Silver medal – second place	1988 Annaba	1500 m

Mahmoud Kalboussi (Arabic: محمود الكلبوسي; born 9 February 1965 in Akouda) is a retired Tunisian athlete who competed in middle- and long-distance events. He represented his country at the 1988 and 1992 Summer Olympics as well as two World Indoor Championships.

== Competition record ==
Year	Competition	Venue	Position	Event	Notes
Representing Tunisia
1988	African Championships	Annaba, Algeria	2nd	1500 m	3:43.44
1988	Olympic Games	Seoul, South Korea	31st (h)	1500 m	3:43.72
1989	Jeux de la Francophonie	Casablanca, Morocco	4th	1500 m	3:40.89
1989	Arab Championships	Cairo, Egypt	3rd	1500 m	3:41.7
1991	World Indoor Championships	Seville, Spain	13th (h)	3000 m	7:53.75
1991	Mediterranean Games	Athens, Greece	7th	1500 m	3:44.24
1992	Olympic Games	Barcelona, Spain	32nd (h)	5000 m	13:55.01
1995	World Indoor Championships	Barcelona, Spain	18th (h)	3000 m	8:05.60

== Personal bests ==
Outdoor

- 1000 meters – 2:18.09 (Grosseto 1990)
- 1500 meters – 3:35.73 (Nice 1992)
- One mile – 3:57.00 (Lausanne 1990) NR
- 3000 meters – 7:47.92 (Arnsberg 1995) NR
- 5000 meters – 13:32.84 (Caserta 1992) NR

Indoor

- 3000 meters – 7:53.75 (Seville 1991)
- 5000 meters – 13:56.95 (San Sebastián 1995)
