= M'saken Delegation =

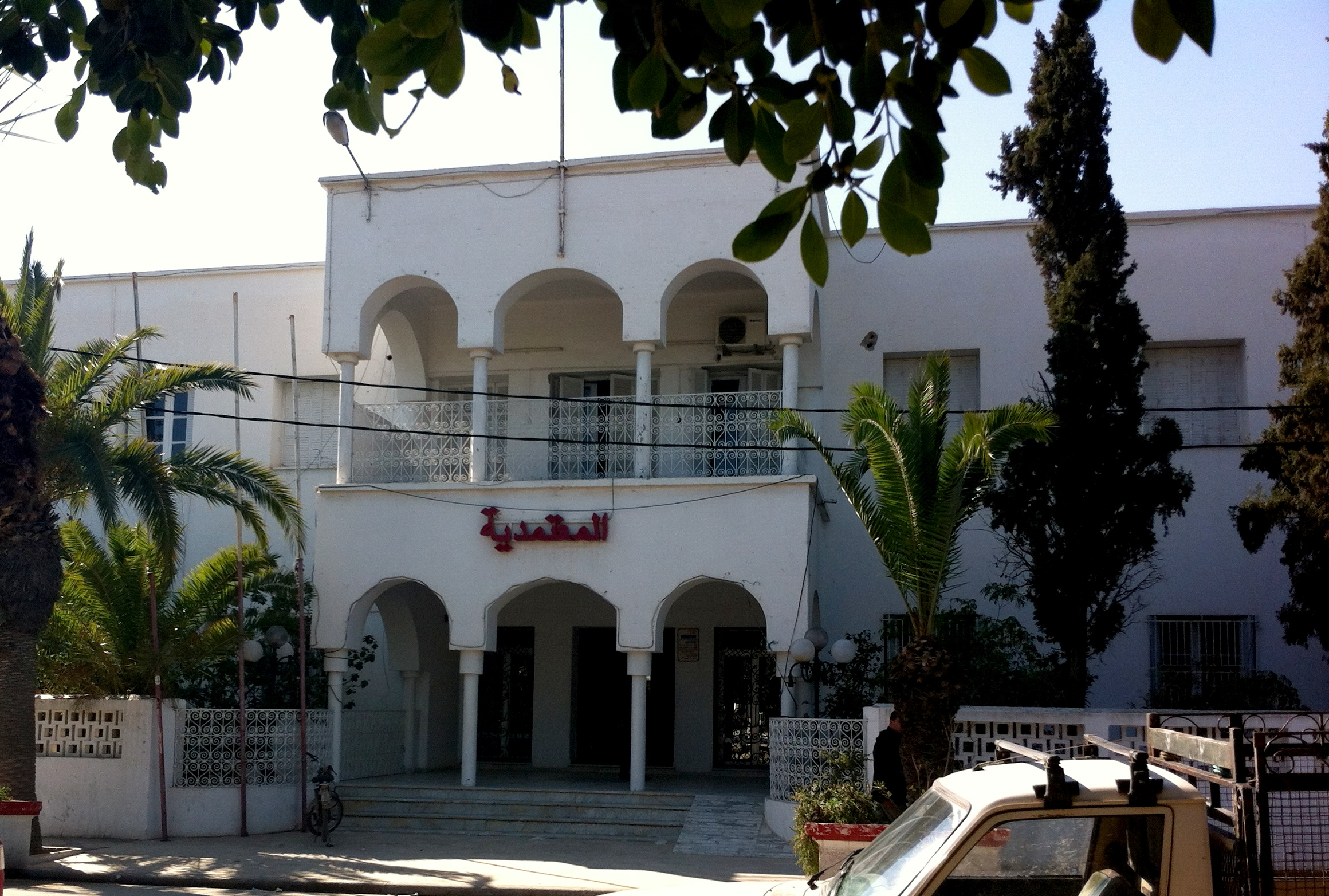
Headquarters of the M'saken city delegation

M'saken Delegation (Arabic: معتمدية مساكن) is a delegation (district) of the Sousse Governorate in Central East Tunisia. As of 2024 census it had a population of 97,312, up from 85,380 in 2004. Its administrative centre is the commune and city of M'saken.

== Administrative divisions ==
The delegation consists of the following Imadets (sectors): Beni Rabiâa, Beni Kalthoum, Borjine, Nejajra, El Touara Nord, Eltouara el Janoubia, Messadine, Jeddine, Jebline, Habib Thameur, Mouredine, El Gherbine, El Kebline, Emour, and El Frady.

== See also ==
- Delegations of Tunisia
