= Yacoubi =

Yacoubi is a surname. Notable people with the surname include:

- Ahmed Yacoubi (1928–1985), Moroccan painter and storyteller.
- Ala Yacoubi, Tunisian rapper
- Hichem Yacoubi (born 1964), Tunisian-born French actor
- Mohamed Ali Yacoubi (born 1990), Tunisian footballer
- Seifeddine Rezgui Yacoubi (1992–2015), Tunisian mass murderer
- Souad Yacoubi (born 1938), Tunisian politician
