= Ksibet Thrayet =

Ksibet Thrayet قصيبة الثريات
- Commune and town
- Location within Tunisia
- Coordinates: 35°45′36″N 10°37′12″E
- Country: Tunisia
- Governorate: Sousse Governorate
- Delegation(s): Zaouiet Ksibet Thrayet

Government
  - Mayor: Mohamed Bouassida (Independent)

Population (2014)
  - Total: 11,623
- Time zone: UTC+1 (CET)
- Postal_code: 4041
- Website: commune-ksibet-thrayet.gov.tn

Ksibet is a town and commune in the Sousse Governorate, Tunisia. As of 2014 it had a population of 11,623.

== See also ==
- List of cities in Tunisia
