= Ezzouhour =

Ezzouhour الزهور
- Commune and town
- Interactive map of Ezzouhour
- Coordinates: 35°49′12″N 10°36′00″E
- Country: Tunisia
- Governorate: Sousse Governorate
- Delegation(s): Sousse Riadh

Government
  - Mayor: Youssef Ben Brahim (Independent)

Population (2014)
  - Total: 17,348
- Time zone: UTC+1 (CET)
- Postal code: 4031

Ezzouhour (Arabic: الزهور; meaning: The Flowers) is a town and commune in the Sousse Governorate, Tunisia. As of 2014 it had a population of 17,348. Ezzouhour was originally a spontaneous locality that formed as migrants from the countryside of other areas of Sousse and the neighbouring governorate of Kairouan settled there. It was then connected to public services and integrated in the urban area of Sousse.

== See also ==
- List of cities in Tunisia
