= Beni Rabiâa =

Village in Tunisia, near Msaken region

Beni Rabiâa is a village located in Msaken region, Sousse governorate, Tunisia at a distance of 6 km to the south west of Msaken. Administratively, it's an imada, part of the M'saken delegation.
