= Kondar, Tunisia =

Coordinates: 35°55′48″N 10°18′00″E

Kondar كندار
- Commune and town
- Interactive map of Kondar
- Country: Tunisia
- Governorate: Sousse Governorate
- Delegation(s): Kondar

Government
  - Mayor: Ali Ben Mime (Nidaa Tounes)

Population (2014)
  - Total: 3,816
- Time zone: UTC+1 (CET)
- Postal code: 4020

Kondar is a town and commune in the Sousse Governorate, Tunisia. As of 2014 it had a population of 3,816. It is the capital of the Kondar delegation.

== Population ==
2014 Census (Municipal)
Homes	Families	Males	Females	Total
886	849	1889	1915	3804

== See also ==
- List of cities in Tunisia
