= Salem Ben Hmida =

Tunisian poet

Salem Ben Hmida (Arabic: سالم بن حميدة) was a Tunisian poet. He was born in 1882 and died in 1961.

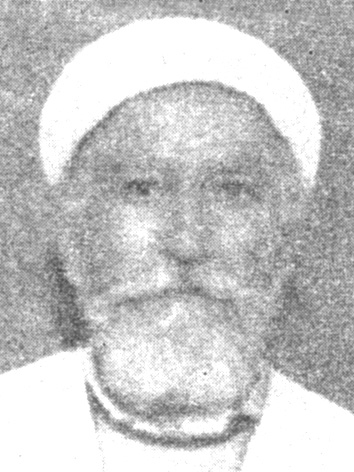
Salem ben Hmida

Born in Akouda, just north of Sousse, he studied at the University of Ez-Zitouna. In 1947, he chaired the Sahelian cooperation within the Tunisian General Labour Union.

He published a book of poems entitled Azzahriyyet. Today there is a road in Sousse and several schools named after him.
