= Sidi Bou Ali =

Coordinates: 35°57′22″N 10°28′20″E

- Commune and town
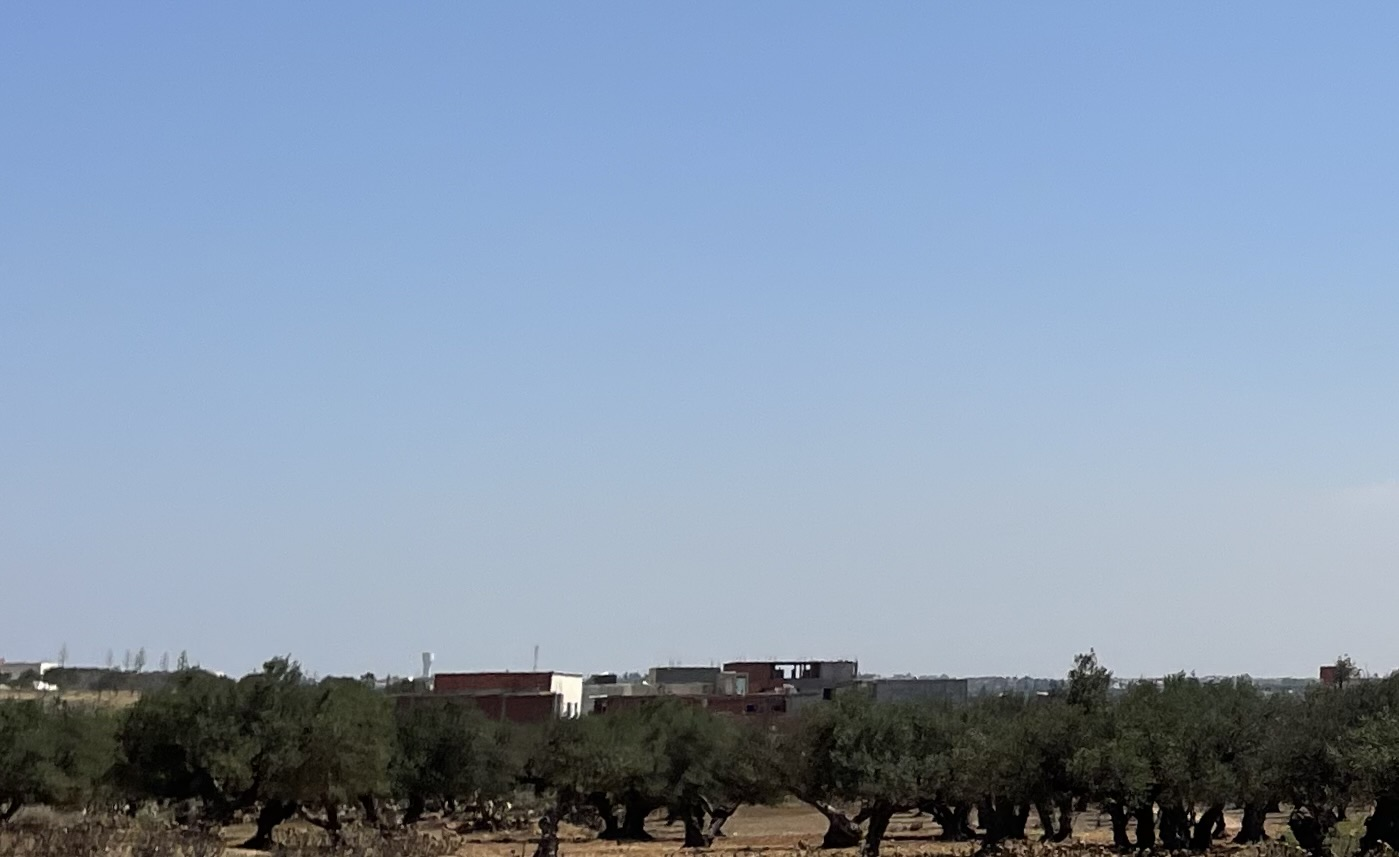
- Interactive map of Sidi Bou Ali
- Country: Tunisia
- Governorate: Sousse Governorate
- Delegation(s): Sidi Bou Ali

Government
  - Mayor: Brahim Boubaker (Independent)

Population (2024)
  - Total: 10,464
- Time zone: UTC+1 (CET)
- Postal code: 4040

Sidi Bou Ali is a town and commune in the Sousse Governorate, Tunisia. As of 2024 it had a population of 10,464.

== Ancient history ==
During the Roman occupation of present-day Tunisia, Sidi Bou Ali was known as Ulissipira. The only remnant of the town is an amphitheater, located to the west of the city's present-day location.

== See also ==
- List of cities in Tunisia
