= Chott Meriem =

Coordinates: 35.9356°N 10.5572°E

Chott Meriem شط مريم
- Commune and town
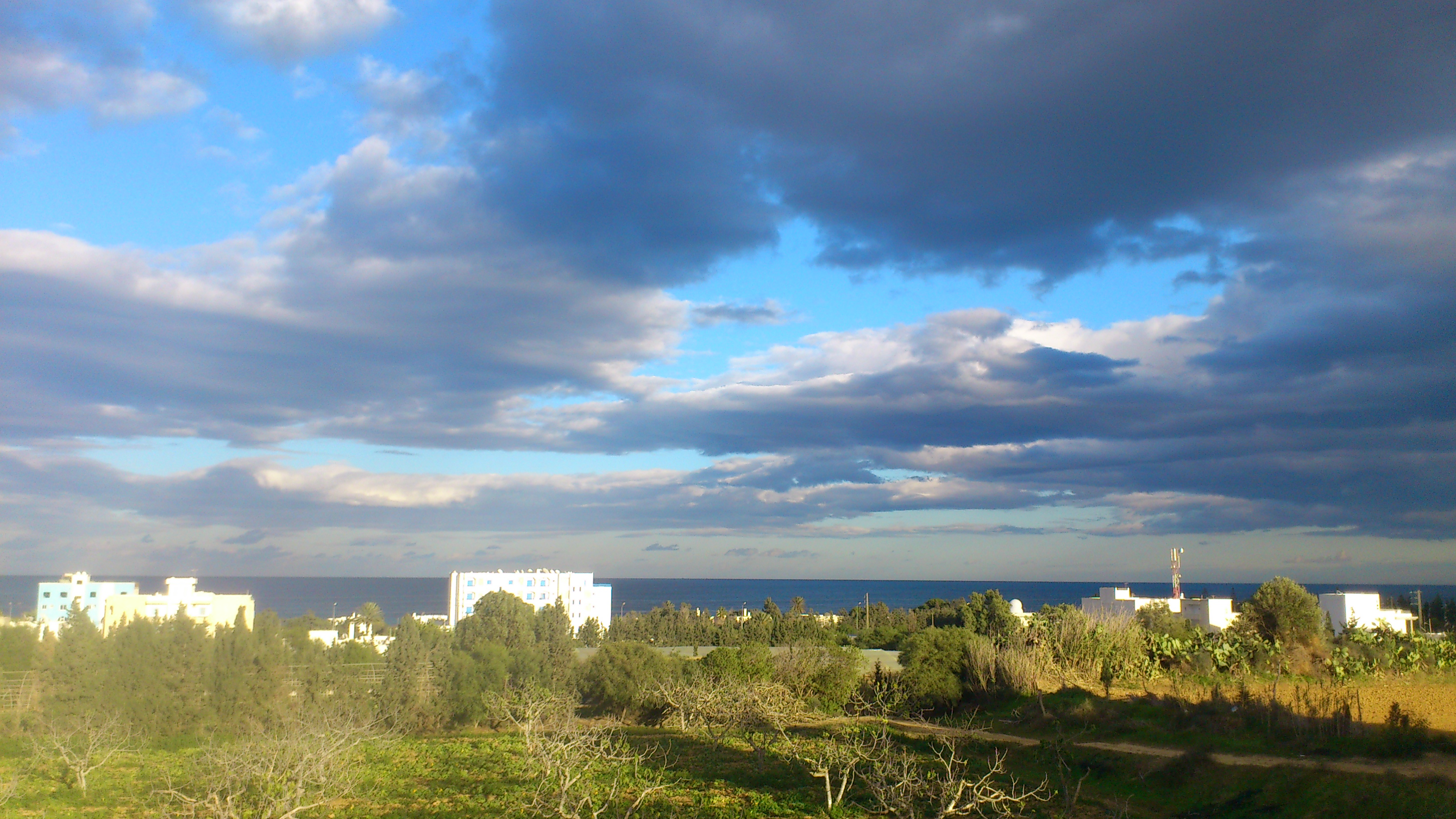

- Location in Tunisia
- Country: Tunisia
- Governorate: Sousse Governorate
- Delegation(s): Akouda

Government
  - Mayor: Samir Ladhari (Independent)
- Time zone: UTC1 (CET)
- Postal code: 4042

Chott Meriem is a city of the Sahel, Tunisia located on the Mediterranean coast just north of Sousse .

Attached to the Sousse governorate, the municipality created in 2016 is divided into two districts. In 2014, it had 7294 inhabitants spread over an area of 2160 hectares. It is located at 35° 56'17"n,10° 33'18"e.

Known for its beach, is located north of the towns of Sousse, in Sousse and south of Hergla. The seaside resort of Port El Kantaoui is located nearby. It is a popular destination during the summer, many families renting houses along the beach. Due to climatic conditions, Chott Meriem is also known as a center of agriculture. It also contains the higher agricultural Institute of Chott Meriem.
