= M'saken =

Town in Sousse Governorate, Tunisia

M'saken مساكن
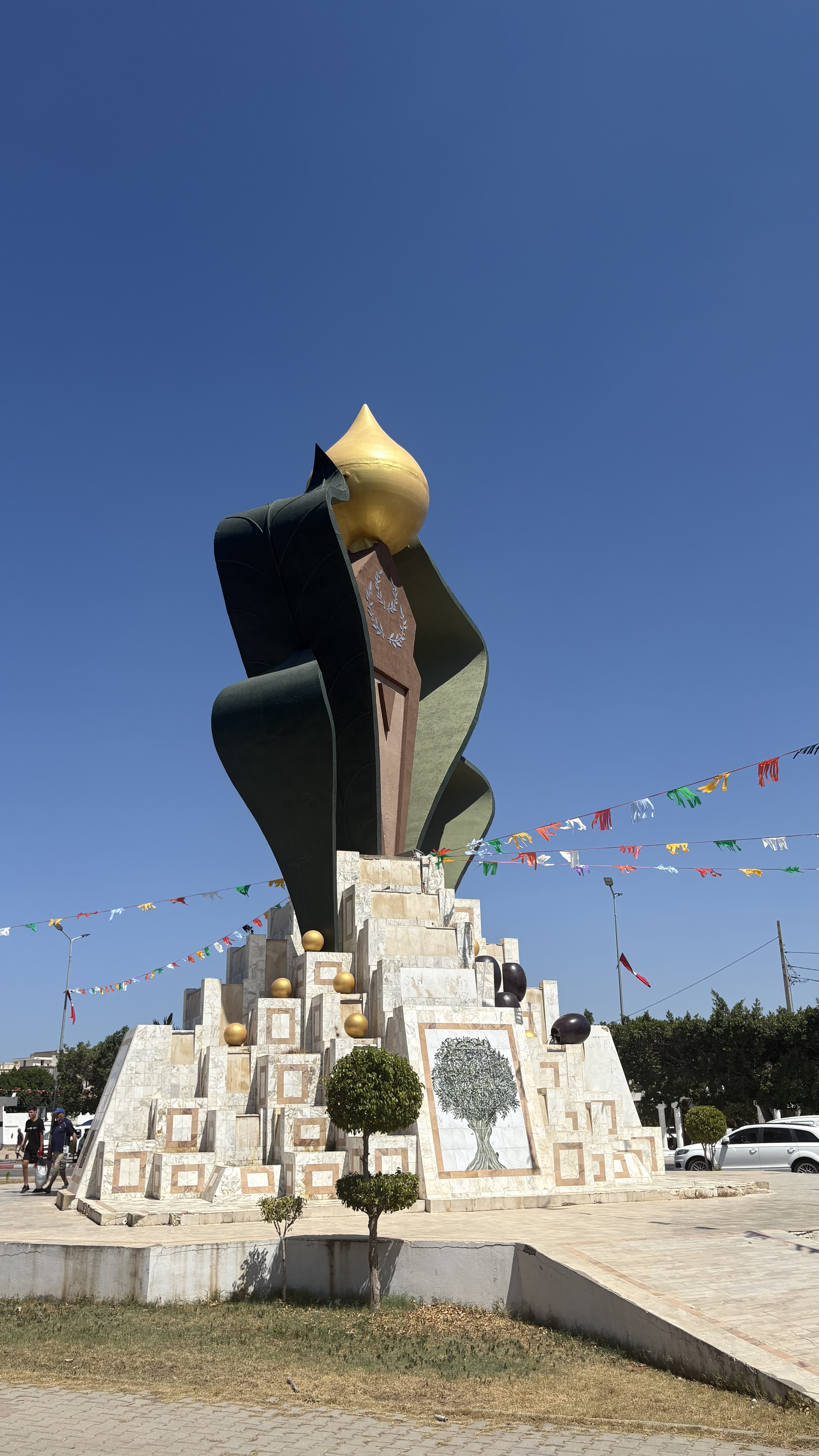
- Monument in M'saken city center 2012

- Location in Tunisia
- Coordinates: 35°44′0″N 10°35′0″E
- Country: Tunisia
- Governorate: Sousse Governorate
- Delegation(s): M'saken

Government
  - Mayor: Mohamed Alaya (Ennahda)
  - Vice Mayor: Zoubeir Graïet
- Elevation: 469 ft (143 m)

Population (2022)
  - Total: 89,745
- Time zone: UTC1 (CET)
- Postal code: 4070
- Area code: 216
- Website: http://www.commune-msaken.gov.tn

M'saken (Arabic: مساكن Msākan; also spelled Masakin, Msaken) is a town in north-eastern Tunisia, close to Sousse. The town is the administrative center of the M'saken Delegation (district) of the same name, which at the 2014 Census had a population of 97,225.

== Etymology ==
The word "Msaken" in Arabic means "habitats", "houses" or "dwellings", referring to the houses of al-Ashraf.

== Municipality ==
The M'saken Municipality was founded in 19 February 1921. The actual municipal council was elected in the Local elections of Tunisia on 9 May 2018. Its composition by party is as follows:

Party	Seats
Ennahdha	12
Nidaa Tounes	5
Courant démocrate	4
Msakin Tourid (independent list)	3
Front populaire	2
Union civile	2

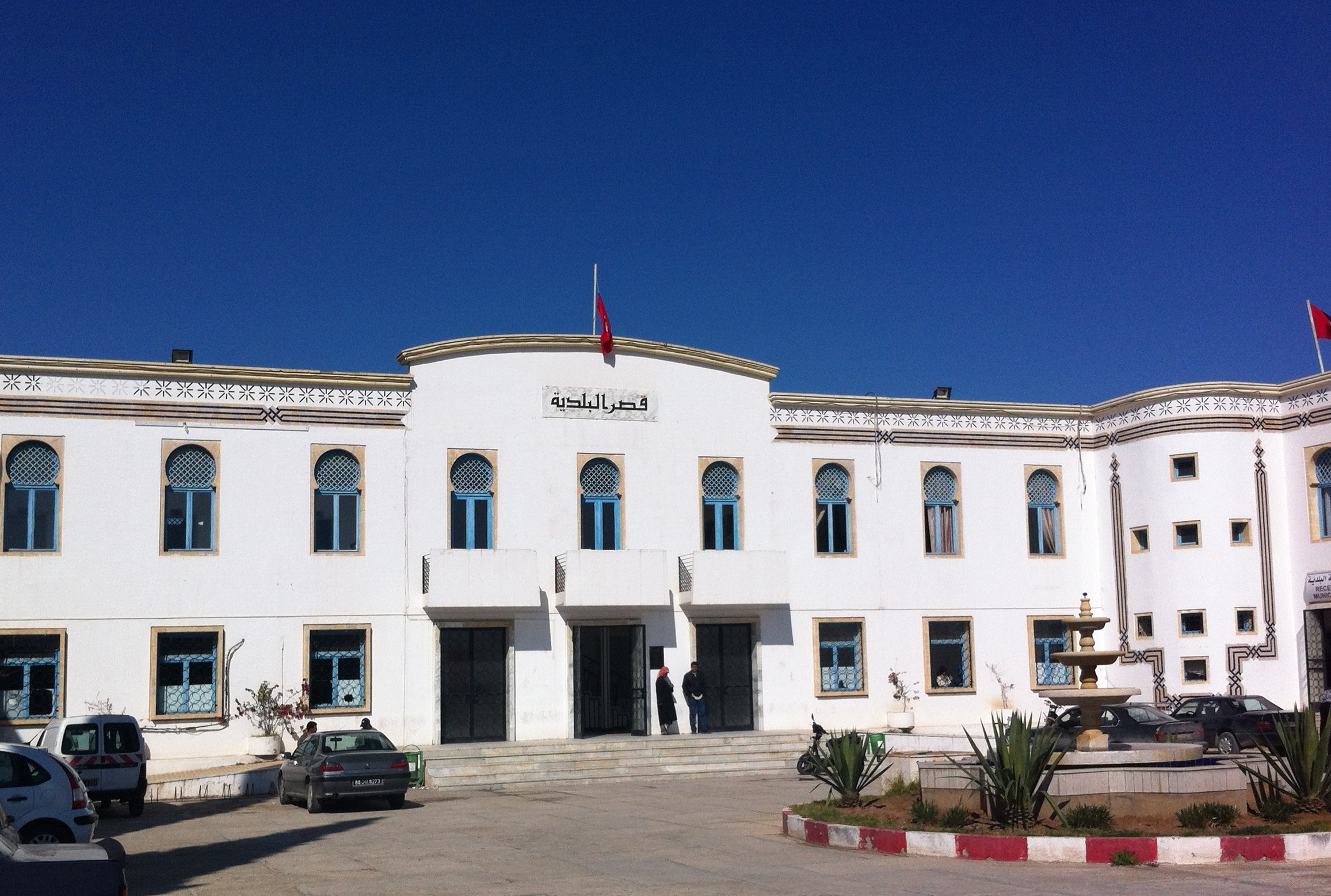

== Administrative divisions ==
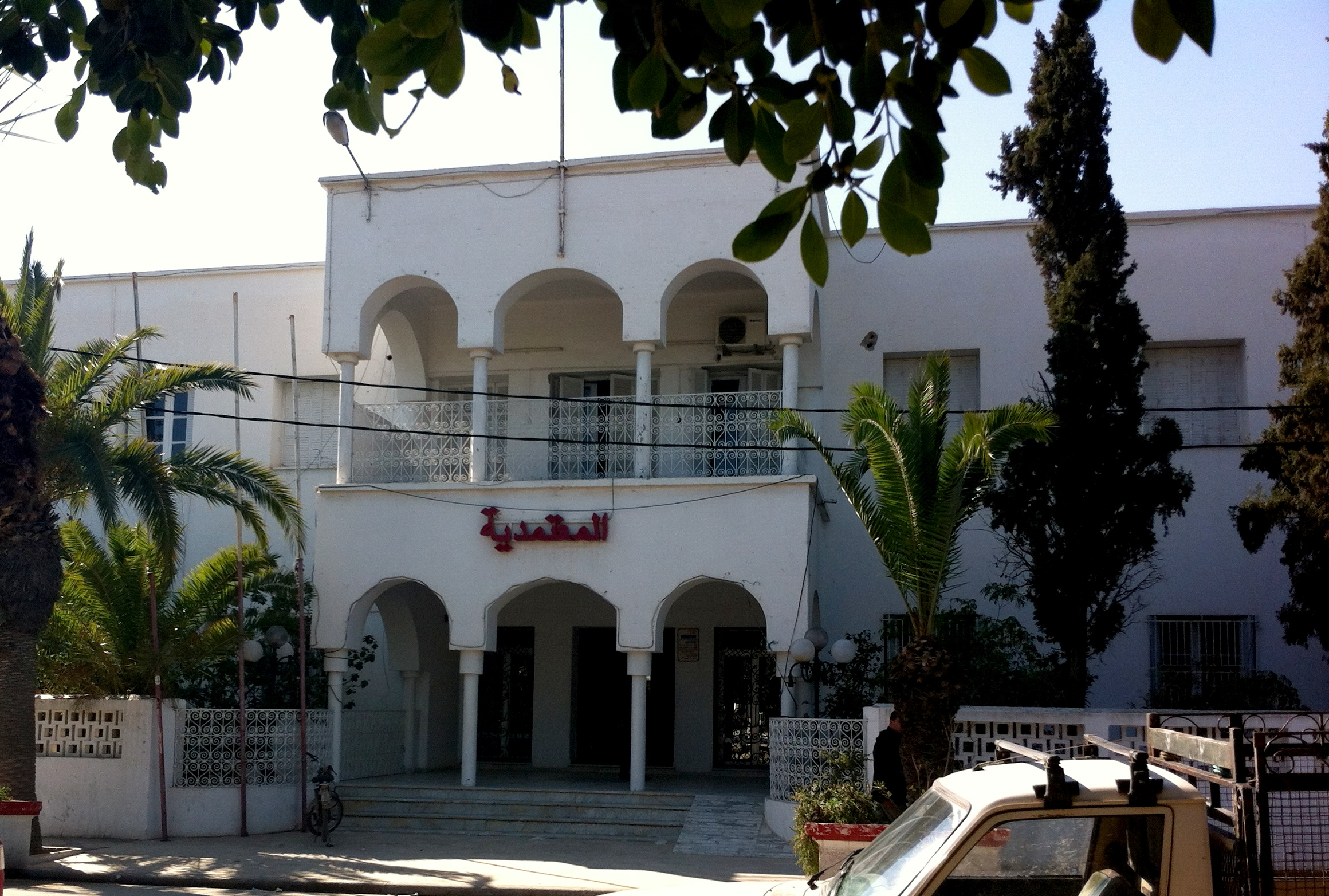
Msaken delegation

The following villages and Towns are part of M'saken delegation

Village/Town	Distance to M'saken(Km)	Population (2014)	Municipality
Borjine	7	3,966	M'saken
Beni Rabiâa	6	3,528	M'saken
Beni Kalthoum	2	2,453	M'saken
Knaies	8	4,780	M'saken
Frada	26	1,434	M'saken
Moureddine	7	3,614	M'saken
Messaadine	2	12,930	Messaadine

== History ==
According to local tradition, M'saken was founded by a group of descendants of Husayn Ibn Ali, grandson of Muhammad. They had come to North Africa escaping from the Abbasid rulers of Baghdad, who had been engaged in a cruel fight against Sharifians (descendants of Husayn and his brother Hassan) the sons of Ali.

They founded a Sharifian Emirate in near present-day Tiaret in west-central Algeria. After three generations, following the fall of this Emirate, some of their descendants lived in eastern Morocco near Oujda for some time, before moving to Kairouan in Tunisia. After some decades, they founded the town of M'saken at the time of the Hafsid dynasty which was based in Tunis.

Their town was originally called 'Kousour al Ashraf' (which means "Sharif's houses"), then 'Masakin al Ashraf' (which has the same meaning), and finally Masakin - or 'Msaken' as it is pronounced and spelled in North Africa. The town centre was built around the Jamma al Awsat (which means the central mosque) and was composed of five ksars (great houses).

== Culture ==
Traditional houses of M'saken have typical traditional doors which are also found in the neighbour villages and towns (Zaouiet Sousse, Ouerdanine, Beni Kalthoum, fr:Borjine, Moureddine ...).The door can be double or with single leaf, and has always a small leaf inside called Khoukha (lit. pear).

Traditional doors of M'saken

Traditional dresses of M'saken as typical of North Africa and more specifically of the Tunisian Sahel region. The Melya, traditional dress of women in North Africa, was used in M'saken but today it is no longer used. In Tunisia, each village or region uses a specific color for its women Houli (Melya). According to old people it had the color gold for M'saken women.

=== Sufism ===
M'saken is known to be a religious city. It included the Madrasa of Sidi Ali ben Khalifa and over the centuries has been home to a number of Sufi figures:

- Sheikh Mohamed Gazzah
- Sheikh Ladharai
- Sidi Omar Shatti
- Sidi Ali Ben Khalifa

== Historic monuments ==
The Awsat Mosque of M'saken is among the oldest known monuments of M'saken city. It was founded around the year 1360.

The towns has five main historical palaces:

- Ksar El Nejejra
- Ksar El Menaama
- Ksar El Jabliyine
- Ksar El Qebliyine
- Ksar El Jedidiyine

== Dialect ==
M'saken locals speak the Msakni dialect, which is a branch of the Sahel dialect, specific to the Sahel, Tunisia region, and which is a Pre-Hilalian_Arabic_dialect and a citadin pre hilalian language The most characteristic word being the pronoun of the first person singular pronounced 'eni' in the Sahel instead of 'ena': In M'saken it is said 'yeni' by replacing the vowel 'e' by 'y' M'saken dialect is also recognisable by the strong vowel 'i' at the end of many words (nouns and verbs ) which are pronounced at the end with a soft 'i' in the rest of the Sahel and as 'e' or 'a' in the rest of Tunisia and North Africa.

- Examples:
- He went: Mshi (M'saken), Mshei (rest of Sahel), Mshe (Tunis), Msha (Central and west Algeria)
- He ate : Kli (M'saken), Klei (rest ofSahel), Kle(Tunis), Kla (Central and west Algeria)
- Water: Mi (M'saken), Mei (rest of Sahel), Me(Tunis), Ma (Central and West Algeria)
- Here: Hni (M'saken), Hnei(Rest of Sahel), Hne or Houni(Tunis), Hna (Central and West Algeria)

== Migrations ==
M'saken has a large population living in foreign countries, mainly in France and more particularly in the Côte d'Azur region, in Nice and neighbouring areas. According to some sources, 40% of the population of M'saken lives outside Tunisia. The town's population increases very significantly in July and August every year following the return of migrants to their hometown for the holidays.

== DNA Haplogroup ==
Recent genetic studies of the Msaken population suggest a significant historical connection to West Asia. It is believed that the city was founded around 1360 AD by five related men who migrated from this region, and subsequent population growth included descendants of the founders as well as migrants from other parts of Tunisia. A Y-DNA analysis of 23 males from different Msaken families was conducted, using both Short Tandem Repeats (STR) and Single Nucleotide Polymorphisms (SNP) markers. The study revealed that most of the tested individuals belonged to the Haplogroup J-M172, specifically the J-L271 subgroup. two individuals belonging to Kermous tribe were found belonging to Haplogroup Haplogroup R1a AND MORE PRECISELY R-Z93 The analysis estimated the Time to Most Recent Common Ancestor Most recent common ancestor (TMRCA) for the population to be between 1500 and 6200 years before present, with a notable genetic bottleneck around 5400 years ago. The geographic origin of this haplogroup is traced to East Anatolia, present-day Armenia, Azerbaijan, and western Iran. Interestingly, 20-30% of random Tunisian STR haplotypes also exhibit the Msaken-Haplotype, linking the population's Y-DNA to broader regional genetic patterns (source).

For more information, see the published study by Kamel AL-Gazzah, Technical Director and Citizen Scientist, Tunisia (DOI: 10.61797/ijbic.v3i1.292).

== Climate ==
The Köppen climate classification classifies M'saken climate as hot semi-arid (BSh) bordering with hot-summer Mediterranean (Csa).

The climate of the region is considered to be a local steppe climate. There is a little rainfall throughout the year. The average annual temperature is 18.3°C. In a year, the average rainfall is 347 mm.

== Sports ==
M'saken has several sport clubs, including:

- Football / Handball: Croissant Sportif de M'saken founded in 1945.
- Rugby: Avenir sportif de M'saken founded in 1991.

== Notable people ==
- Habib Chatti, Politician, diplomat
- Karim Krifa, Politician.
- Zied Ladhari, Politician.
- Zoubeir Baya, Football player
- Saïf Ghezal, Football player.
- Ridha Layouni: President of Association of National Olympic Academies of Africa (AANOA) and Former Tunisian National Olympic Committee.
- Brahim Babaï, Producer.
- Jalila Hafsia, Journalist, Writer.
- Chedly Anouar, Musician.
- Mohamed Bellalouna, Politician.
- Mohamed Lahouaiej-Bouhlel (1985-2016), perpetrator of the 2016 Nice truck attack.
- Souad Lyagoubi, physician, academic, diplomat and politician

== See also ==
- List of cities in Tunisia
- Haplogroup J-M172
- Sousse Governorate
- Sahel, Tunisia
