= Sahali =

- Location in Tunisia
- Coordinates: 35°45′49″N 10°17′20″E
- Country: Tunisia
- Time zone: UTC1 (CET)

Sahali (Arabic: ساحلي) (As Sahili) is a town in eastern Tunisia. It is located at around 35°46′N 10°17′E.
