= Kalâa Seghira =

Coordinates: 35°49′25″N 10°33′30″E

Kalaa Sghira
- Commune and town
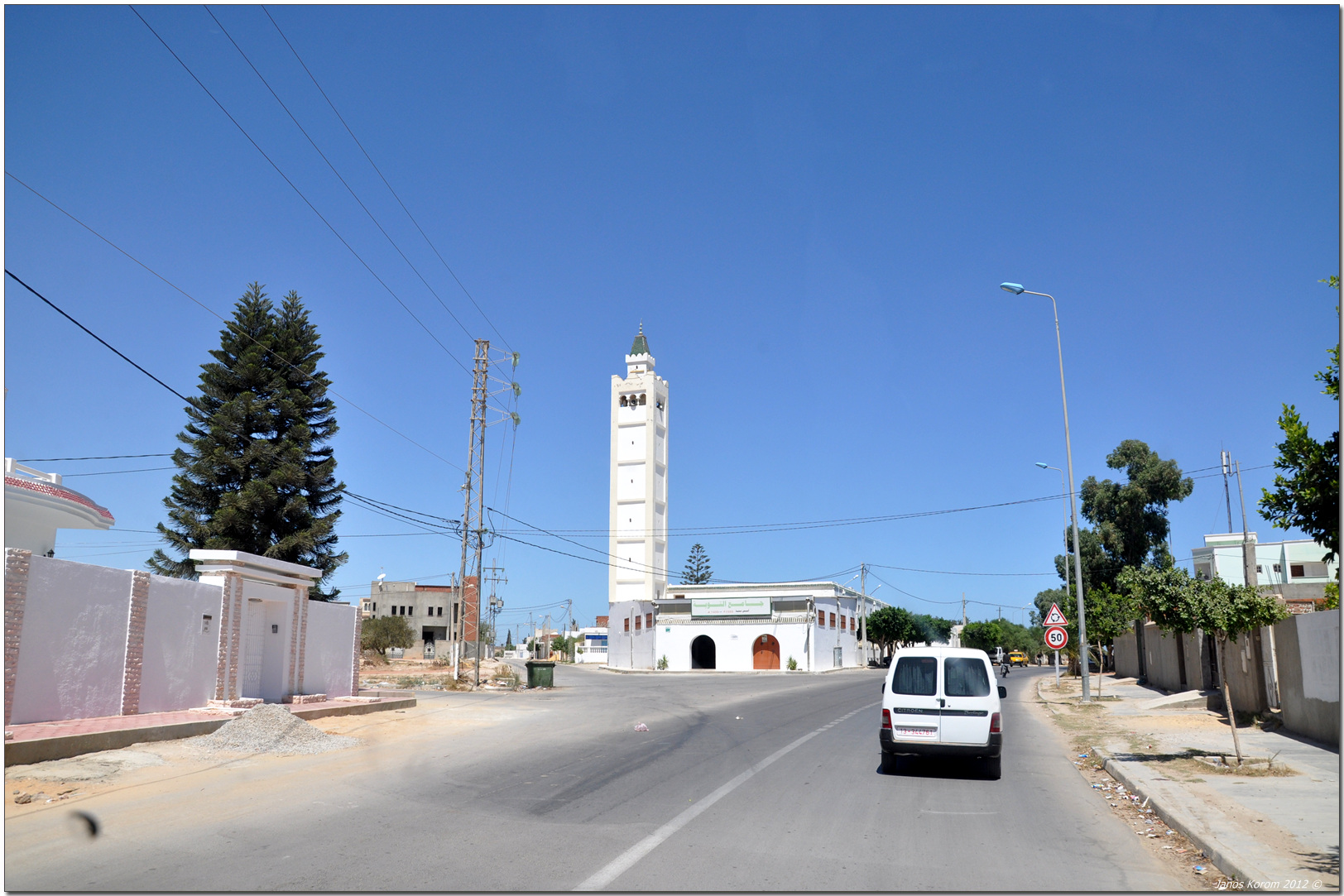
- Kalaa Sghira Road.
- Interactive map of Kalaa Sghira
- Country: Tunisia
- Governorate: Sousse Governorate
- Delegation(s): Kalaa Sghira

Government
  - Mayor: Samiha Bouraoui (Ennahda)

Population (2022)
  - Total: 44,220
- Time zone: UTC+1 (CET)

Kalaa Sghira is a town and commune in the Sousse Governorate, Tunisia. As of 2004 it had a population of 25,078.

== Notable people ==
- Mohamed Hedi El Amri (1906–1978) was a Tunisian historian and writer.

== See also ==
- List of cities in Tunisia
