= Kalâa Kebira =

Coordinates: 35°52′N 10°32′E

Kalâa Kebira القلعة الكبرى
- Commune and town
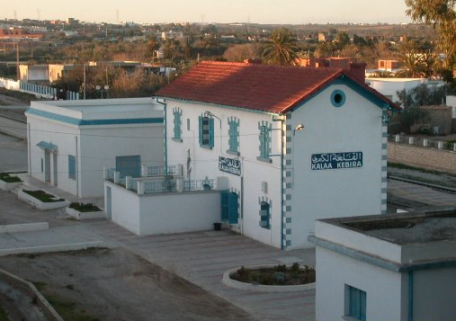
- Interactive map of Kalâa Kebira
- Country: Tunisia
- Governorate: Sousse Governorate
- Delegation(s): Kalâa Kebira

Government
  - Mayor: Salem Ouerjini (Ennahda)

Population (2022)
  - Total: 63,264
- Time zone: UTC+1 (CET)
- Postal code: 4060

Kalâa Kebira is a town and commune in the Sousse Governorate, Tunisia. As of 2004 it had a population of 45,990.

Kalâa Kebira was used as the host of the 2012 UNAF U-17 Tournament.

== History ==
During the Roman Empire it was the site of a civitas (town) of the Roman province of Byzacena called Gurza. Gurza was also the seat of an ancient episcopal see of the Roman Catholic Church, survives as a titular bishopric.

It was in the reign of the Aghlabid dynasty that the nucleus of the city was founded, in the place known as El Ksar, which consists of a very small city surrounded by a very high rampart with a door Unique on the eastern face leading to the market place.

The commune was created on 19 February 1921.

== Economy ==
The town is renowned for its olive groves, from which it derives its nickname of "capital of the olives". The economy of Kalâa Kebira therefore relies mainly on agriculture.

The industrial sector is therefore focused on the agro-food industry (olive oil). However, the industrial zone, which already extends over 34 hectares2 and which is constantly developing to the north-east of the city, also houses export-oriented activities such as the textile and clothing industry but also Pharmaceutical industry, with the presence of UNIMED3 laboratories.

== See also ==
- List of cities in Tunisia
