= Souad Lyagoubi =

Tunisian physician, academic, diplomat and politician

- سعاد اليعقوبي

Minister of Public Health of Tunisia
- In office 1983–1988

Personal details
- Born: Souad Lyagoubi-Ouahchi; October 9, 1938 M'Saken, Tunisia
- Occupation: Physician, academic, diplomat, politician

Souad Lyagoubi (also Souad Lyagoubi-Ouahchi; born 9 October 1938) is a Tunisian physician, academic, diplomat and politician. She was appointed Minister of Public Health of Tunisia in 1983 and remained in office until 1988. Before entering government, she was a founding figure of the Faculty of Medicine of Sousse, where she served as dean. She later served as Tunisia's ambassador and permanent representative in Geneva and held senior positions at the World Health Organization (WHO). Her name has also been transliterated as Souad Yacoubi and Souad Yaacoubi Ouachy.

== Early life and education ==
Souad Lyagoubi-Ouahchi was born on 9 October 1938 in M'saken, Tunisia. She studied medicine at the University of Marseille, where she specialized in electroencephalography and neuropsychiatry.

== Medical and academic career ==
Before returning to Tunisia, Lyagoubi-Ouahchi worked in Marseille as a physician at the Saint-Paul center for epileptic children from 1969 to 1970, at a Marseille hospital from 1968 to 1972, and at the Saint-Roch psychiatric clinic in 1972.

She was part of the founding nucleus of the Faculty of Medicine of Sousse in 1974. She served as dean of the faculty from 1974 to 1983 and became professor of physiology in 1981.

The Faculty of Medicine of Sousse later named an amphitheatre after her.

== Minister of Public Health ==
Lyagoubi-Ouahchi was appointed Minister of Public Health of Tunisia in 1983 and remained in office until 1988.

In 1984, she participated in the session of the WHO Regional Committee for the Eastern Mediterranean in Tunis as Tunisia's Minister of Health.

== Diplomatic and international career ==
By 1989, Lyagoubi-Ouahchi was serving as Tunisia's ambassador and permanent representative in Geneva, a post she held until 1991.

In 1991, she was appointed General Chairman of the Technical Discussions at the 45th World Health Assembly, a role she held at the 1992 Assembly.

By 1998, she was serving in the WHO leadership team with responsibility for external affairs and governing bodies. In 2000, she was listed as WHO's Executive Director for External Relations and Governing Bodies.

== Honours and recognition ==
In 1988, Lyagoubi-Ouahchi was elected a foreign corresponding member of the French National Academy of Medicine in the biological sciences division.
