= Sousse Governorate =

Governorate of Tunisia

Sousse ولاية سوسة
- Governorate
- Flag

- Map of Tunisia with Sousse highlighted

- Subdivisions of Sousse Governorate
- Coordinates: 35°50′N 10°38′E
- Country: Tunisia
- Created: 21 June 1956
- Capital: Sousse

Government
  - Governor: Sofiane Tanfouri (since 2024)

Area
  - Total: 2,669 km^{2} (1,031 sq mi)
  - Rank: Ranked 19th of 24

Population (2024)
  - Total: 762,281
  - Rank: Ranked 4th of 24
  - Density: 285.6/km^{2} (739.7/sq mi)
- Time zone: UTC+01 (CET)
- Postal prefix: xx
- ISO 3166 code: TN-51

Sousse Governorate (Arabic: ولاية سوسة Wilāyat Sūsah pronounced [ˈsuː.sə]; French: Gouvernorat de Sousse) is one of the 24 governorates of Tunisia. It is beside the eastern coast of Tunisia in the north-east of the country and covers an area of 2,621 km^{2} and has a population of 762,281 (2024 census). The capital is Sousse. The governorate of Sousse is Tunisia's second largest tourist destination, boasting 115 hotels with a capacity of 40,000 beds spread across the Sousse-Jawhara, Sousse-Medina, Sousse-Nord, and Sousse-Sud regions. Two new tourist areas are currently being developed in Hergla and Bouficha. They will have a capacity of over 20,000 beds.

== Geography ==
The area compasses most of the broad eastern coastal plain (which has a hot Mediterranean climate) featuring salt and fresh water lakes, fed by winter rains. A narrow strip of forest, the Foret Nationale de Tunisie, adjoins part of the beach swathe between Sousse and Hammamet to the far north, the beach forming most of the coastline. These cities are on the Gulf of Hammamet which is a gently curved bay. The largest lake is the Sebkhet de Sidi El Hani which is shared with two other areas but is mostly in the Sousse Governorate.

Elevations are pronounced in the second national park in the area, which is mainly in Nabeul Governorate, is on all of the seaward sides of Hammam Bent Djadidi adjoining the northern border.

=== Transport ===
Linked by the widest road in the country and railways to Tunis, the area has roads and railways leading further into the country and towards Libya as well as an airport beside the main port city of Sousse, Monastir Habib Bourguiba International Airport which is beyond its short eastern border in much smaller Monastir Governorate. There is a Metro line that goes from Sousse Beb Djedid through Monastir to Mahdia.

== Administrative divisions ==
The governorate is divided into sixteen delegations (mutamadiyat), listed below with their populations at the 2004 and 2014 Censuses:

Delegation	Area in km^{2}	Pop'n 2004 Census	Pop'n 2014 Census
Akouda	44.6	25,717	34,494
Bouficha	261.8	23,581	26,760
Enfidha	369.8	43,426	49,335
Hammam Sousse	18.5	34,685	42,691
Hergla	84.4	7,913	9,343
Kalâa Kebira	232.9	51,196	59,132
Kalâa Seghira	102.9	27,726	37,797
Kondar	173.7	11,636	13,565
M'saken	332.5	85,380	97,225
Sidi Bou Ali	128.7	17,606	19,543
Sidi El Hani	318.7	11,614	13,505
Sousse Jawhara	14.3	62,663	86,517
Sousse Médina	6.3	29,680	35,288
Sousse Riadh	10.1	....	64,532
Sousse Sidi Abdelhamid	12.3	46,257	52,787
Zaouia-Ksiba-Thrayet	36.5	....	32,304

Sixteen municipalities are in Sousse Governorate:

3111	Sousse	240,321
3112	Ksibet Thrayet	15,497
3113	Ezzouhour	18,589
3114	Zaouiet Sousse	33,633
3115	Hammam Sousse	48,899
3116	Akouda	30,568
3117	Kalâa Kebira	67,108
3118	Sidi Bou Ali	20,647
3119	Hergla	10,652
3120	Enfidha	35,246
3121	Bouficha	36,094
3122	Sidi El Hani	14,508
3123	M'saken	82,429
3124	Kalâa Seghira	45,743
3125	Messaadine	14,883
3126	Kondar	15,491
	Chott Meriem	8,606
	Grimet - Hicher	23,367

== Governors ==
Governors of Sousse since the independence:

- Mohamed Makni (21 June 1956-1 October 1957)
- Abelhamid El Kadhi (1 October 1957-1 September 1962)
- Amor Chachia (1 September 1962-8 September 1969)
- Abdessalem Ghédira (8 September 1969-27 August 1970)
- Ahmed Bellalouna (27 August 1970-7 September 1972)
- Mohamed Ennaceur (7 September 1972-8 June 1973)
- Ahmed Bennour (8 June 1973-5 March 1974)
- Mansour Skhiri (5 March 1974-10 March 1977)
- Nouredine Fennich (10 March 1977-22 April 1980)
- Hamadi Khouini (22 April 1980-16 March 1983)
- Kantaoui Morjane (16 March 1983-26 July 1986)
- Brahim Jameleddine (26 July 1986-1 April 1988)
- Habib Daldoul (1 April 1988-25 October 1990)
- Rafaâ Dekhil (25 October 1990-5 August 1991)
- Abdelbaki Bacha (5 August 1991-10 October 1992)
- Amor N'sairi (10 October 1992-22 July 1996)
- Mabrouk Bahri (22 July 1996-3 February 1997)
- Mohamed Soudani (3 February 1997-6 July 1998)
- Abderahmen Limam (6 July 1998-12 July 2006)
- Taïeb Ragoubi (12 July 2006-2 February 2011)
- Khemaïes Argoubi (2-19 February 2011)
- Fawzi Jaoui (19 February 2011-27 August 2012)
- Mokhles Jemal (27 August 2012-28 February 2014)
- Abdelmalak Sellami (28 February 2014-4 July 2015)
- Fethi Bdira (4 July 2015-18 May 2017)
- Adel Chlioui (18 May 2017-14 April 2020)
- Raja Trabelsi (14 April 2020-29 March 2022)
- Nabil Ferjani (6 June 2022-8 September 2024)
- Sofiane Tanfouri (Since 8 September 2024)
