= Delegations of Tunisia =

Second-level administrative divisions of Tunisia

The delegations of Tunisia (Arabic: معتمدية, romanized: muʿtamadiyya, plural معتمديات muʿtamadiyyāt) are the second level administrative divisions of Tunisia between the governorates and the sectors (imadats). As of 2024 there were 24 governorates which were divided into 272 delegations and further divided into 2073 sectors. The delegations are listed below, organized by governorate.

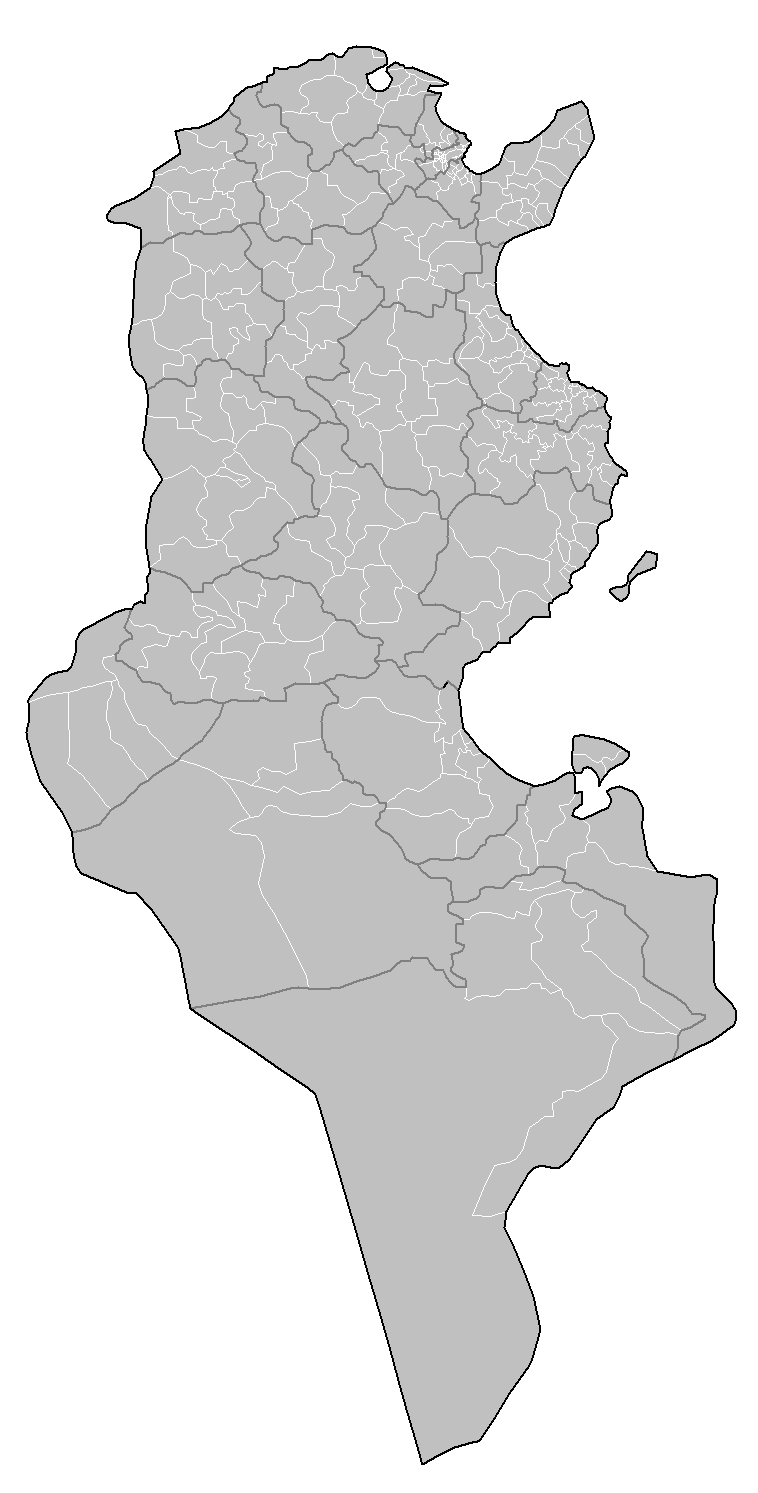
Delegations of Tunisia

== Ariana ==
Delegations of Ariana:

- Ariana Ville
- Cité Ettadhamen
- Kalâat El Andalous
- La Soukra
- Mnihla
- Raoued
- Sidi Thabet

== Béja ==
Delegations of Béja:

- Amdoun
- Béja Nord
- Béja Sud
- Goubellat
- Medjez El Bab
- Nefza
- Téboursouk
- Testour
- Thibar

== Ben Arous ==
Delegations of Ben Arous:

- Ben Arous
- Bou Mhel El Bassatine
- El Mourouj
- Ezzahra
- Fouchana
- Hammam Chott
- Hammam Lif
- Medina Jedida
- Mégrine
- Mohamedia
- Mornag
- Radès

== Bizerte ==
Delegations of Bizerte:

- Bizerte Nord
- Bizerte Sud
- El Alia
- Ghar El Melh
- Ghezala
- Joumine
- Mateur
- Menzel Bourguiba
- Menzel Jemil
- Ras Jebel
- Sejnane
- Tinja
- Utique
- Zarzouna

== Gabès ==
Delegations of Gabès:

- Dkhilet Toujane
- El Hamma
- Gabès Médina
- Gabès Ouest
- Gabès Sud
- Ghannouch
- Habib Thameur Bouatouch
- Mareth
- Matmata
- Menzel El Habib
- Métouia
- Nouvelle Matmata
- Oudhref

== Gafsa ==
Delegations of Gafsa:

- Belkhir
- El Guettar
- El Ksar
- Gafsa Nord
- Gafsa Sud
- Mdhila
- Métlaoui
- Moularès
- Redeyef
- Sened
- Sidi Aïch
- Sidi Boubaker
- Zannouch

== Jendouba ==
Delegations of Jendouba:

- Aïn Draham
- Balta - Bou Aouane
- Bou Salem
- Fernana
- Ghardimaou
- Jendouba
- Jendouba Nord
- Oued Meliz
- Tabarka

== Kairouan ==
Delegations of Kairouan:

- Aïn Djeloula
- Bou Hajla
- Chebika
- Echrarda
- El Alâa
- Haffouz
- Hajeb el Ayoun
- Kairouan Nord
- Kairouan Sud
- Menzel Mehiri
- Nasrallah
- Oueslatia
- Sbikha

== Kasserine ==
Delegations of Kasserine:

- El Ayoun
- Ezzouhour
- Fériana
- Foussana
- Haïdra
- Hassi El Ferid
- Jedelienne
- Kasserine Nord
- Kasserine Sud
- Majel Bel Abbès
- Sbeïtla
- Sbiba
- Thala

== Kébili ==
Delegations of Kebili:

- Douz Nord
- Douz Sud
- Faouar
- Kébili Nord
- Kébili Sud
- Rjim Maatoug
- Souk Lahad

== Kef ==
Delegations of Kef:

- Dahmani
- El Ksour
- Jérissa
- Kalâat Khasba
- Kalaat Senan
- Kef Est
- Kef Ouest
- Nebeur
- Sakiet Sidi Youssef
- Sers
- Tajerouine
- Touiref

== Mahdia ==
Delegations of Mahdia:

- Bou Merdes
- Chebba
- Chorbane
- El Bradâa
- El Jem
- Essouassi
- Hebira
- Ksour Essef
- Mahdia
- Melloulèche
- Ouled Chamekh
- Rejiche
- Sidi Alouane

== Manouba ==
Delegations of Manouba:

- Borj El Amri
- Djedeida
- Douar Hicher
- El Batan
- Manouba
- Mornaguia
- Oued Ellil
- Tebourba

== Médenine ==
Delegations of Medenine:

- Ben Gardane
- Beni Khedache
- Djerba Ajim
- Djerba Houmt Souk
- Djerba Midoun
- Médenine Nord
- Médenine Sud
- Sidi Makhlouf
- Zarzis

== Monastir ==
Delegations of Monastir:

- Bekalta
- Bembla
- Beni Hassen
- Jemmal
- Ksar Hellal
- Ksibet El Médiouni
- Moknine
- Monastir
- Ouerdanine
- Sahline
- Sayada - Lamta - Bouhjar
- Téboulba
- Zéramdine

== Nabeul ==
Delegations of Nabeul:

- Béni Khalled
- Béni Khiar
- Bou Argoub
- Dar Châabane El Fehri
- El Haouaria
- El Mida
- Grombalia
- Hammamet
- Hammam Ghezèze
- Kélibia
- Korba
- Menzel Bouzelfa
- Menzel Temime
- Nabeul
- Soliman
- Takelsa

== Sfax ==
Delegations of Sfax:

- Agareb
- Bir Ali Ben Khalifa
- El Amra
- El Hencha
- Graïba
- Jebiniana
- Kerkennah
- Mahrès
- Menzel Chaker
- Sakiet Eddaïer
- Sakiet Ezzit
- Sfax Ouest
- Sfax Sud
- Sfax Ville
- Skhira
- Thyna

== Sidi Bouzid ==
Delegations of Sidi Bouzid:

- Bir El Hafey
- Cebbala Ouled Asker
- El Hichria
- Essaïda
- Jilma
- Meknassy
- Menzel Bouzaiane
- Mezzouna
- Ouled Haffouz
- Regueb
- Sidi Ali Ben Aoun
- Sidi Bouzid Est
- Sidi Bouzid Ouest
- Souk Jedid

== Siliana ==
Delegations of Siliana:

- Bargou
- Bou Arada
- El Aroussa
- El Krib
- Gaâfour
- Kesra
- Makthar
- Rouhia
- Sidi Bou Rouis
- Siliana Nord
- Siliana Sud

== Sousse ==
Delegations of Sousse:

- Akouda
- Bouficha
- Enfida
- Hammam Sousse
- Hergla
- Kalâa Kebira
- Kalâa Seghira
- Kondar
- M'saken
- Sidi Bou Ali
- Sidi El Hani
- Sousse Jawhara
- Sousse Médina
- Sousse Riadh
- Sousse Sidi Abdelhamid
- Zaouiet - Ksibet Thrayet

== Tataouine ==
Delegations of Tataouine:

- Beni Mehira
- Bir Lahmar
- Dehiba
- Ghomrassen
- Remada
- Smâr
- Tataouine Nord
- Tataouine Sud

== Tozeur ==
Delegations of Tozeur:

- Degache
- El Hamma du Jérid
- Hazoua
- Nefta
- Tamerza
- Tozeur

== Tunis ==
Delegations of Tunis:

- Bab El Bhar
- Bab Souika
- Carthage
- Cité El Khadra
- Djebel Jelloud
- El Hraïria
- El Kabaria
- El Menzah
- El Omrane
- El Omrane Supérieur
- El Ouardia
- Ettahrir
- Ezzouhour
- La Goulette
- La Marsa
- Le Bardo
- Le Kram
- Medina
- Séjoumi
- Sidi El Béchir
- Sidi Hassine

== Zaghouan ==
Delegations of Zaghouan:

- Bir Mcherga
- El Fahs
- Nadhour
- Saouaf
- Zaghouan
- Zriba

The delegations are further subdivided into municipalities (shaykhats).

== See also ==
- Governorates of Tunisia
