= Evolution of Textile Monument (Ksar Hellal) =

- نصب صناعة النسيج بقصر هلال (Arabic)
- حمامة
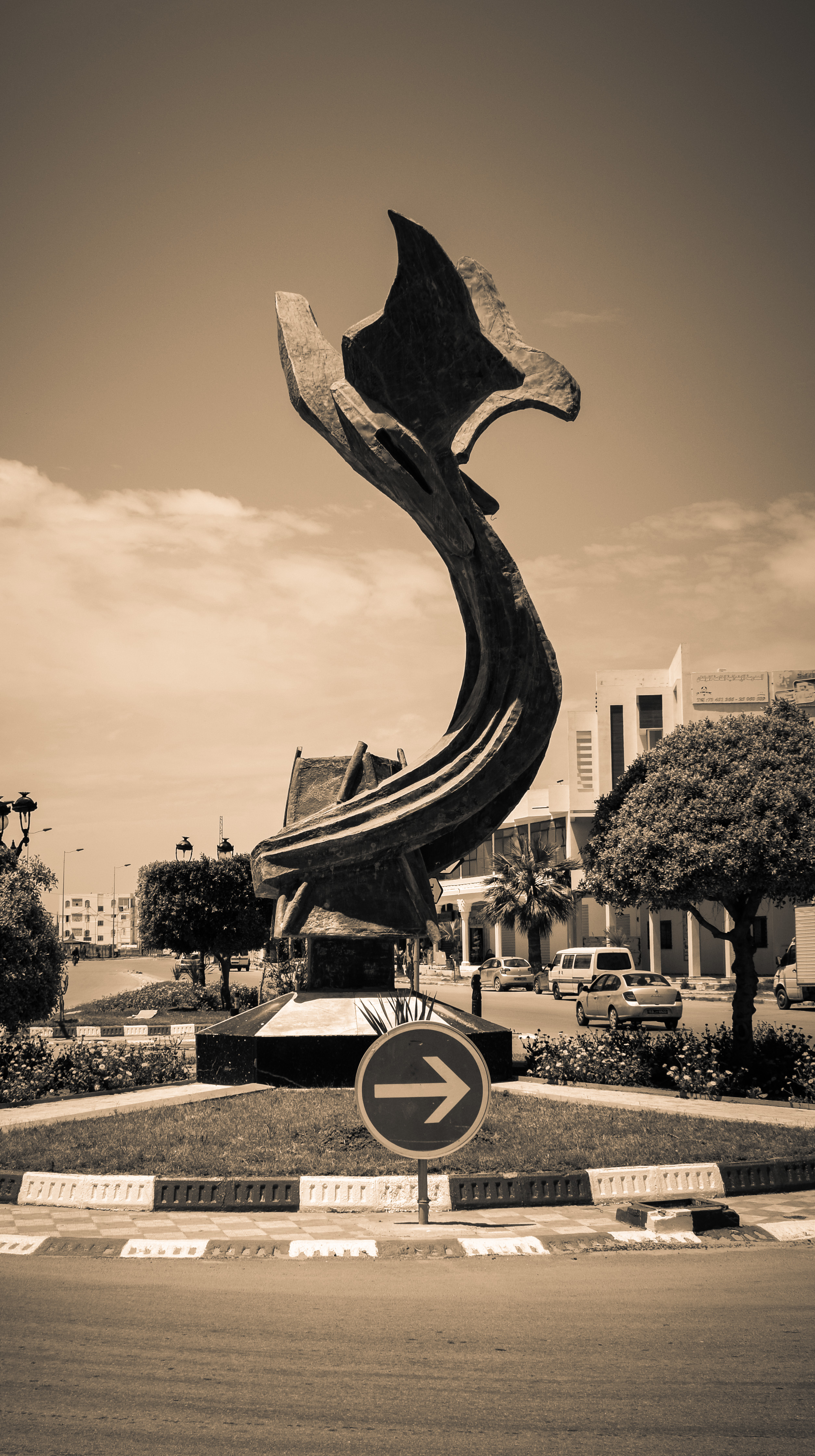
- The Evolution of Textile Monument, front view.

- Location within Tunisia
- 35°39′10″N 10°52′51″E
- Type: Monumental sculpture
- Location: Ksar Hellal, Tunisia

History
- Built: 1997

Site notes
- Height: 11 metres (36 ft)
- Sculptor: Abdelfattah Boussetta

The Evolution of Textile Monument (Arabic: نصب صناعة النسيج بقصر هلال), is a monument located in the center of the city of Ksar Hellal (Tunisia). The monument is a symbol of the development of the textile industry in Ksar Hellal, the city is dubbed "the textile capital of Tunisia".

The monument was designed and executed by the Tunisian sculptor Abdelfattah Boussetta in 1997. The monument is also known by the name Hmmama (Arabic: حمامة) which means ‘dove’ in English, due to the dove at the top of the monument, through which the sculptor wanted to represent the initial motion (development and ambition) and the creativity of the city in the textile industry sector.

Used materials: Copper, Bronze and Steel.

== Gallery ==
The Monument seen from different angles

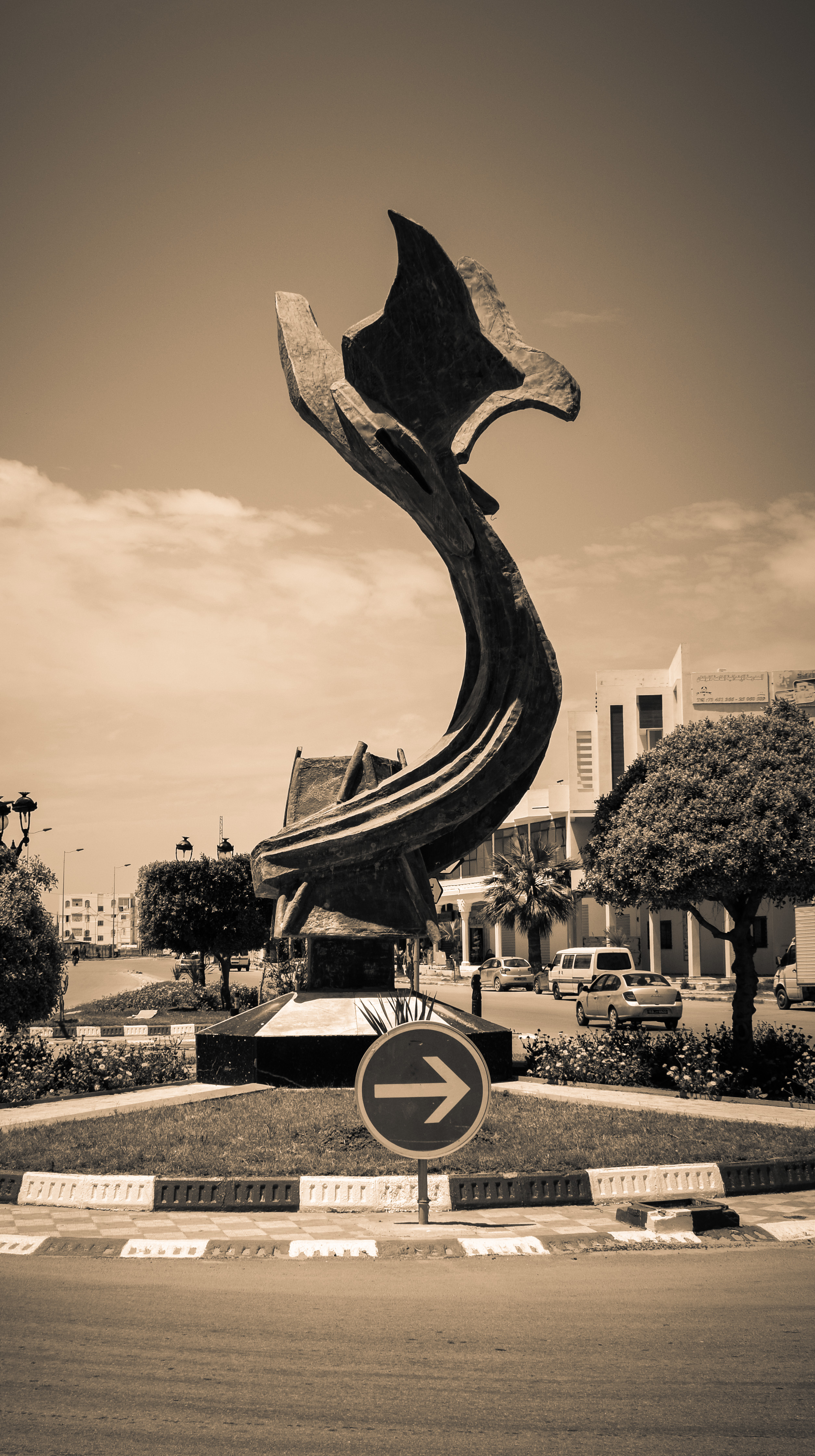
the Evolution of Textile Monument, Front view.

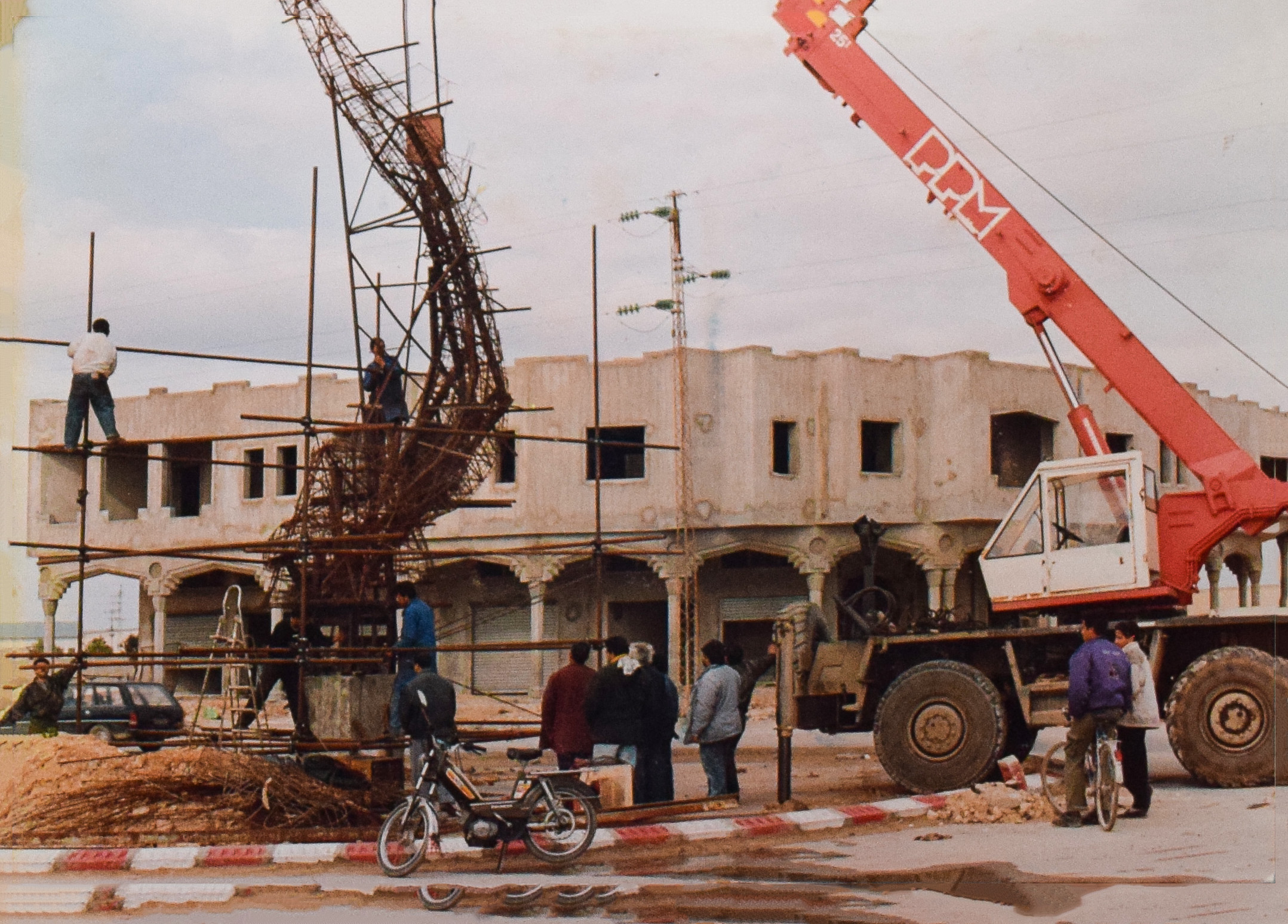
the Evolution of Textile Monument during the construction, carried by the sculptor Abdelfattah Boussetta in 1997.

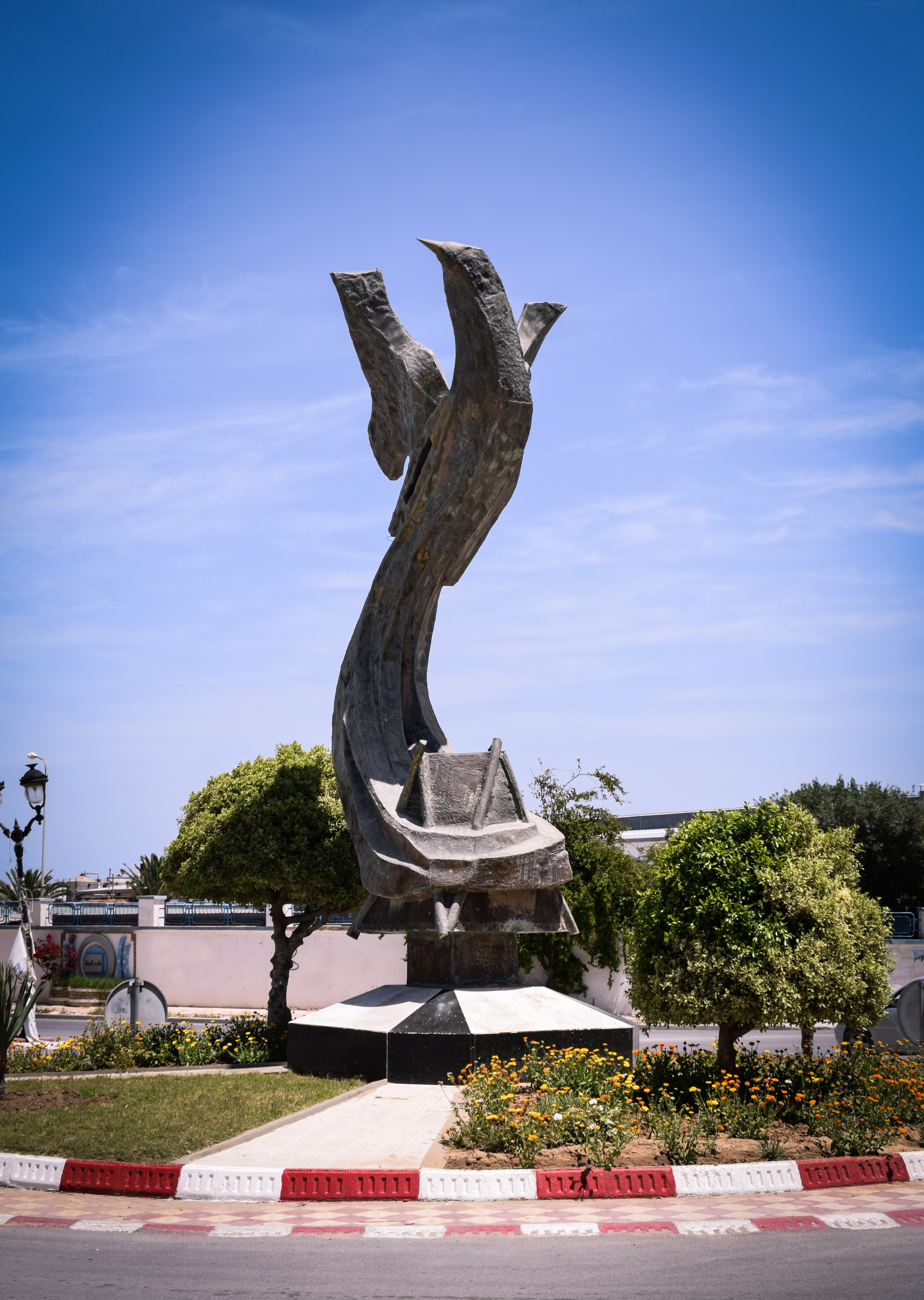
the Evolution of Textile Monument, Side view.
