= Ksour Essef cuirass =

Ancient Greek cuirass at the Bardo National Museum

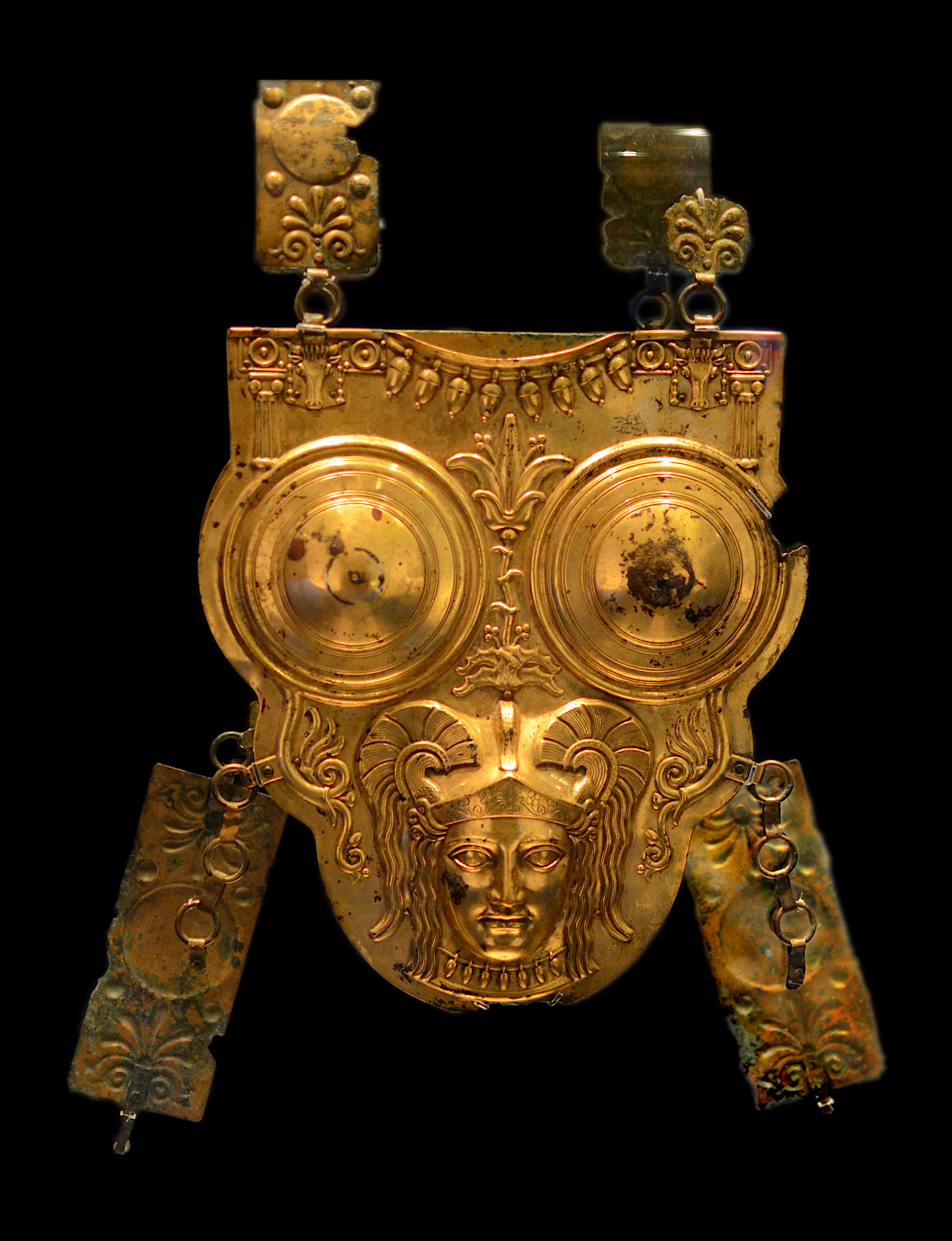
- Cuirass breastplate
- Material: Gilded bronze
- Created: Late 4th century BC - early 3rd century BC ?
- Discovered: 20 February 1909; Ksour Essef
- Present location: Bardo National Museum
- Culture: Italiote

The Ksour Essef cuirass is an ancient triple-disc cuirass found in a Punic tomb in 1909 not far from Ksour Essef, Tunisia.

This piece of armour is of Italiote origin and comes from Southern Italy. Traditionally, its discovery in Tunisia led researchers to link it to the expeditions of the Second Punic War led in Italy by the Carthaginian general Hannibal between 211 and 203 BC and, as a result, the piece is broadly dated to the 3rd century BC. This hypothesis, although tempting, is now widely questioned following in-depth examination of the various objects found in the tomb, which seem to rather suggest a date in the second half of the 4th century BC or, at least, before the First Punic War.

The cuirass is nowadays kept in the Bardo National Museum in Tunis, as is the archaeological material found in the same tomb. It is still, a century after its discovery, one of the emblematic pieces of its ancient department.

== History ==
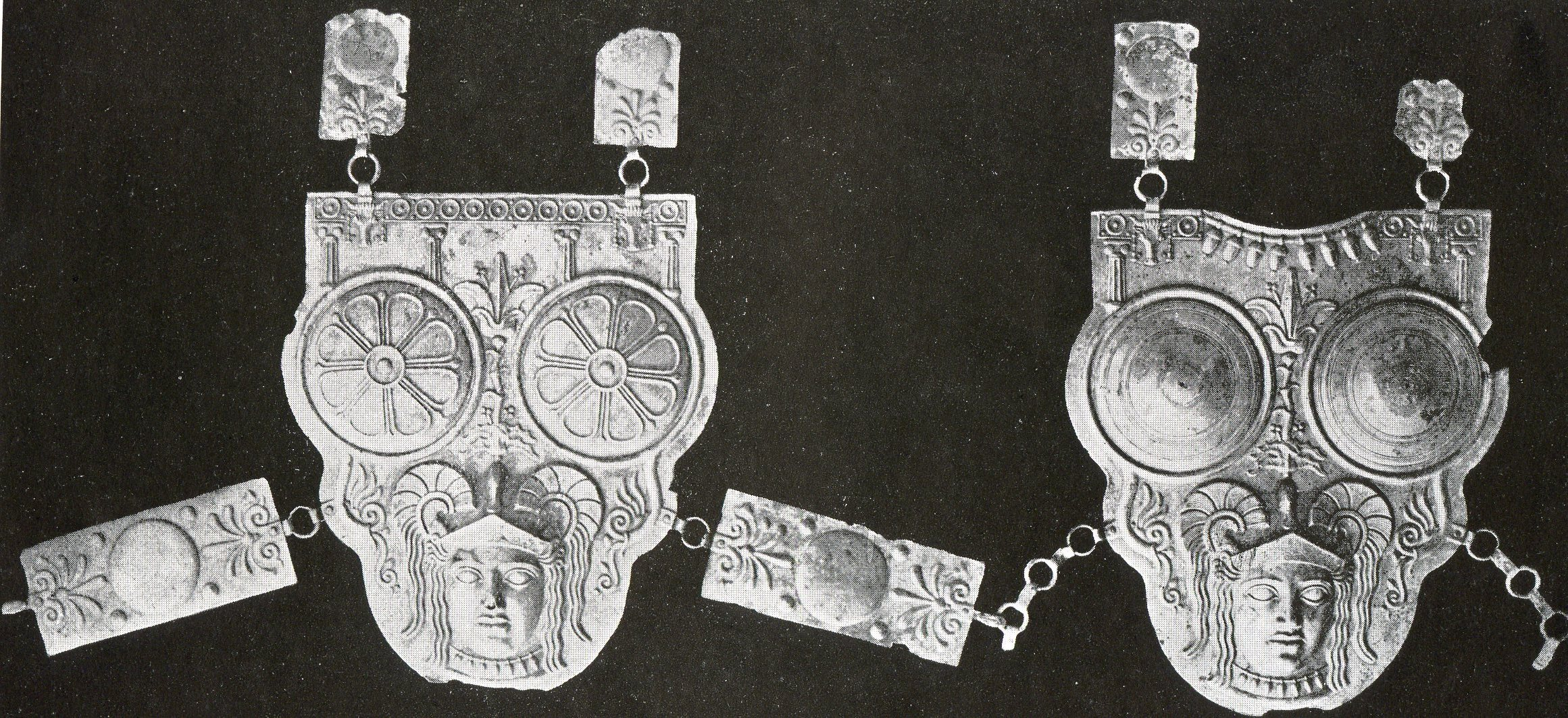
Old photograph of both sides of the cuirass, in the Catalogue du Musée Alaoui published by Ernest Leroux

=== Location and dating of the cuirass ===
The cuirass was discovered by Tunisian workers in a Punic tomb in the south of the village of Ksour Essef, precisely in the locality of Hammada-El-Mekata, 12 km (7.5 mi) south-west of Mahdia in the Tunisian Sahel. The armour was found in a niche on one side of the burial chamber.

Its dating remains relatively uncertain: archaeologists date it from the end of the 2nd century BC, others from the 2nd and 1st centuries BC or around 300 BC.

=== History of the excavations ===
In the context of the French protectorate of Tunisia, particularly from the late 19th century to the early 20th century, Punic necropolises were extensively excavated. At the archaeological site of Carthage, excavations were mainly carried out by White Fathers, such as Alfred Louis Delattre. The opening of the tombs was often the object of mundane ceremonies, attracting the French colonial population.

The cuirass, made by the Carthaginians was found on 20 February 1909, during excavations of a Punic tomb with a well during earthworks. The archaeologist and director of the antiquities service in Tunisia, Alfred Merlin, who was informed at the beginning of the following month, studied the tomb in the company of Louis Poinssot, inspector of antiquities.

The material in the tomb was, however, damaged during the archaeological excavations: two amphorae were broken, before being carefully restored using the fragments collected immediately on the spot. The boards of the sarcophagus, which were damaged during the excavation due to lack of care, are also being restored in the laboratory of the Bardo Museum.

=== Archaeological context ===
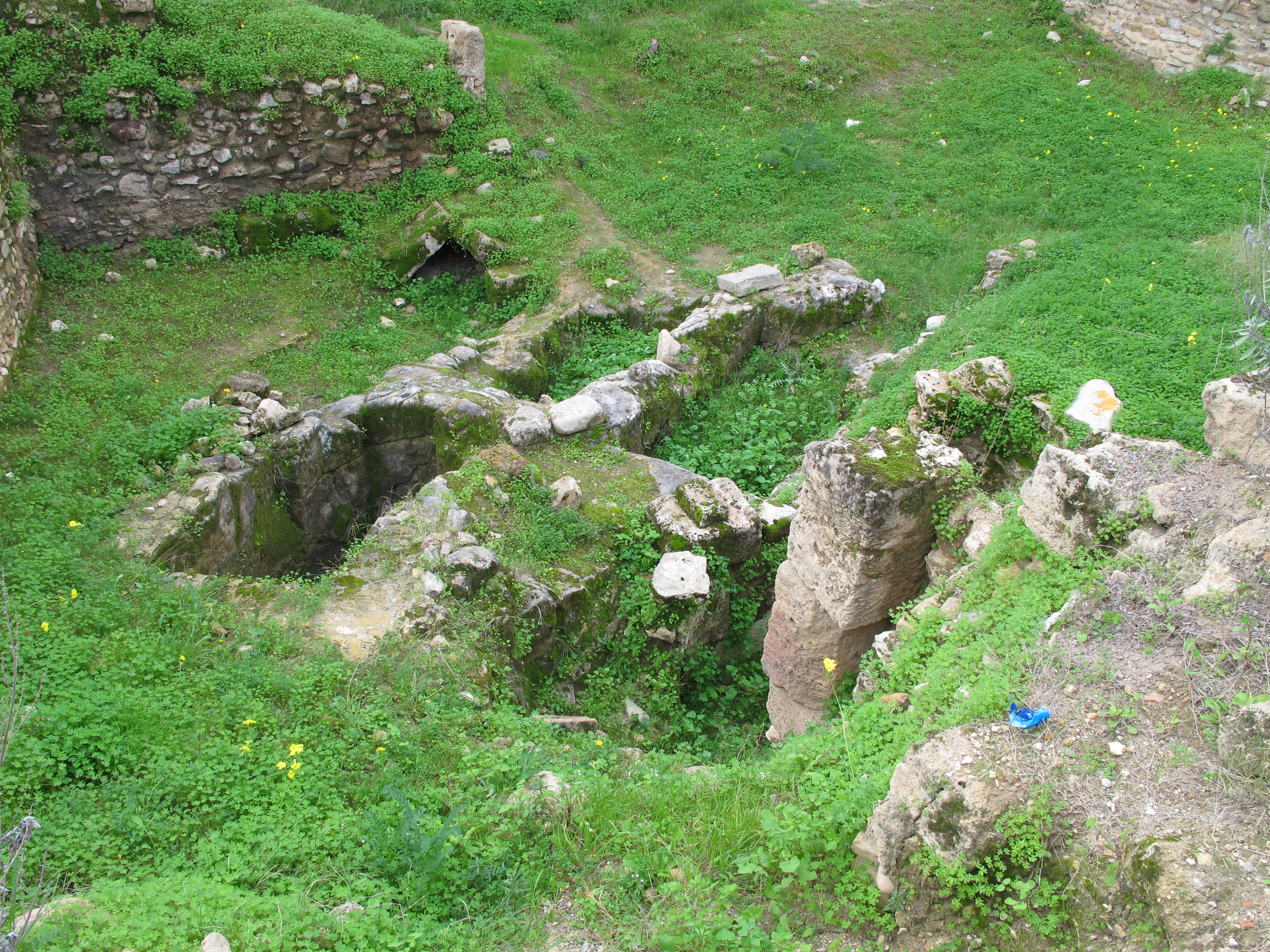
Example of Punic tombs with wells in the archaeological park of the Baths of Antoninus

The type of shaft tomb in which the furniture is found is widespread in the Tunisian Sahel. The tomb has an access shaft and two burial chambers; the shaft, measuring 2.30 m × 1.30 m (7 ft 7 in × 4 ft 3 in), is filled at the time of discovery with stones from the nearby Rejiche quarries. One of the two burial chambers, of about 4 m^{2} (43 sq ft), was empty during the excavations. The other, larger, measures 2 m × 2.40 m (6 ft 7 in × 7 ft 10 in) and 1.60 m (5 ft 3 in) high.

The same tomb contains a cypress wood coffer-sarcophagus covered in red, 0.84 m (2 ft 9 in) high, 1.80 m (5 ft 11 in) long, and 0.68 m (2 ft 3 in) wide. This sarcophagus found in the tomb belongs to a widespread model over a geographical area extending from the Byzacium to Gigthi. Excavations at the beginning of the 20th century mention only one body lying on its back, the bones having been discovered "rather badly preserved and reduced to crumbs for the most part", coated with a reddish-brown pigment, identified with cinnabar. According to Merlin, the deceased may have undergone ritual emaciation prior to burial. Two skeletons were identified in new analyses carried out in Tunisia at the end of the 20th century, one of which belonged to a male individual, 1.70 m (5 ft 7 in) tall and in his forties. The skull bears traces of red ochre.

In addition to the sarcophagus and armour, four amphorae, a bowl, a wooden dish (still containing ochre) and a black glazed lamp were uncovered during the same excavation. Elements of a bronze belt are also found, as are copper metal plates in the sarcophagus that were not reported by Merlin. Habib Ben Younès identifies these fragments as elements of a casket. The cuirass is found at the time of the discovery next to the lamp. The archaeological material was then deposited in the Bardo Museum, where the cuirass "is the most beautiful ornament in a room". Some forgotten elements were found in the museum's storerooms in the 1990s. Ben Younès points out that many testimonies present in the Punic necropolises excavated at the beginning of the 20th century have disappeared, even though they could have provided much information on this civilisation.

== Description ==
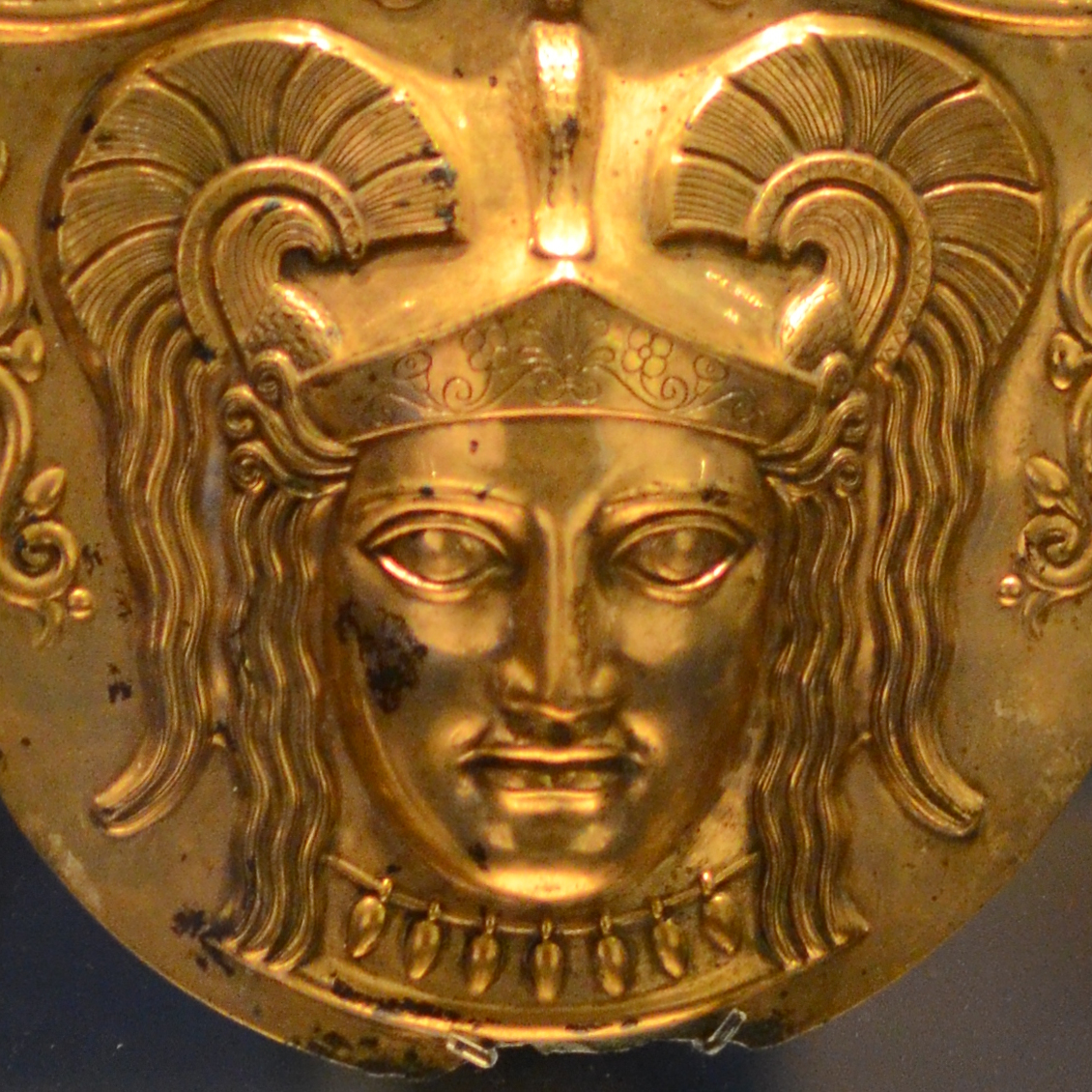
Detail of the divine representation

The cuirass (inv. 01-02-03-01) is identified as belonging to the "kardiophylax" or heart guard type. "The most important piece of the find", it is made of gilded bronze and measures 30 cm (12 in) in height or 28 cm × 30 cm (11 in × 12 in) for the pectoral. The front side measures 42.5 cm × 44 cm (16.7 in × 17.3 in) and the reverse side measures 42 cm × 66 cm (17 in × 26 in)42.

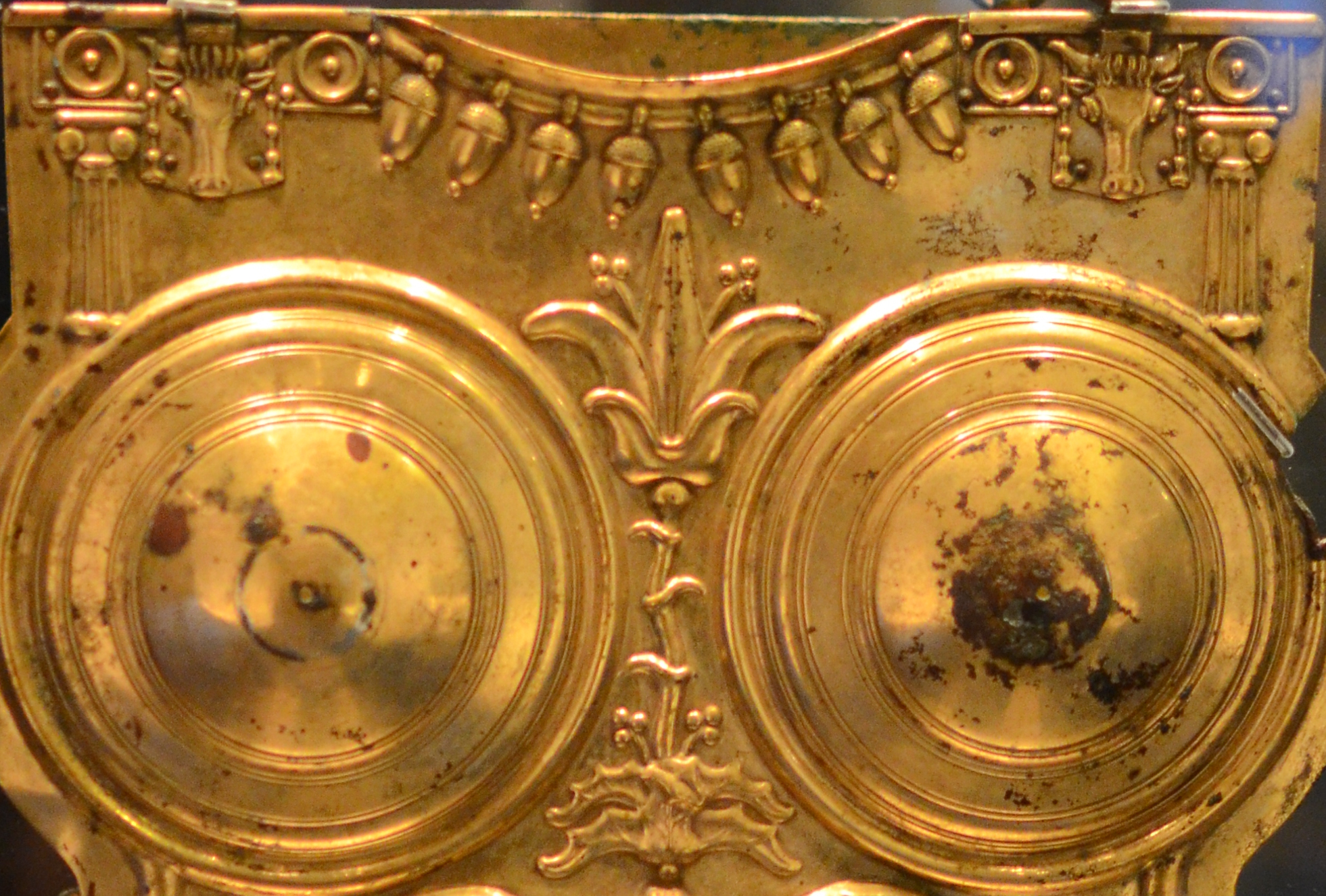
Detail of the floral motifs

It has a breastplate and a backrest or bib: the faces of this part have three raised circles including a representation of Minerva helmeted. Strands of the goddess's hair are visible. Her eyes are large and her lips thick. She is wearing a necklace of acorns, which is reminiscent of the top of the breastplate, which is decorated with a similar necklace of Acorns and bucranium. Her helmet is decorated with Rinceaux and three crests. A palmette motif is also present on each side of the deity's head.

A floral motif, identified as a lily, is located between the circles. The breastplate had a central motif that has now disappeared and was probably made of silver according to Merlin. The pattern on the back is an eight-pointed rosette. Bands for attaching the breastplate with rivets are decorated with globes and palmettes. The breastplate also has geometric and floral decorations that complement its ornamentation.

== Interpretation ==
=== Chronology problem ===
There is a problem of chronological order in the tomb excavated at the beginning of the 20th century. Indeed, the archaeological material found predates the First Punic War and therefore predates the hypothesis formulated by the excavator, dating the armour to the Second Punic War. The study of the archaeological environment of the armour thus makes its chronology hypothetical according to Yann Le Bohec.

According to a classification of the mid-1990s, one of the amphorae dates from the first half of the 4th century BC or even the end of the 5th century BC. A second amphora, can be dated to the same period. A third is of a type produced up to a period estimated to be the second half of the 4th century BC. The attic lamp can also be dated to the fourth century BC. Finally, the cup belongs to a type that was widespread until the 2nd century BC. According to Ben Younès, the preferred date for the funerary deposit would probably be the 4th century BC.

=== Unknown owner but general context assured ===
The cuirass, of "exotic provenance" if we take into account the place of discovery, is not a Carthaginian work but an Italian work, from Southern Italy or Campania, dated to the 2nd century BC according to Merlin. Some of the vases from this Italian region that have survived represent figures wearing such armour: a statuette with the same piece of armour and bronze discs (elements placed on leather garments of a shape similar to that of the armour) are also known.

These protective elements for soldiers were particularly expensive and rare for the time. In 1909, Merlin mentions the presence of similar armour from Apulia in the museums of Karlsruhe, the British Museum and the National Archaeological Museum in Naples. The latter, discovered at Ruvo di Puglia, is "almost identical" to that of Ksour Essef, "the differences [...] are insignificant", even if the latter is in a poorer state of conservation because it is strongly oxidised. The representation of Minerva can be compared to the representations of the same deity known for Campania between 317 and 211 according to the searcher. The belt also belongs to a type present in Southern Italy.

The presence of such a breastplate in Tunisia very quickly prompted historians to link it to the Second Punic War. In this hypothesis, a warrior in Hannibal's army would have brought it back from Italy at the end of the war. Merlin remains cautious, however, and mentions an imported product "like so many other less valuable Campanian products" or ventures to identify the occupant of the tomb as a mercenary buried with products from his country. The fact that he is "a contemporary of the Second Punic War" is linked to the initial dating of the 2nd and 1st centuries BC. The caution that is called for in the various hypotheses formulated by the excavator is not always appropriate in later works.

The work may have belonged to a Libyphenician of the army of Carthage according to Ben Younès, or could simply be a trophy. It may also be a testimony to "the participation of the people, the Libyphenicians, in the war effort of the metropolis of Carthage well before the outbreak of the first Punic war". The armour seems to be in any case a "probable and indirect witness" of the armies or mercenaries of the Carthaginian wars, "probably acquired in Campania" during the Italian stay of the Punic army, between 211 and 203 BC, which makes it an exceptional object.

== See also ==
- Ancient Carthage

== Bibliography and further reading ==
=== General bibliography ===
- Ben Abed, Aïcha (1992). Le musée du Bardo (in French). Tunis: Cérès. ISBN 997370083X.
- Beschaouch, Azedine (2001). "La légende de Carthage". Découvertes Gallimard. Archéologie (in French). Paris: Éditions Gallimard. ISBN 2070532127.
- Dridi, Hédi (2006). Carthage et le monde punique (in French). Paris: Les Belles Lettres. ISBN 2251410333.
- Ennabli, Abdelmajid; Fradier, Georges; Pérez, Jacques (1995). Carthage retrouvée (in French). Tunis/Paris: Cérès/Herscher. ISBN 9973190556.
- Fantar, M'hamed Hassine (1998). Carthage : approche d'une civilisation (in French). Tunis: Alif. ISBN 9973220196.
- Fantar, M'hamed Hassine (2007). Carthage la cité punique (in French). Tunis: Cérès. ISBN 978-9973220196.
- Fantar, M'hamed Hassine; Ouanallah, Samir; Daoulatli, Abdelaziz (2015). Le Bardo. La grande histoire de la Tunisie : musée, sites et monuments (in French). Tunis: Alif. ISBN 978-9-938-95811-9.
- Lancel, Serge (1992). Carthage (in French). Paris: Fayard. ISBN 2213028389.
- Le Bohec, Yann (1995). "Histoire militaire des guerres puniques". L'art de la guerre (in French). Monaco: Éditions du Rocher. ISBN 978-2-268-02147-8.
- Lipiński, Edward (1992). Dictionnaire de la civilisation phénicienne et punique (in French). Turnhout: Brepols. ISBN 2503500331.
- Moscati, Sabatino (1997). Les Phéniciens (in French). Paris: Stock. ISBN 978-2-234-04819-5.
- Picard, Colette (1951). Carthage (in French). Paris: Les Belles Lettres.
- Russo, Alfonsina; Guarneri, Francesca; Xena, Paolla; Zamora Lopez, José Angel (2019). Carthago. The immortal myth. Verona: Electa. ISBN 978-8-891-82523-0.
- Slim, Hédi; Fauqué, Nicolas (2001). La Tunisie antique : de Hannibal à saint Augustin (in French). Paris: Mengès. ISBN 285620421X.
- Slim, Hédi; Mahjoubi, Ammar; Belkhodja, Khaled; Ennabli, Abdelmajid (2003). Histoire générale de la Tunisie (in French). Vol. I « L'Antiquité ». Paris: Maisonneuve et Larose. ISBN 2706816953.
- Yacoub, Mohamed (1993). Le musée du Bardo : départements antiques (in French). Tunis: Agence nationale du patrimoine.
- Collective (1995). Carthage. L'histoire, sa trace et son écho (in French). Paris: Association française d'action artistique. ISBN 9973220269.
- Collective (2019). Carthago (in English and Italian). Verona: Electa. ISBN 978-8-891-82524-7.

=== Work on the cuirass ===
- Ben Younès, Habib (2001). "La cuirasse de Ksour Essaf au Sahel tunisien : problème de chronologie". Pallas (in French) (56): 67–70.
- Ben Younès, Habib (1997). "Découverte de deux nouveaux éléments dans le mobilier de la tombe à la cuirasse de Ksour Essaf au Sahel tunisien" (PDF). Reppal (in French) (10): 35–39. Archived from the original (PDF) on 13 July 2020.
- Merlin, Alfred (1909). "Découverte d'une cuirasse italiote près de Ksour-Es-Saf (Tunisie)". Monuments et mémoires de la Fondation Eugène Piot (in French). 17 (2): 125–138. doi:10.3406/piot.1909.1336.
