= Amor Rourou =

Tunisian politician

- عمر رورو

Minister of Industry, Energy and Mines
- In office 7 November 1979 – 25 April 1980
- President: Habib Bourguiba
- Prime Minister: Hédi Nouira
- Preceded by: Rachid Sfar
- Succeeded by: Abdelaziz Lasram

Personal details
- Born: March 16, 1931 Ksar Hellal, Monastir Governorate, Tunisia
- Occupation: Politician

Amor Rourou (Arabic: عمر رورو), born 16 March 1931 in Ksar Hellal, is a Tunisian high official and politician.

== Biography ==
He held numerous positions in the Tunisian senior civil service: head of the geophysical service at the Company for research and exploitation of oils in Tunisia until 1967, in 1970 he became general deputy director, and then he took the CEO position.

At the same time, he held several positions in the government, Minister of Industry, Mines and Energy from 1979 to 1980.
