= Ksar Hellal =

- Commune and town
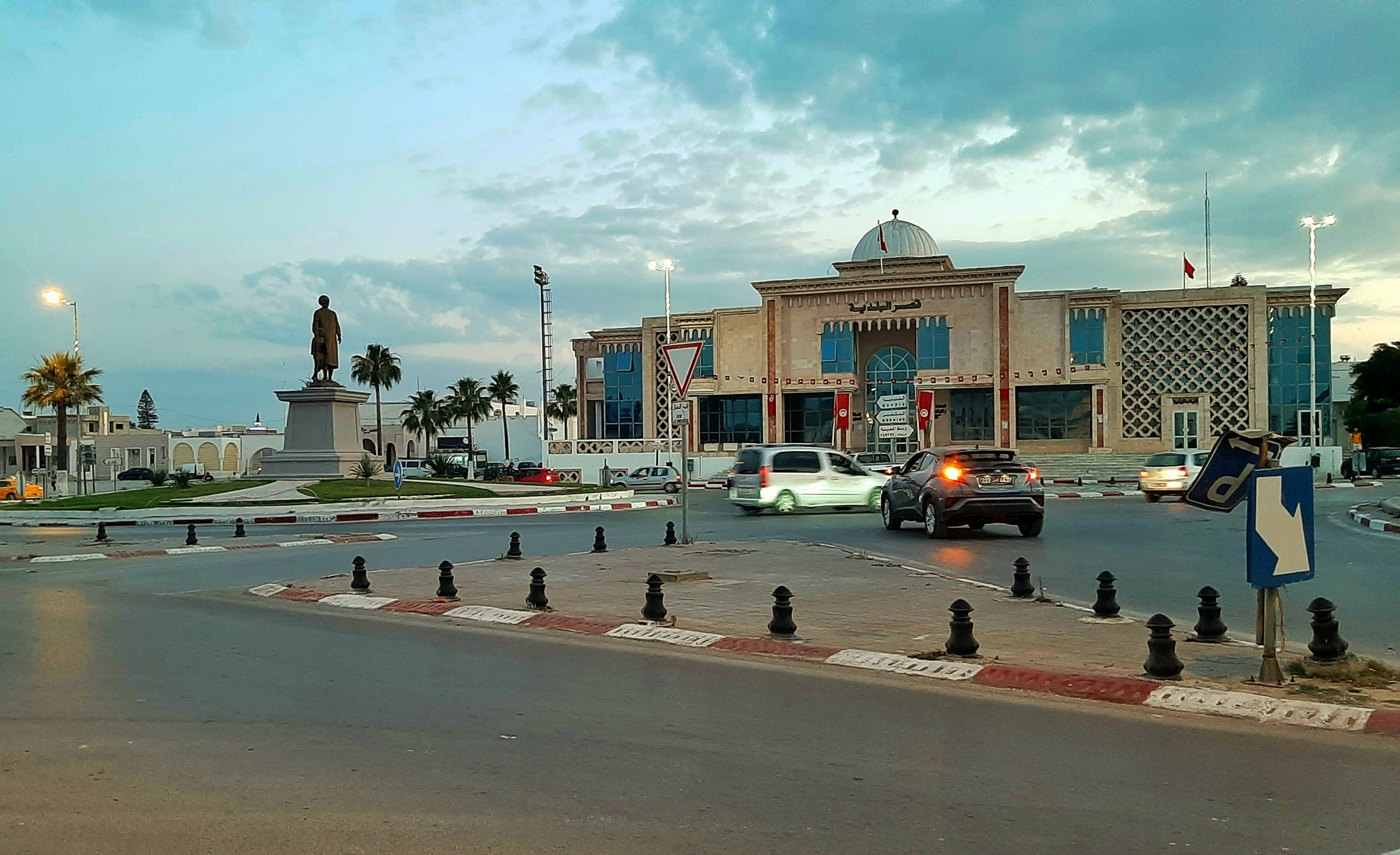
- Ksar Hellal town hall
- Nickname: عاصمة النسيج capitale de textile
- Location within Tunisia
- Coordinates: 35°38′34.4″N 10°53′28.0″E
- Country: Tunisia
- Governorate: Monastir Governorate

Population (2022)
  - Total: 55,415
- Time zone: UTC+1 (CET)
- Postal code: 5070

Ksar Hellal (Arabic: قصر هلال, romanized: Qaṣr Hilāl) is a town and commune in the Monastir Governorate, Tunisia. As of 2014 it had a population of 49,376.

Ksar Hellal is known for its traditional textile industry, which has long been a key part of its local economy. The town is also historically significant for hosting the Ksar Hellal Congress in 1934, a landmark event in the Tunisian national movement that led to the creation of the Neo-Destour Party.

== Notable people ==
- Houcine Dimassi, the Minister of Finance, Under Prime Minister Hamadi Jebali
- Ons Jabeur, professional tennis player
- Nejib Ayed, film producer
- Haj Ali Soua, a Tunisian trader and philanthropist
- Amor Rourou, Politician
- Abdelfattah Boussetta, a Tunisian Sculptor and visual artist
- M'hamed Hassine Fantar, a Tunisian author and historian

== Population ==
2014 Census (Municipal)
Homes	Families	Males	Females	Total
14340	12161	24467	24909	49376

== See also ==
- List of cities in Tunisia
- Evolution of Textile Monument (Ksar Hellal)
