= Haj Ali Soua =

Tunisian philanthropist

- الحاج علي صوة
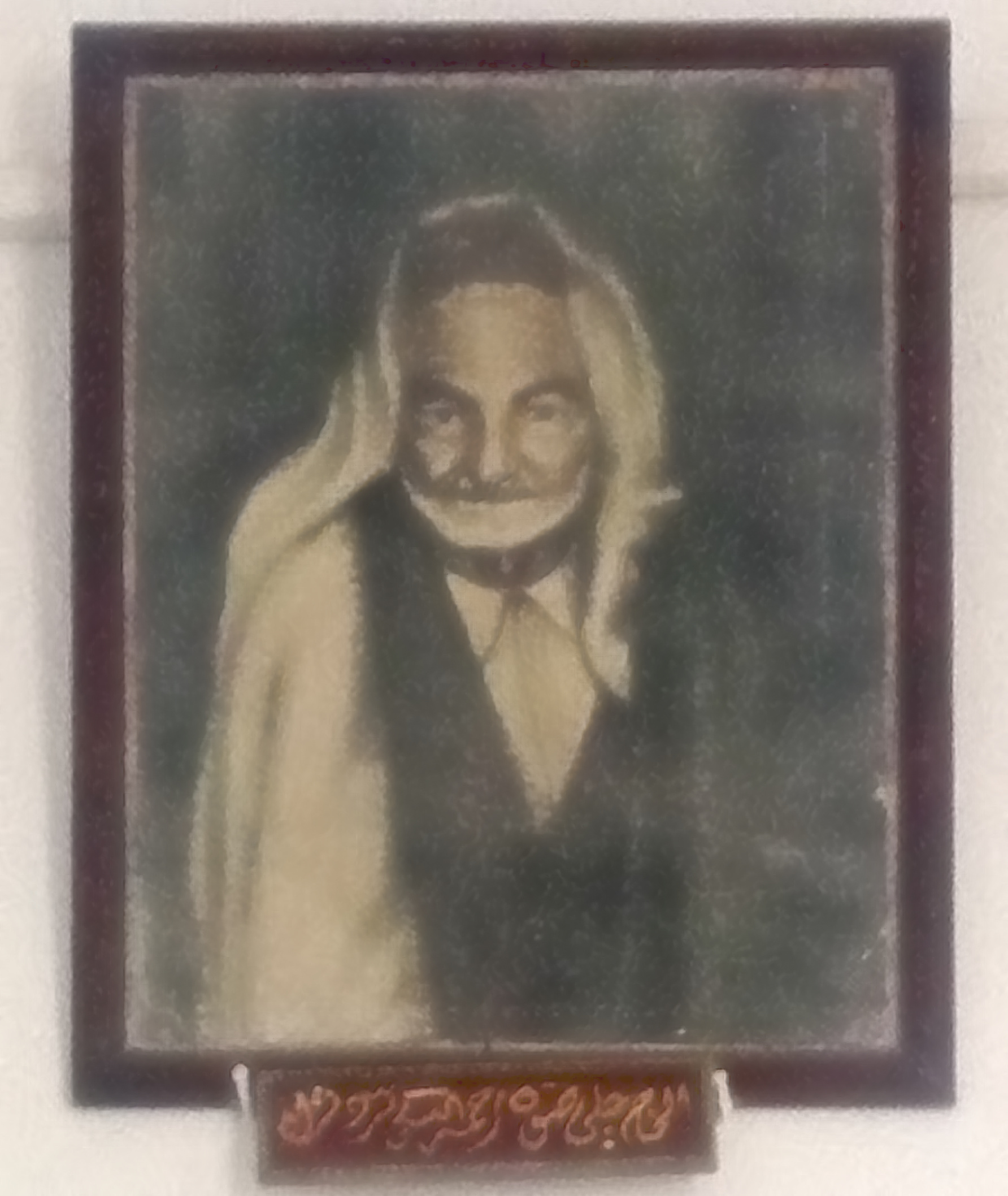
- Portrait in the primary school bearing his name
- Born: 1870; Ksar Hellal, Monastir Governorate, Tunisia
- Died: 1953 (aged 82–83); Tunisia
- Occupation(s): Trader, philanthropist

Haj Ali Soua (Arabic: الحاج علي صوة, romanized: al-Ḥājj ʻAlī Ṣūwah), was born in Ksar Hellal in 1870 and died in 1953, was a Tunisian trader and philanthropist.

== Biography ==
Born in Ksar Hellal in 1870 and by having lost his father in a young age, Haj Ali Soua has to face the difficulties of life by doing odd jobs in agriculture and textiles, before specializing in the cotton trade which allowed him to amass a small fortune.

Haj Ali Soua is best known for his philanthropic works, including:

- The construction and financing of a primary school in 1929 which today bears his name: The Haj Ali Soua Primary School
- the construction and financing of a local hospital, which has now become regional, and which also bears his name: The Haj Ali Soua Regional Hospital

A street in Ksar Hellal today bears his name.
