= National Monument of the Kasbah =

- المعلم الوطني بساحة القصبة (Arabic)
- National Monument
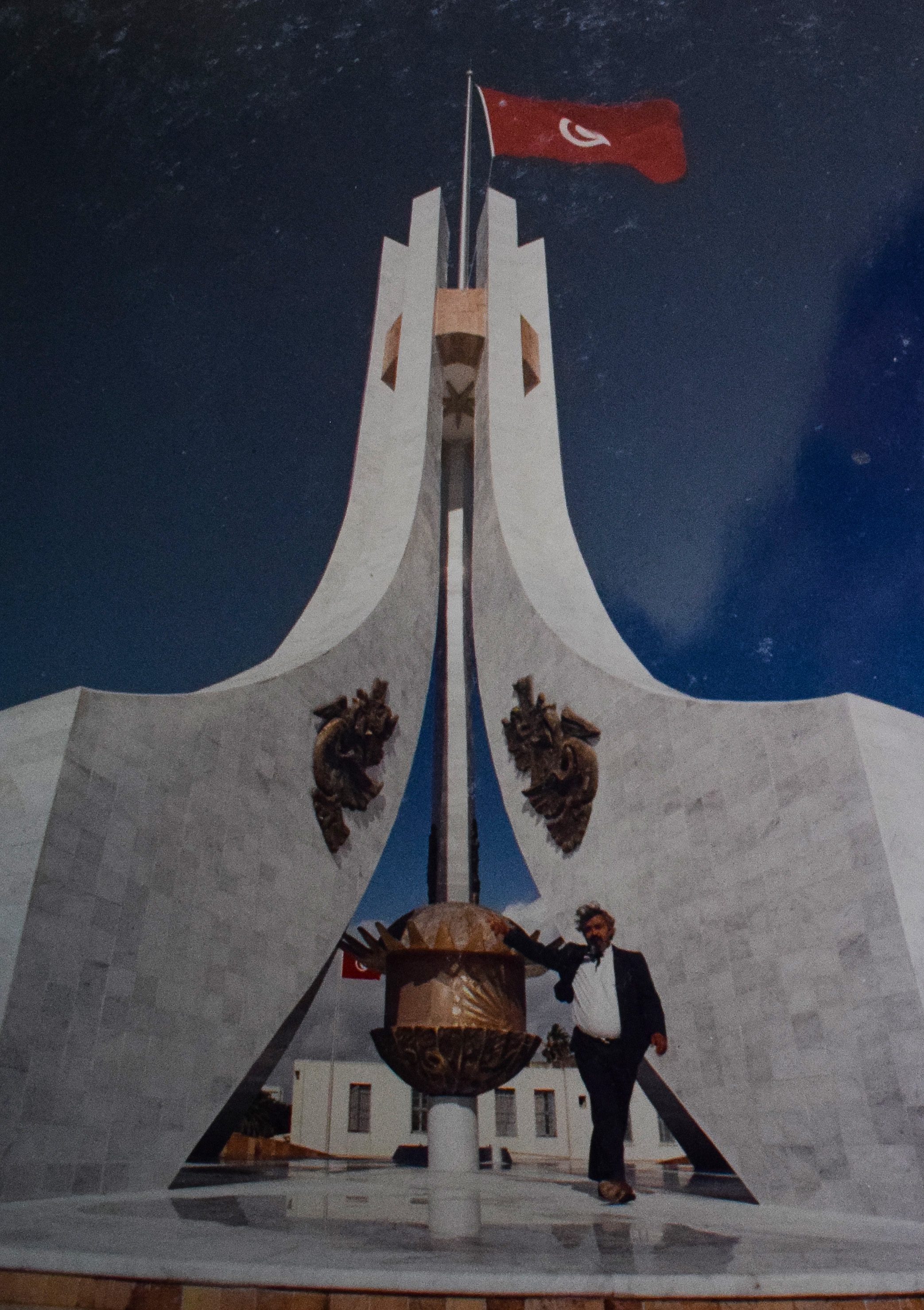
- Abdelfattah Boussetta posing in front of the National Monument of the Kasbah in 1989.

- Location within Tunisia
- 36°47′51.7″N 10°10′0.4″E
- Type: Monument
- Location: Kasbah Square; Tunis, Tunisia

History
- Built: 1989

Site notes
- Height: 22 metres (72 ft)
- Sculptor: Abdelfattah Boussetta

The National Monument of the Kasbah (Arabic: المعلم الوطني بساحة القصبة), more simply called the National Monument, is a memorial monument and a prominent symbol of several events in Tunisia. It is located in the center of the Kasbah Square in Tunis, facing the Town Hall.

The monument was designed and executed by the Tunisian sculptor Abdelfattah Boussetta in 1989.

It also appears as a background image on the Tunisian ID cards.

== Gallery ==
The Monument seen from different angles

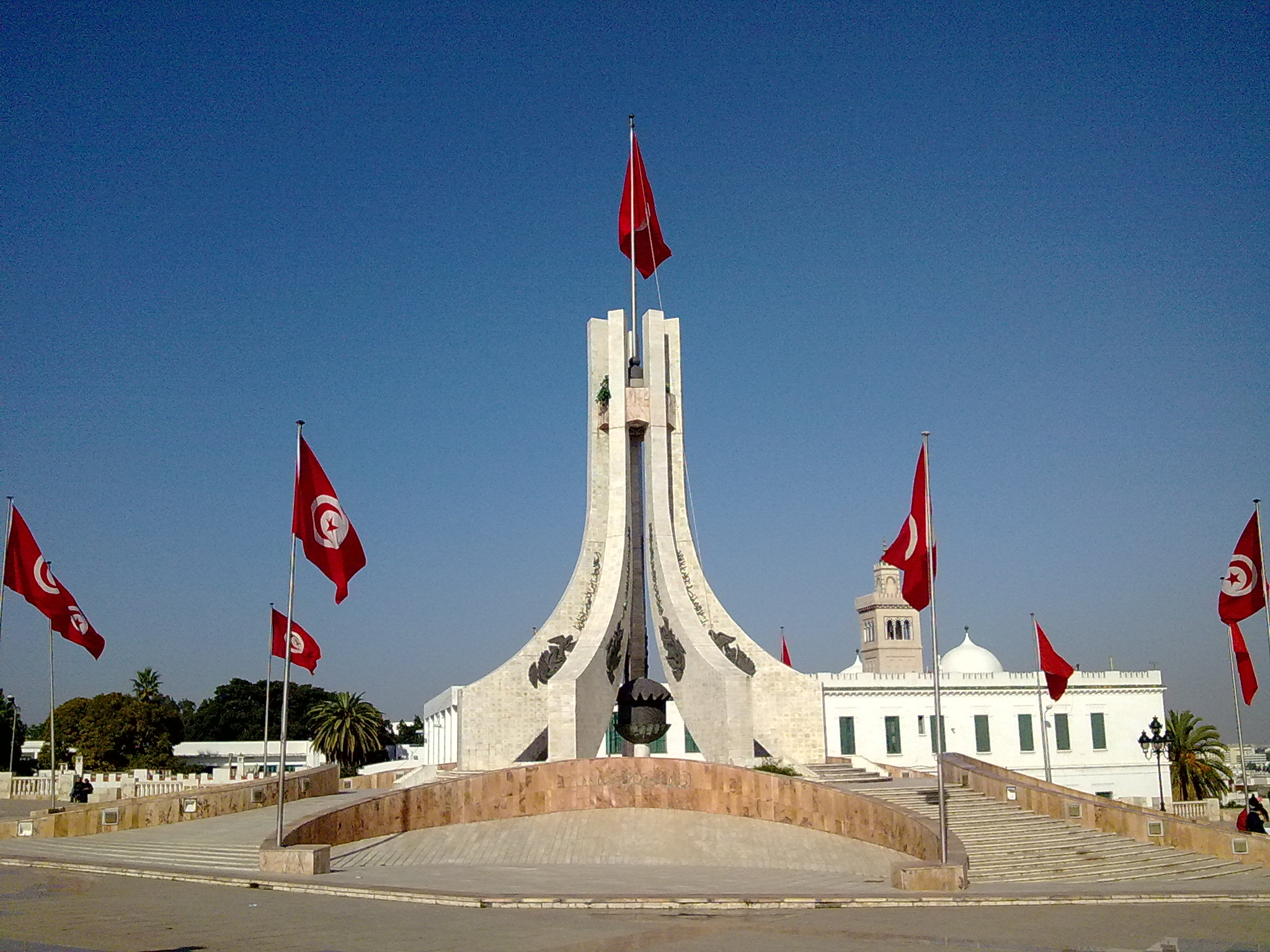
The National Monument of the Kasbah, general view.

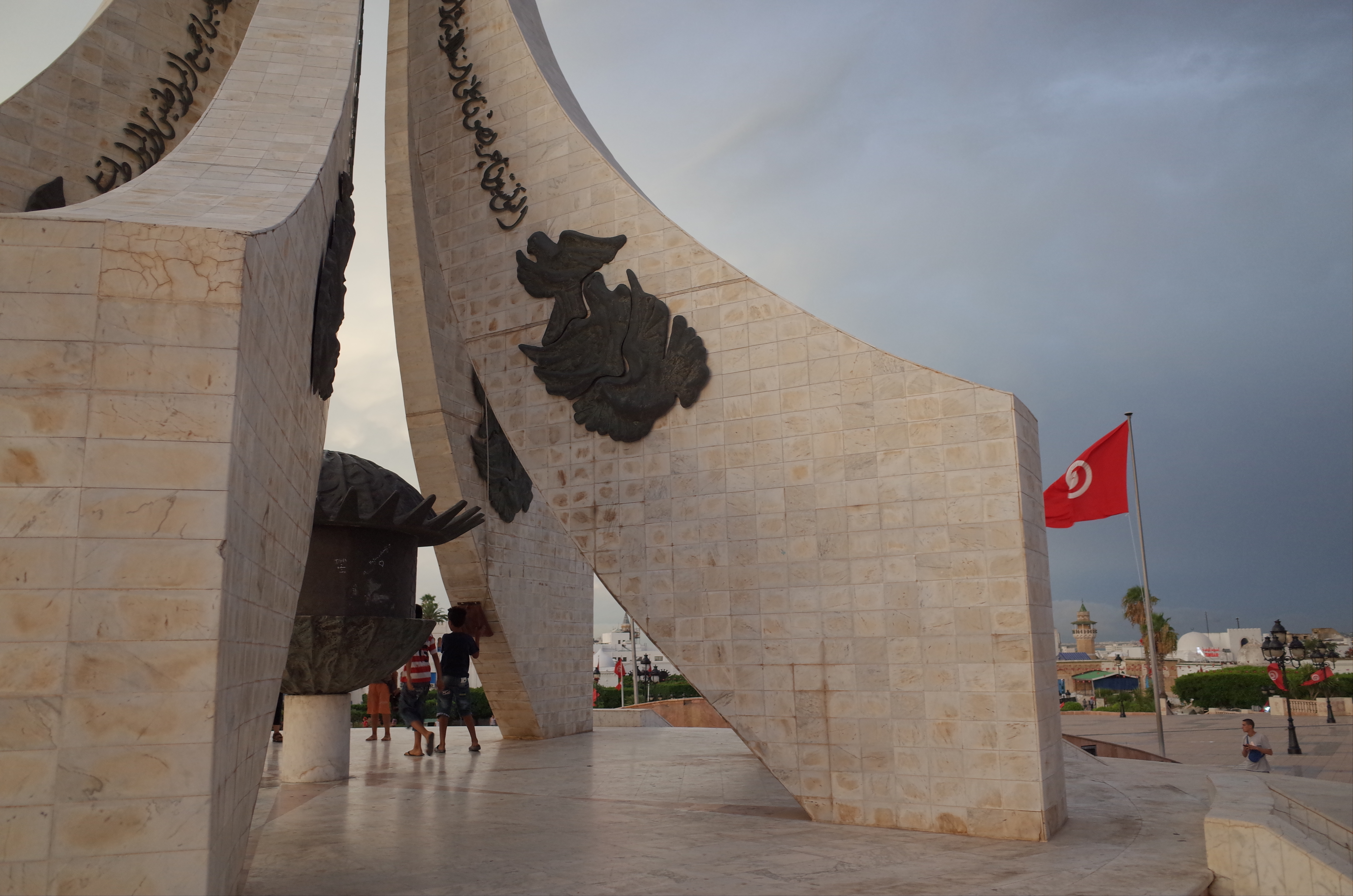
The National Monument of the Kasbah, bottom.

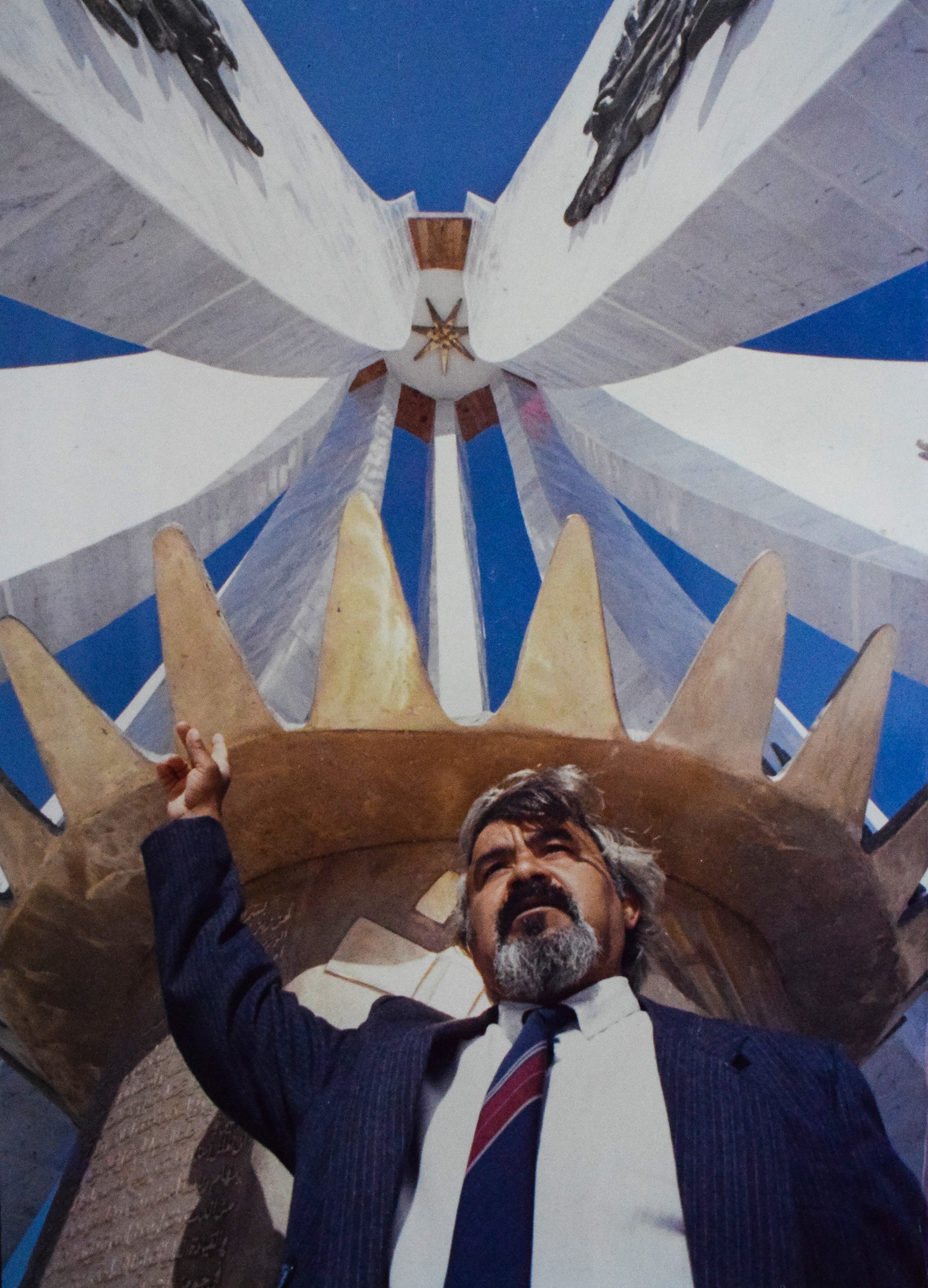
Upward view of the monument in 1989, with the sculptor Abdelfattah Boussetta.
