= Nejib Ayed =

Tunisian film producer (1953–2019)

- نجيب عياد
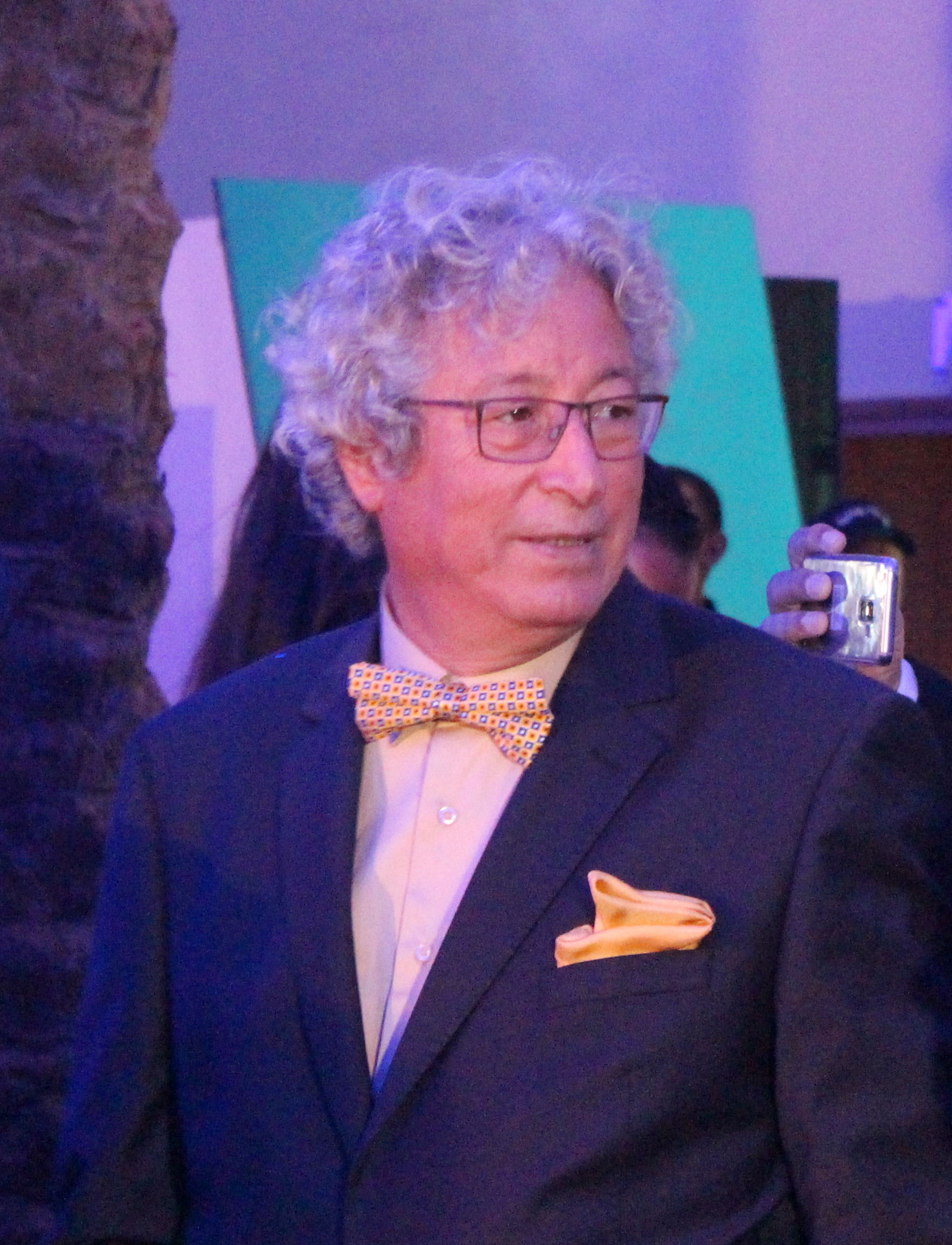
- Nejib Ayed during the Carthage film festival in 2018.
- Born: December 13, 1953; Ksar Hellal, Tunisia
- Died: August 16, 2019 (aged 65); Tunis
- Occupation: Film Producer

Nejib Ayed (Arabic: نجيب عياد; December 13, in Ksar Hellal, 1953 in Ksar Hellal – August 16, 2019) was a Tunisian producer. He was the executive director of the Carthage Film Festival in 2017 and 2018.

== Biography ==
Born in 1953 in Ksar Hellal, in the Sousse region, Néjib Ayed is part of a generation that has combined a passion for cinema and an almost militant commitment within the Tunisian Federation of Film Clubs. In the 1970s, marked by Burgundian authoritarianism, these circles represented spaces for political learning. After studying French literature, Néjib Ayed tried his hand at film criticism before joining, in 1980, the Tunisian Anonymous Company for Cinematographic Production and Expansion (Satpec), a public institution (privatized since) which groups all stages cinematographic: the production for which he was responsible, but also the production, exploitation, and distribution.

The films he produces do not hesitate to deal with sensitive societal issues. "He was the first to address sexual harassment on the screen," recalls feminist activist Mounira Hammami.

In 2008, in Tunisia still under authoritarian rule, La Chasse aux gazelles recounts the violence at work of a young woman employed in a textile factory and coveted by her superior. It is one of ten soap operas broadcast on television during the month of Ramadan, a date that Tunisians love after the break in the fast. Then, in 2015 and 2016, mafia, drugs, and organ trafficking were the subjects of the series Naouret El Hawa ("the windmill"). A disconcerting drama, but one that marked the public.

== Filmography ==
- 1982 : Shadow of the Earth
