= Triple-disc cuirass =

Ancient type of armor breastplate

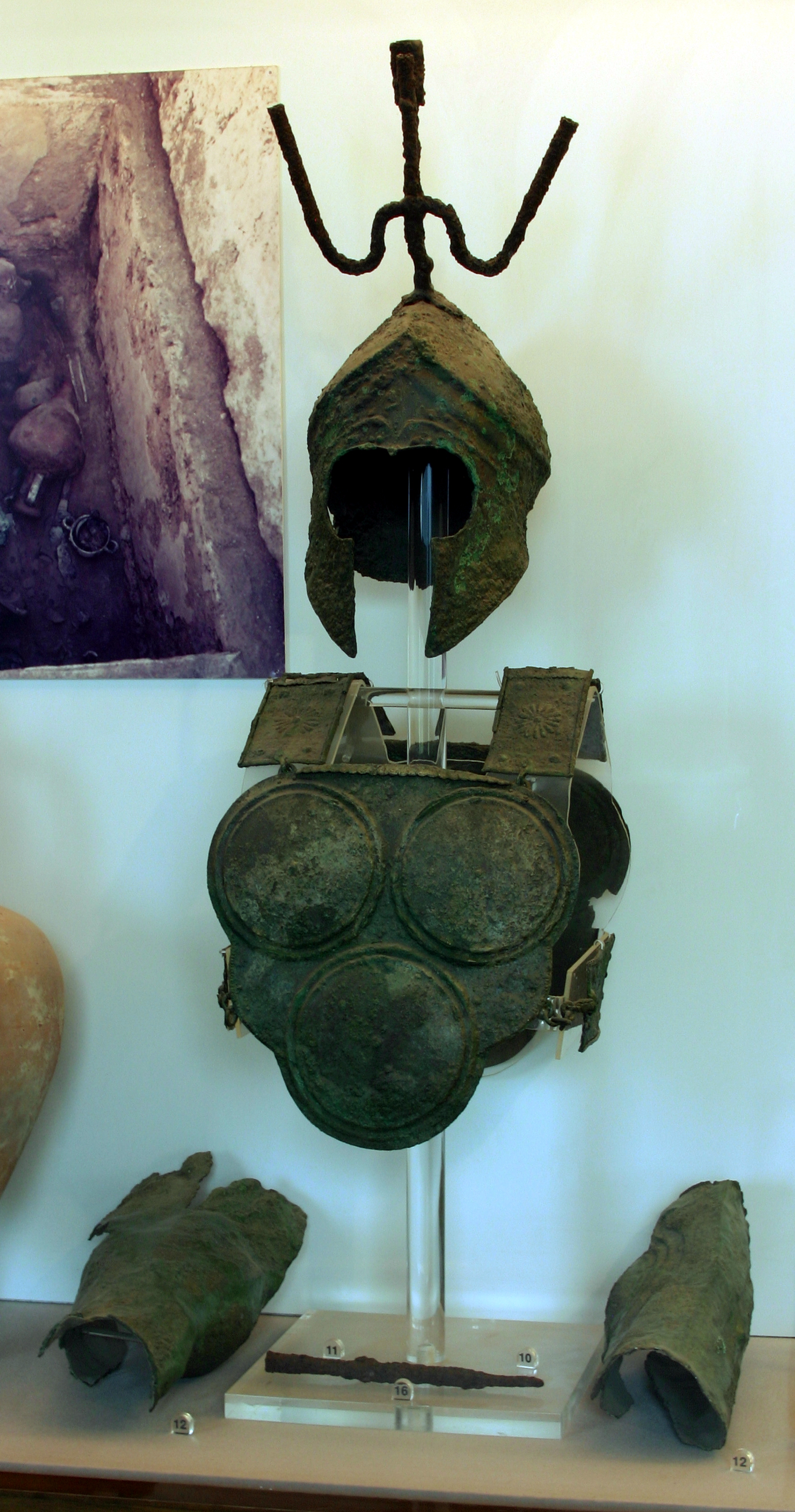
Panoply with Attic helmet, triple-disc cuirass and greaves in the Museo Archeologico Nazionale of Paestum

The triple-disc cuirass was a type of bronze cuirass used in Southern Italy during the fifth and fourth centuries BC. It is named after the three discs, two on top and one on the bottom, which form a triangular plate of armor for the chest. The chest plate was connected to a back plate with shoulder- and side-plates. Modern scholars frequently call this armor a Samnite cuirass, but it is not clear that it was a symbol of their identity. It offered a greater amount of protection than the single-disc kardiophylax.

According to an inventory by Horsnaes, the vast majority of triple-disc breastplates, at least thirteen, have been found at Poseidonia. Six of these have been dated to the period of 420–350 BC and one to the late fourth century BC. Burns gives a higher count of 38, of which only two have been found outside of Southern Italy: one at Vulci and the Ksour Essef cuirass at Carthage. All of these were found in graves.

Burns argues that the triple-disc cuirass was developed in the central Apennine region of Italy. The earliest examples have been recovered from the necropolis at Alfedena in the Abruzzo and are dated to the second half of the fifth century BC. No examples of triple-disc cuirasses have been found in Campania, but it is the most frequently depicted type of armor on red-figure pottery from that region, which implies its use there as well. The appearance of the triple-disc cuirass in tombs and other representative artifacts from Campania, Lucania and Apulia coincides with the conquest of these regions by Samnite peoples.

== Notes ==
1. The aforementioned Poseidonia is part of the modern region Campania today, but was located on the northern border of the region Lucania in classical antiquity.

== Sources ==
- Burns, Michael T. (2003). "The Homogenisation of Military Equipment Under the Roman Republic". Digressus. Supplementum 1: 60–85.
- Cleland, Liza; Davies, Glenys; Llewellyn-Jones, Lloyd (2007). Greek and Roman Dress from A to Z. Abingdon-on-Thames: Routledge. ISBN 9781134589166.
- Horsnaes, Helle W. (2002). The Cultural Development in North Western Lucania c. 600–273 BC. Rome: L'erma di Brettschneider. ISBN 9788882651947.
- Fields, Nic (2011). Early Roman Warrior 753-321 BC. Osprey Publishing. ISBN 9781849084994.
