= Shadow of the Earth =

1982 Tunisian film

- Directed by: Taieb Louhichi
- Produced by: Nejib Ayed
- Starring: Despina Tomazani
- Release date: 1982
- Running time: 90 minutes
- Country: Tunisia
- Language: Arabic

Shadow of the Earth (Arabic: Dhil al ardh) is a 1982 Tunisian drama film directed by Taïeb Louhichi. It was entered into the 13th Moscow International Film Festival and was also screened by the International Critics' Week in Cannes Festival.

== Plot ==
This film follows the last members of an isolated border encampment. The patriarch of the community lives in one of the four tents that make up the entirety of the camp, along with a sheepfold. The three other tents are inhabited by the patriarch's son and nephews along with their families. Their wheat provisions are slowly running out, and their cattle, stricken by an unknown disease, is dying. The patriarch's sons leave the community and head north to join the army or to try their luck abroad. The patriarch and his daughter-in-law are the only ones left at the camp until she too must leave; she travels to the capital to say goodbye to her husband, deceased while looking for work abroad. This film is the chronicle of a community threatened by the curses of nature, threats from across the border and central powers. It is also a beautiful visual poem that brings back to life, through human memory, the legend of Arab and foreign invaders.

== Cast ==
- Despina Tomazani
- Hélène Catzaras
- Mouna Noureddine
- Rachel Khémir
- Abdellaziz Ben Mahmoud
- Mohammed Mansour
- M'Barka Jrad

=== Accolades ===
- Cannes Film Festival (1982) : Unesco Prize and Mention of the Ecumenical Jury
- Mannheim-Heidelberg International Filmfestival (1982) : Golden Doukat for
- Taormina Film Fest (1982) : City Prize and Italian Critic Prize
- Moscow International Film Festival (1983) : Special Jury Prize for
- Panafrican Film and Television Festival of Ouagadougou (1983) : Best Screenplay and Best Operator
- International Film Festival Vues d'Afrique (1985) : Grand Prize of Les Journées du cinéma africain de Montréal
