= Abdelfattah Boussetta =

Tunisian sculptor and painter

- عبد الفتاح بوستة
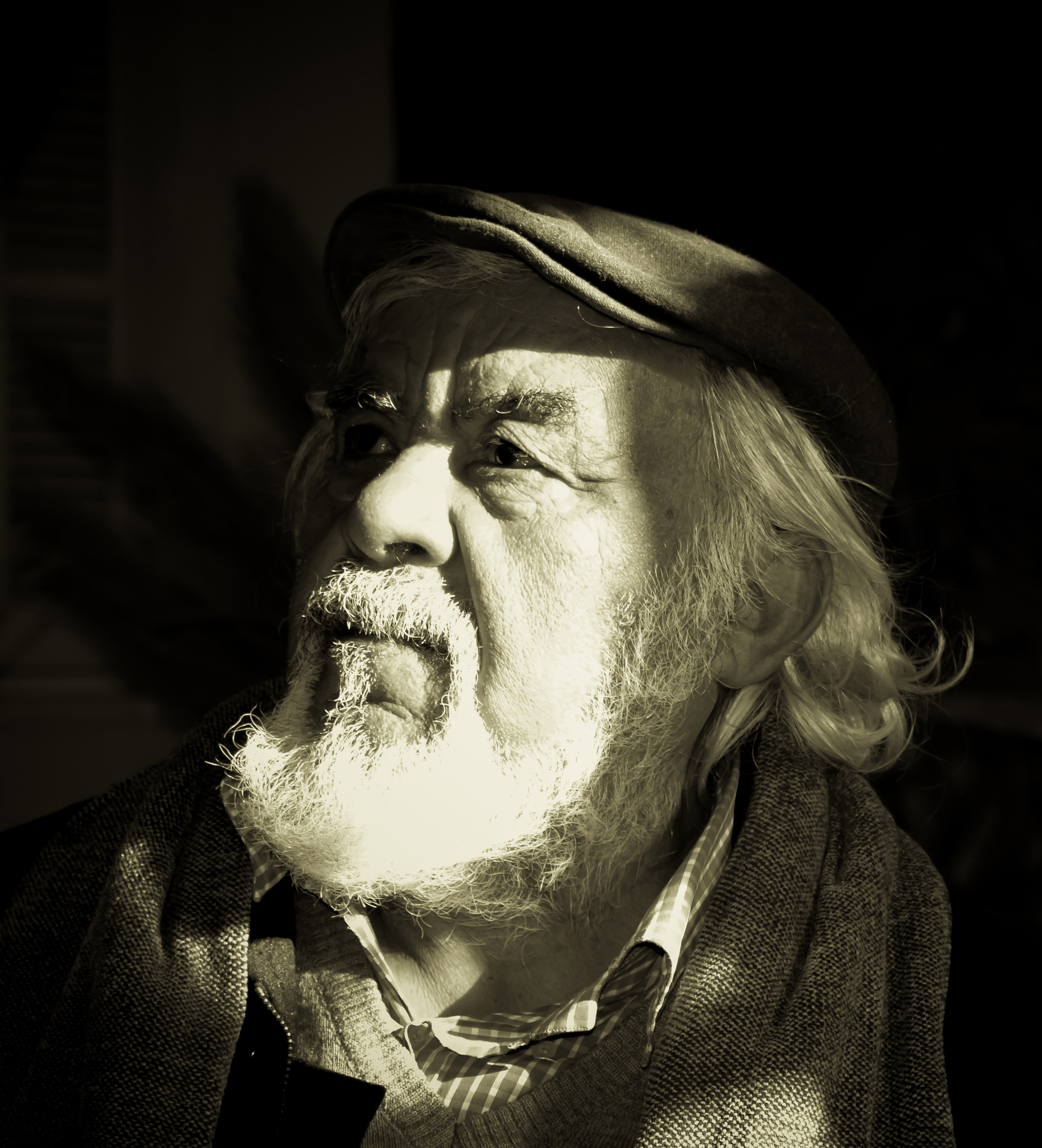
- Abdelfattah Boussetta in 2019
- Born: Abdelfattah Boussetta; 25 January 1947; Ksar Hellal, Monastir Governorate, Tunisia
- Occupation: Visual artist
- Known for: Sculpture, painting

Abdelfattah Boussetta (Arabic: عبد الفتاح بوستة; born January 25, 1947), is a Tunisian sculptor, and painter. He has participated in many international exhibitions and realized many monuments in Tunisia, including the National Monument of the Kasbah in Tunis.
