= M'hamed Hassine Fantar =

Tunisian author, historian and professor

- محمد حسين فنطر
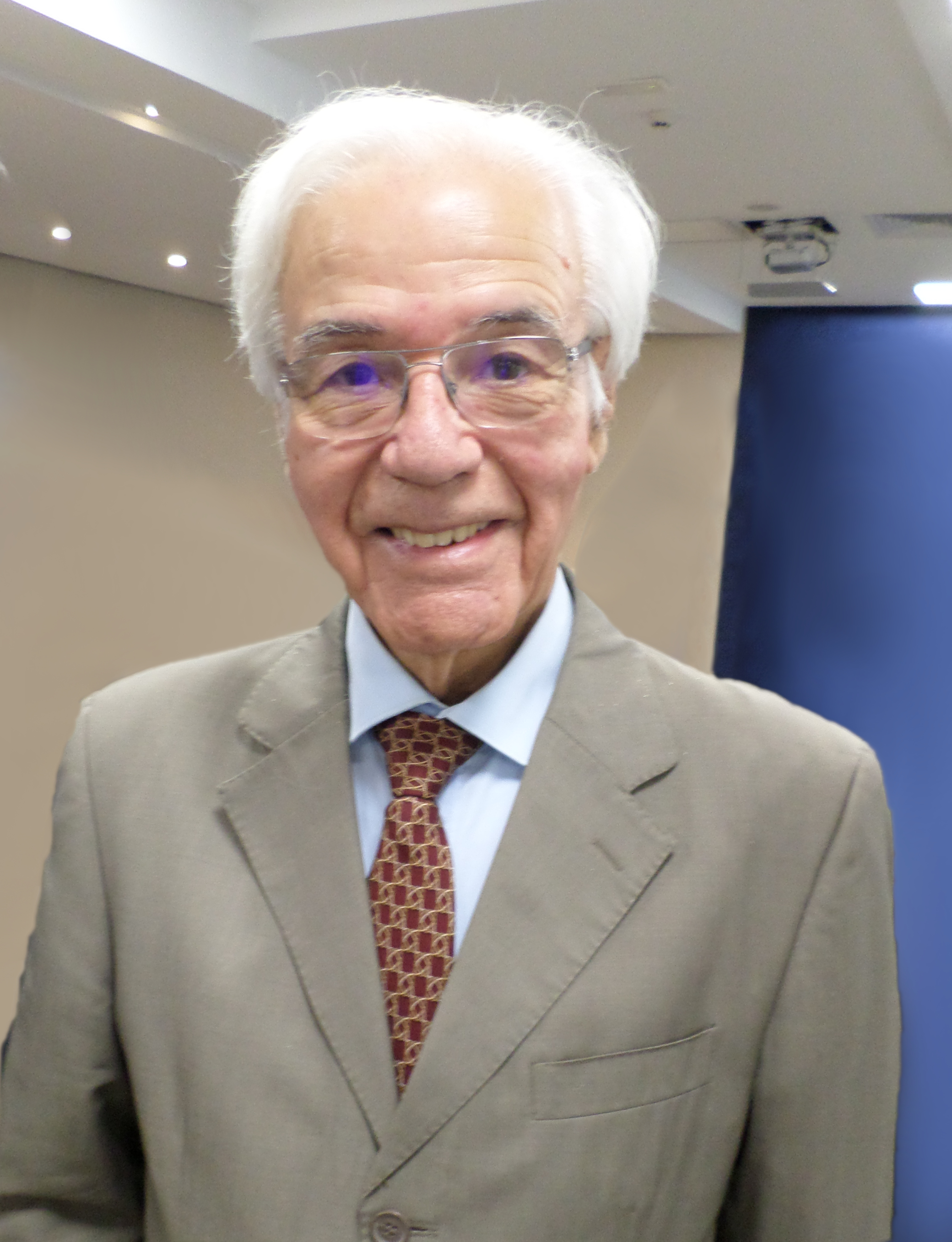
- Born: October 1, 1936 (age 89); Ksar Hellal, Tunisia
- Occupations: author, historian, professor
- Website: www.mhamed-hassine-fantar.com

M'hamed Hassine Fantar (Arabic: محمد حسين فنطر, born October 1, 1936, in Ksar Hellal) is a professor of Ancient History of Archeology and History of Religion at Tunis University.

== Biography ==
He was born in Ksar Hellal and received a BA in Classics from University of Strasbourg and a PhD in History from the Pantheon-Sorbonne University.

Within the National Institute of Archeology and Art, which later became the National Heritage Institute (Tunisia), he served as Research Director before becoming general manager between 1982 and 1987.

Director of the Division of Museums, then Director of Center for the Study of Phoenician-Punic Civilization and Libyan Antiquities, he's the Founder of the Revue des études phéniciennes-puniques et des antiquités libyques (Reppal).

Professor emeritus of the universities, he teaches archeology and history of the West-Semitic and Libyan religions at the university of Tunis.

He's Member of the Association for the Promotion of Studies on Prehistoric, Ancient and Medieval North Africa, of the Committee on Historical and Scientific Works and the World Heritage Committee. He's also a Corresponding Member at the German Archaeological Institute, at the Real Academia de la Historia and at the Accademia dei Lincei.

President of the Tunisian Association for History and Archeology, he's the author of many books and a hundred of academic papers devoted to the Ancient Carthage.

== Published works ==
- Nouvelles tombes puniques découvertes sur les flancs de la colline du Borj Jedid à Carthage (Centro per le antichità e la storia dell'arte del Vicino: Rome, 1965)
- La Nécropole (Istituto di studi del Vicino Oriente: Rome, 1966)
- Eschatologie phénicienne-punique (Ministry of Culture: Tunis, 1970)
- Carthage : la prestigieuse cité d'Elissa (Maison tunisienne de l'édition: Tunis, 1970)
- Téboursouk : stèles anépigraphes et stèles à inscriptions néopuniques (Klincksieck: Paris, 1974)
- Le dieu de la mer chez les phéniciens et les puniques (Consiglio nazionale delle ricerche: Rome, 1977)
- L'Afrique du Nord dans l'Antiquité. Histoire et civilisation des origines au Ve siècle, with François Decret (Payot: Paris, 1981)
- Kerkouane, cité punique du cap Bon (Tunisie), « Cadre géographique et historique. La découverte » (Institut national d'archéologie et d'art: Tunis, 1984)
- Kerkouane, cité punique du cap Bon (Tunisie), « Architecture domestique » (Institut national d'archéologie et d'art: Tunis, 1985)
- Kerkouane, cité punique du cap Bon (Tunisie), « Sanctuaires et cultes. Société. Économie » (Institut national d'archéologie et d'art: Tunis, 1986)
- Kerkouane : une cité punique au Cap-Bon (Maison tunisienne de l'édition: Tunis, 1987)
- Le Bardo, un palais, un musée (Alif: Tunis, 1989)
- Carthage : les lettres et les arts (Alif: Tunis, 1991)
- Carthage : la cité punique (CNRS: Paris, 1995)
- Carthage : approche d'une civilisation (Alif: Tunis, 1993)
- Les Phéniciens en Méditerranée (Édisud: Aix-en-Provence, 1997)
- Kerkouane : cité punique au pays berbère de Tamezrat (Alif: Tunis, 1998)
- Carthage : la cité d'Hannibal (Gallimard: Paris, 2007)
- Stèles à inscriptions néopuniques de Maktar, with Maurice Sznycer (De Boccard: Paris, 2015)
- Le Bardo, la grande histoire de la Tunise, collectif work (Alif: Tunis, 2015)

== Honours and awards ==
=== Honours ===
- Commander of the Order of the Republic
- Grand Officer of the National Order of Merit
- Officer of the National Order of Merit (France)
- Officer of the Order of Merit of the Italian Republic

=== Awards ===
- Prize of the Académie Française (France)
- Prize of the Académie des Inscriptions et Belles-Lettres (France)
- Tunisian National Prize for Culture (Tunisia)
- Sabatino Moscati's Award of History (Italy)
- Tunisian Prize for Human Rights (Tunisia)
- Tunisian Prize for Religious Studies (Tunisia)
- Prize Amedeo Maiuri of Archeology (Italy)

=== Honorary degrees ===
- University of Bologna
- University of Sassari
