= Tunis =

Capital and largest city of Tunisia

Tunis تونس
- Capital city
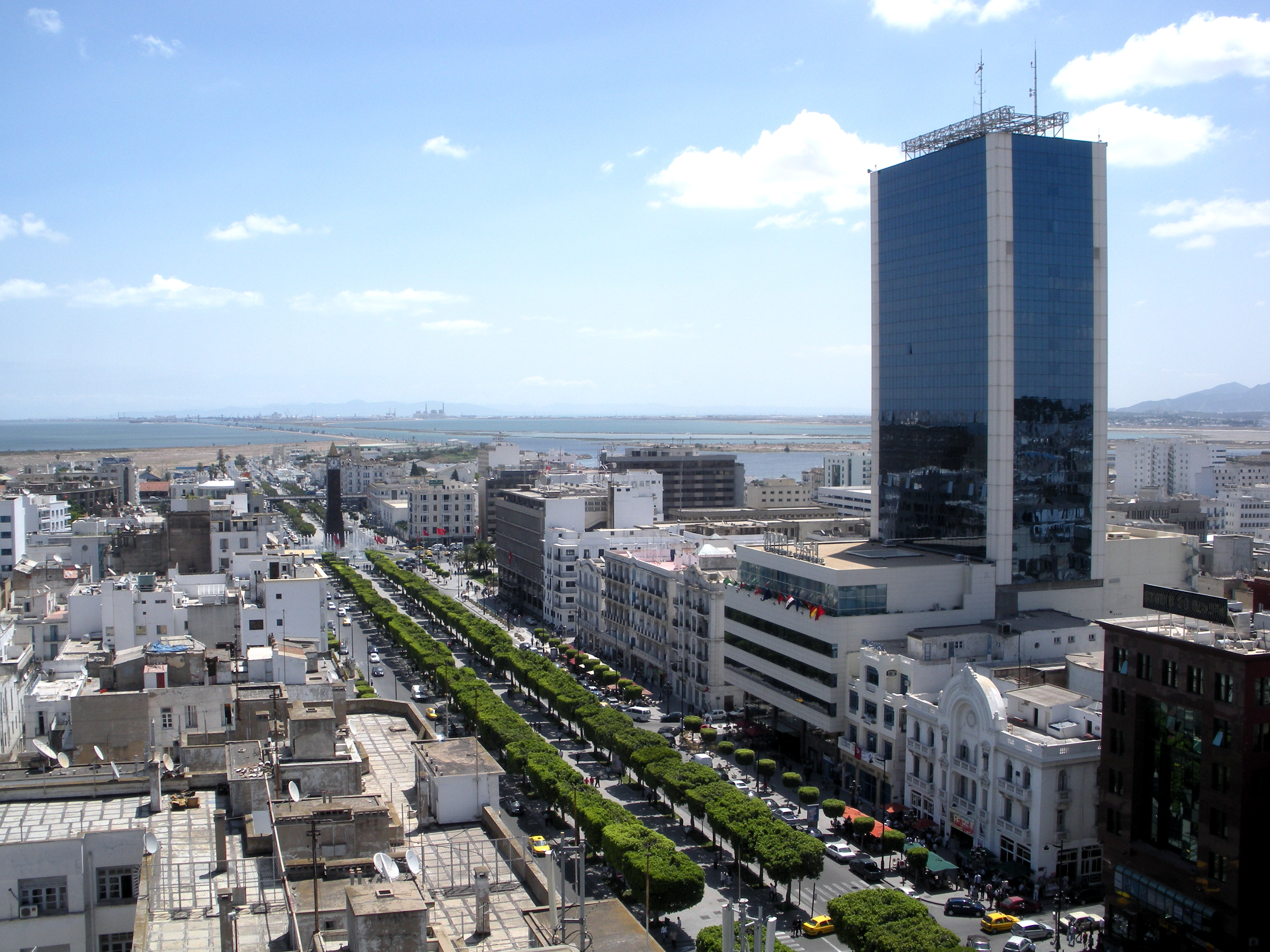
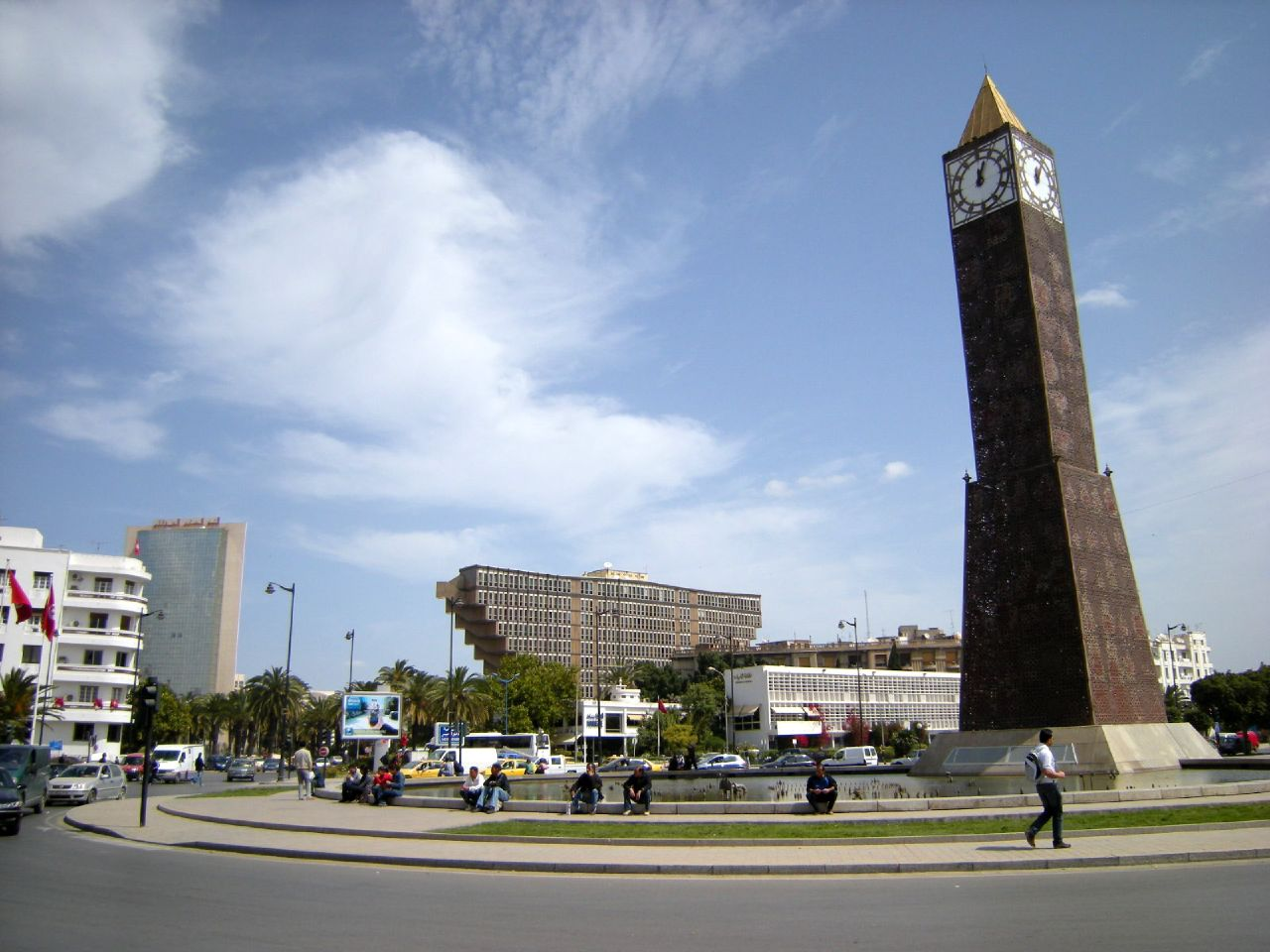
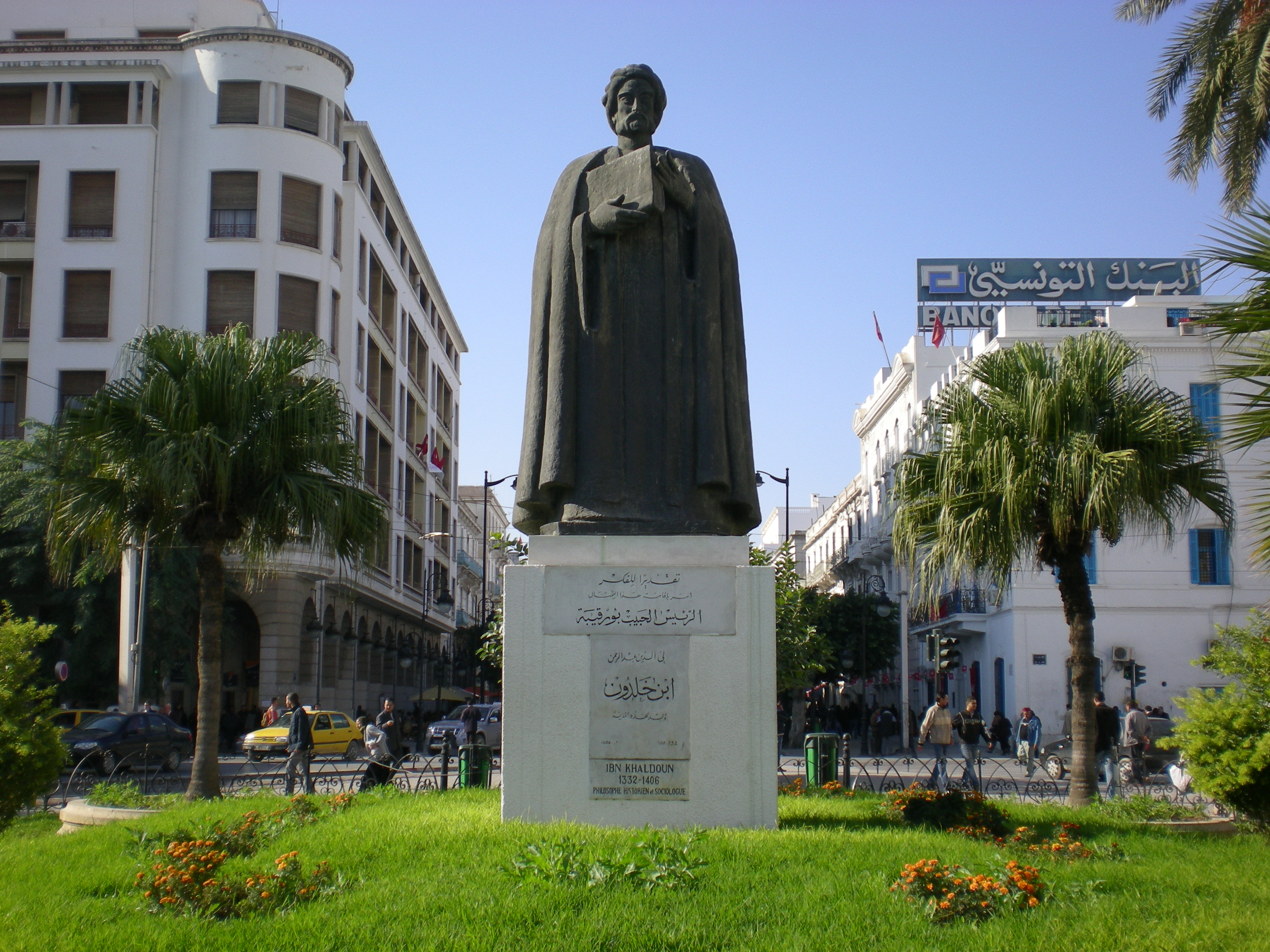
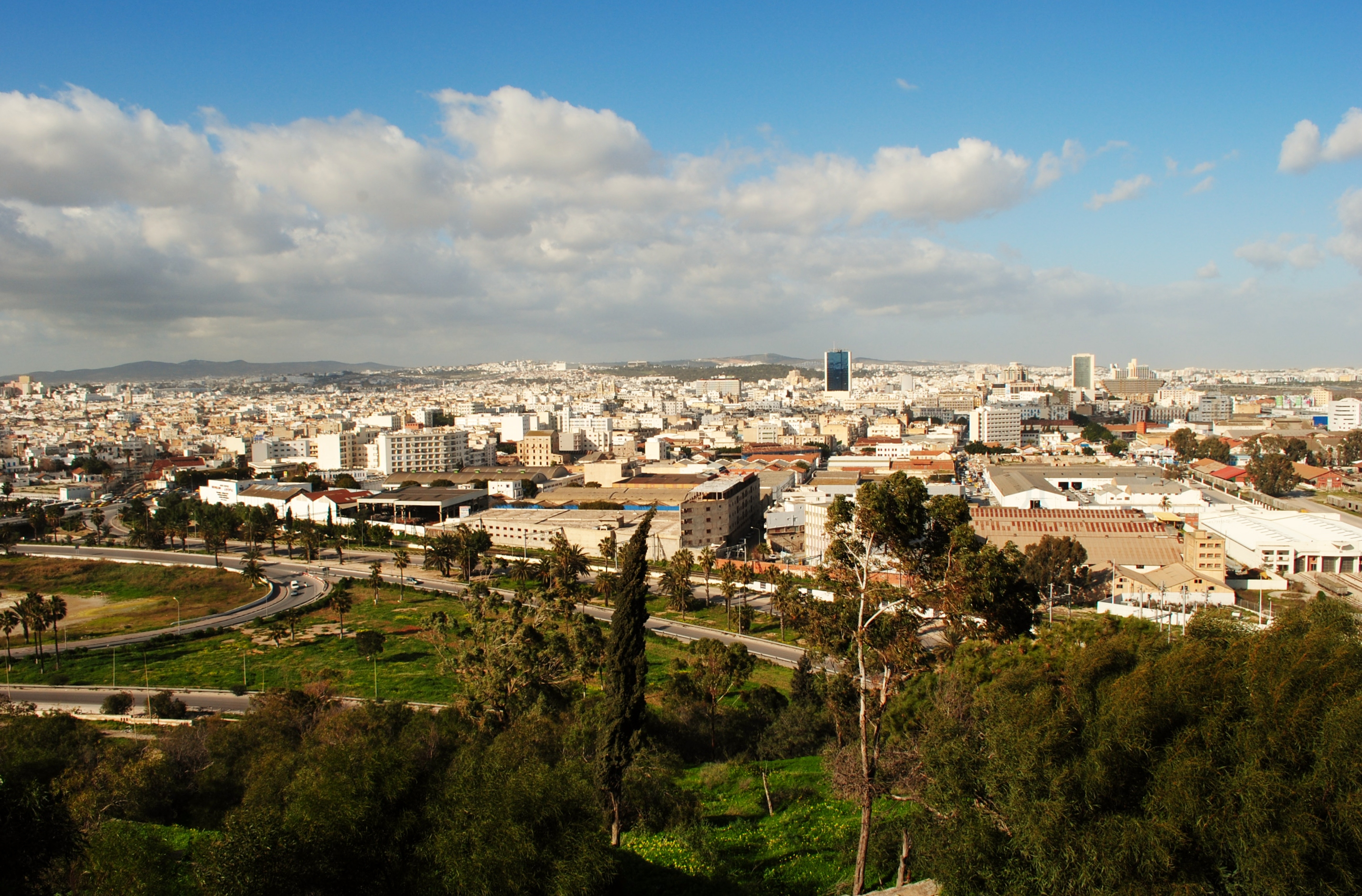
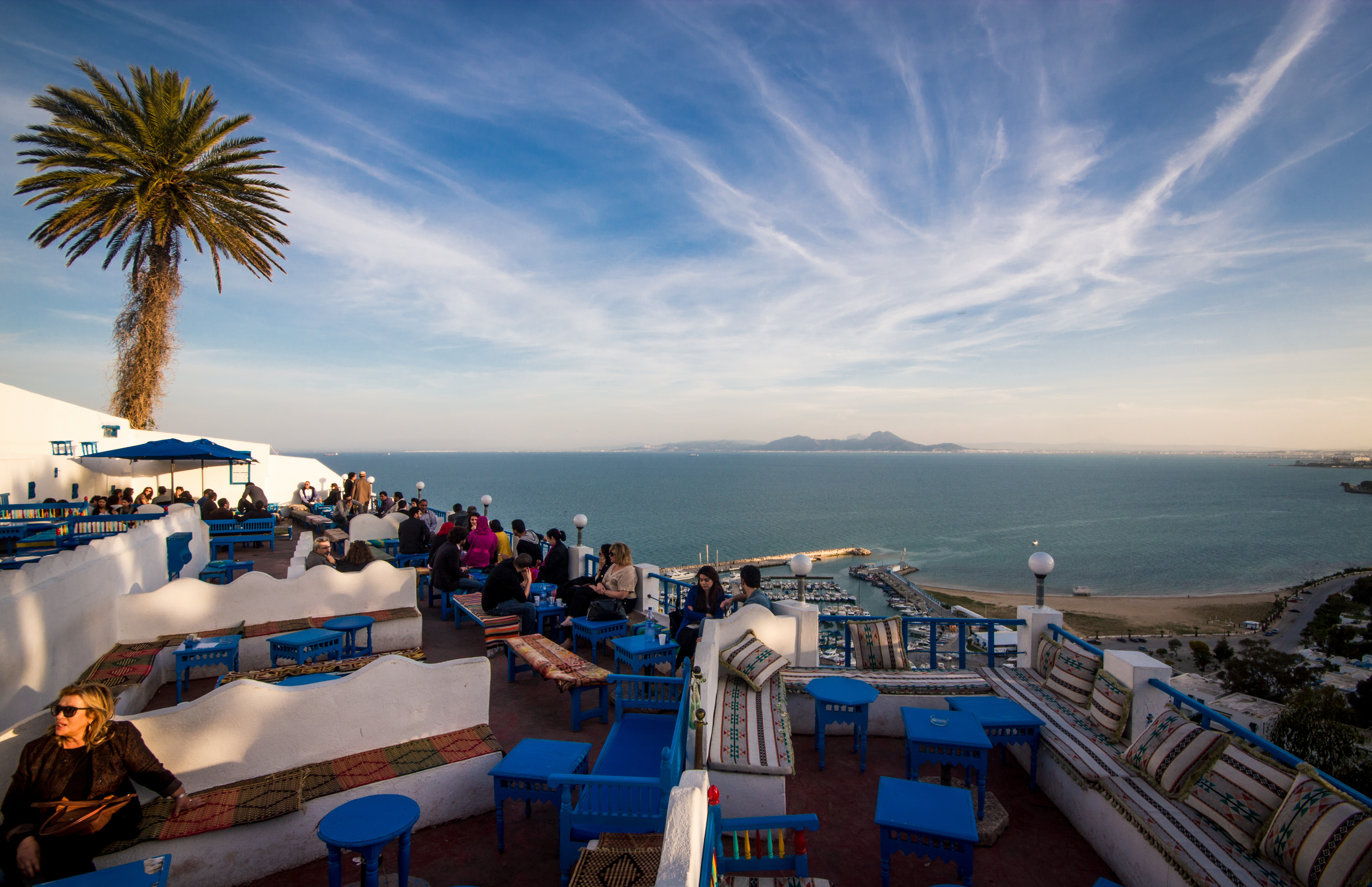
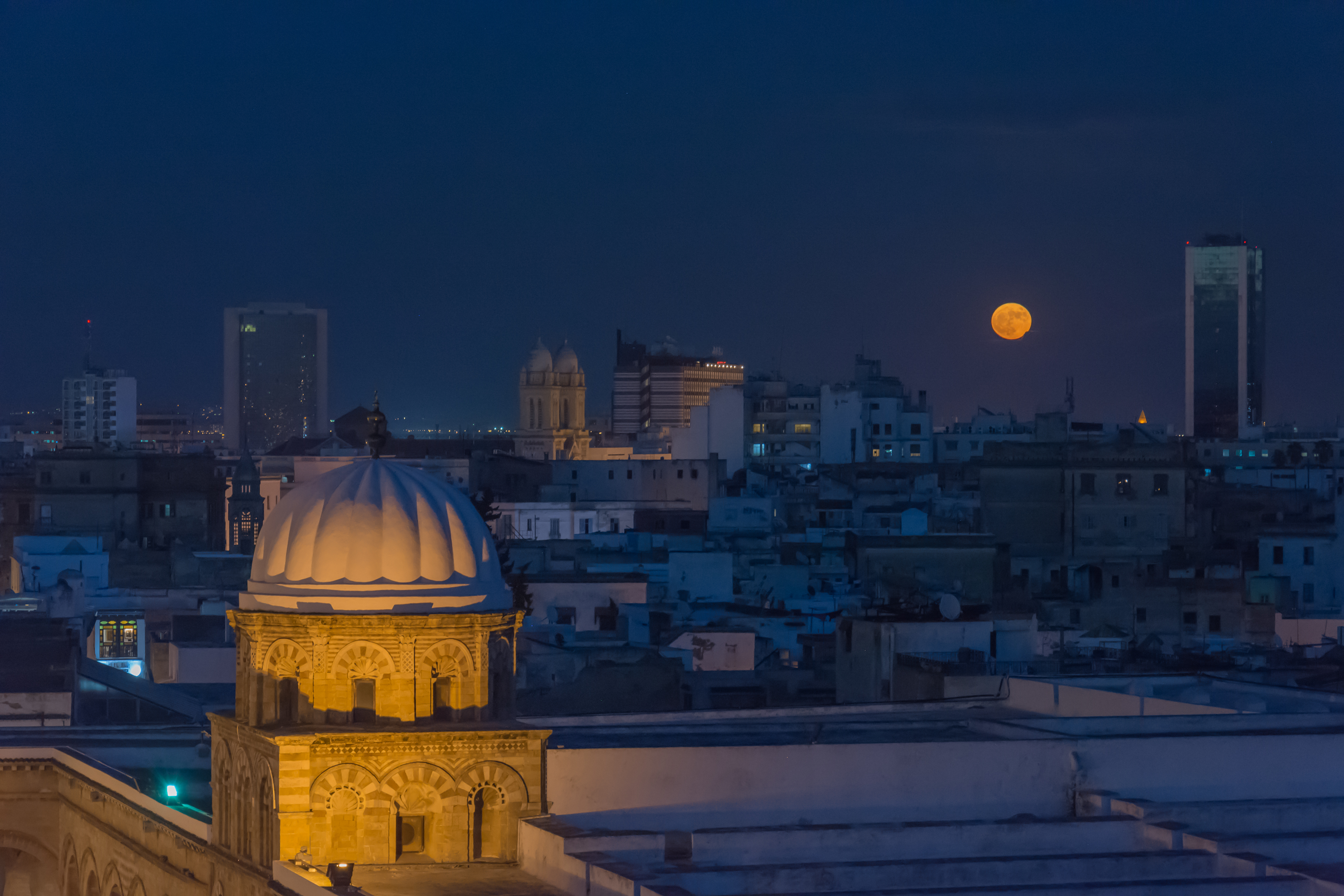
- From top, left to right: Avenue Habib Bourguiba, the statue of Ibn Khaldoun, view of Tunis from Sidi Belhassen mountain, view of Sidi Bou Said, view of Tunis at night.

- Flag Coat of arms

- Location in Tunisia and Africa Tunis (Mediterranean) Tunis (Africa)
- Coordinates: 36°48′23″N 10°10′54″E
- Country: Tunisia
- Governorate: Tunis Governorate
- Delegation(s): El Bab Bhar, Bab Souika, Cité El Khadra, Djebel Jelloud, El Kabaria, El Menzah, El Omrane, El Omrane Superieur, El Ouardia, Ettahrir, Ezzouhour, Hraïria, Medina, Séjoumi, Sidi El Bechir
- Established: 698 AD

Government
  - Mayor: Imed Boukhris (Independent)

Area
  - Capital city: 212 km^{2} (82 sq mi)
  - Metro: 2,668 km^{2} (1,030 sq mi)
- Highest elevation: 41 m (135 ft)
- Lowest elevation: 4 m (13 ft)

Population (2024-01-01)
  - Capital city: 693,210
  - Rank: 1st
  - Density: 5,794/km^{2} (15,010/sq mi)
  - Urban: 1,110,000
  - Metro: 2,912,818
- Demonym(s): Arabic: تونسي Tounsi; French: Tunisois

GDP (PPP, constant 2015 values)
  - Year: 2024
  - Total (Urban): $14.1 billion
  - Per capita: $12,500
- Time zone: UTC+01:00 (Central European Time)
  - Summer (DST): (Not Observed)
- Postal code: 1xxx, 2xxx
- Calling code: 71
- ISO 3166 code: TN-11, TN-12, TN-13 and TN-14
- geoTLD: .tn
- Website: Official website

Tunis (Arabic: تونس, Tūnis) is the capital and largest city of Tunisia. The greater metropolitan area of Tunis, often referred to as "Grand Tunis", has about 2,700,000 inhabitants. As of 2020, it was the third-largest city in the Maghreb region (after Casablanca and Algiers) and the fifteenth-largest in the Arab world.

Situated on the Gulf of Tunis, behind the Lake of Tunis and the port of La Goulette (Ḥalq il-Wād), the city extends along the coastal plain and the hills that surround it. At its core lies the Medina, a World Heritage Site. East of the Medina, through the Sea Gate (also known as the Bab el Bhar and the Porte de France), begins the modern part of the city called "Ville Nouvelle", traversed by the grand Avenue Habib Bourguiba (often referred to by media and travel guides as "the Tunisian Champs-Élysées"), where the colonial-era buildings provide a clear contrast to smaller, older structures. Further east by the sea lie the suburbs of Carthage, La Marsa, and Sidi Bou Said.

As the capital of the country, Tunis is the focus of Tunisian political and administrative life and also the center of the country's commercial and cultural activities.

== Etymology ==
Different explanations exist for the origin of the name Tunis. Some scholars relate it to the Carthaginian goddess Tanith ('Tanit or Tanut), as many ancient cities were named after patron deities. However, the placename is attested on Neo-Punic coins as 𐤕𐤅𐤍𐤑𐤍 TWNṢN, which is spelled differently from 𐤕𐤉𐤍𐤕 TYNT ("Tanit"), making any connection between the two impossible. Some scholars claim that it originated from Tynes, which was mentioned by Diodorus Siculus and Polybius in the course of descriptions of a location resembling present-day Al-Kasbah, Tunis's old Berber village.

Another possibility is that it was derived from the Berber verbal root ens which means "to lie down" or "to pass the night". The term Tunis can possibly mean "camp at night", "camp", or "stop", or may have referred to as "the last stop before Carthage" by people who were journeying to Carthage by land. There are also some mentions in ancient Roman sources of such names of nearby towns as Thinisa in Numidia (now El Kala), Thunusuda (now Sidi-Meskin), Thinissut (now Bir Bouregba), Thunisa (now Ras Jebel) and Cartennae (now Ténès). As all of these Berber villages were situated on Roman roads, they undoubtedly served as rest-stations or stops.

== History ==
=== Carthage and early settlements ===
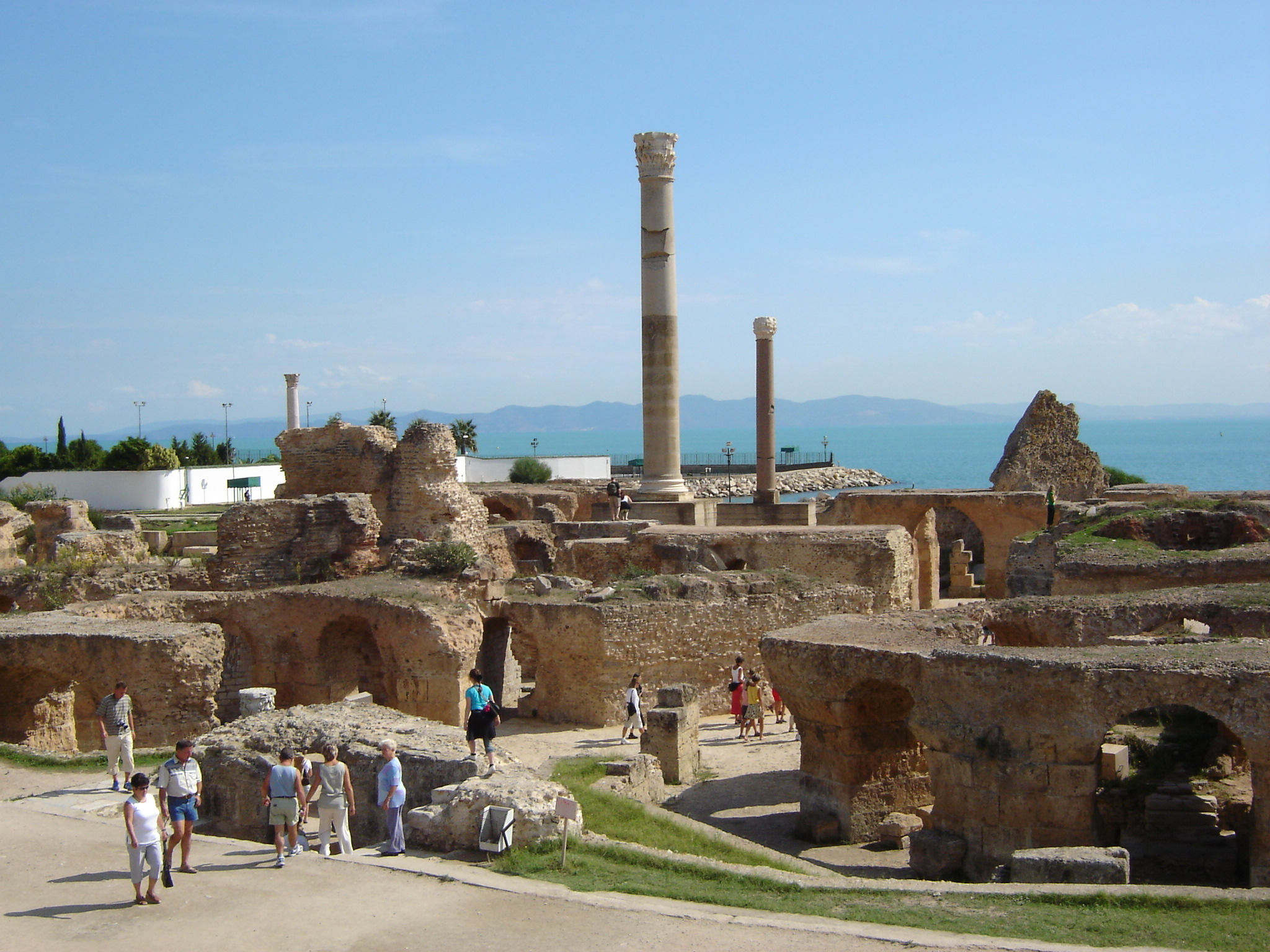
Ruins of the Roman Baths of Antoninus in Carthage.

The historical study of Carthage is difficult. Because its culture and records were destroyed by the Romans at the end of the Third Punic War, very few Carthaginian primary historical sources survive. While there are a few ancient translations of Punic texts into Greek and Latin, as well as inscriptions on monuments and buildings discovered in Northwest Africa, the main sources are Greek and Roman historians, including Livy, Polybius, Appian, Cornelius Nepos, Silius Italicus, Plutarch, Dio Cassius, and Herodotus. These writers belonged to peoples in competition, and often in conflict, with Carthage. Greek cities contended with Carthage over Sicily, and the Romans fought three wars against Carthage. Not surprisingly, their accounts of Carthage are extremely hostile; while there were a few Greek authors who took a favourable view, these works have been lost. The area was originally a Berber settlement. The existence of settlements in and around the area of Tunis is attested by sources dating from the 4th century BC. Situated on a hill, its location served as an excellent point from which the comings and goings of naval and caravan traffic to and from Carthage could be observed. It was one of the first towns in the region to fall under Carthaginian control, and in the centuries that followed the settlement was mentioned in the military histories associated with Carthage. Thus, during Agathocles' expedition, which landed at Cape Bon in 310 BC, the town changed hands on various occasions.

During the Mercenary War, it is possible that the town served as a center for the native population of the area, and that its population was mainly composed of peasants, fishermen, and craftsmen. Compared to the ancient ruins of Carthage, the town's ancient ruins are not as large. According to Strabo, it was destroyed by the Romans in 146 BC during the Third Punic War. Both the town and Carthage were destroyed; the former, however, was rebuilt first under the rule of Augustus and became an important town under Roman control and the center of a booming agricultural industry. The township is mentioned as Thuni in the Tabula Peutingeriana. In the system of Roman roads for the Roman province of Africa, the town had the title of mutatio ("way station, resting place"). The borough, increasingly Romanized, was also eventually Christianized and became the seat of a bishop. However, it remained modestly sized compared to Carthage during this time.

=== Foundation and early Islamic period ===
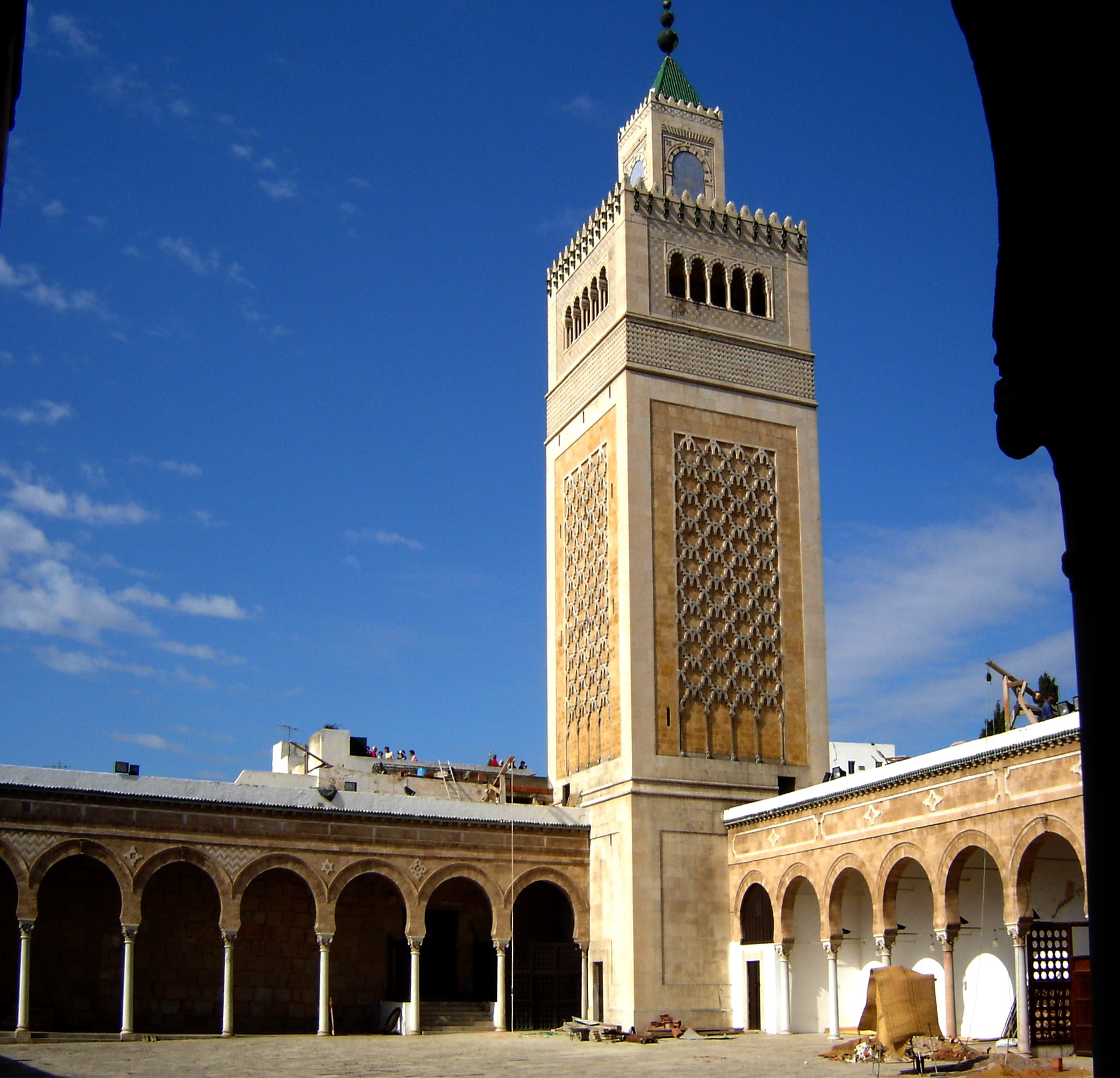
Courtyard of Zaytuna Mosque, founded in the late 7th century by the Umayyad dynasty

In the late 7th century, the Arab Muslims conquered the region, and in 698 a commune and a mosque were established at the outskirts of the ancient ruins, founded by Hassan ibn al-Nu'man, which would become the city of Tunis and the Zaytuna Mosque. The Medina of Tunis, the oldest section of the city, dates from this period, during which the region was conquered by the Umayyad Caliphate. The city had the natural advantage of coastal access, via the Mediterranean, to the major ports of southern Europe. Early on, Tunis played a military role; the Umayyads recognized the strategic importance of its proximity to the Strait of Sicily, with a dockyard built upon the founding of the city by order of Caliph Abd al-Malik. From the beginning of the 8th century, Tunis was the administrative center of the area: it became the Umayyad, and later the Abbasids' naval base in the western Mediterranean Sea, and took on considerable military importance. Under the Aghlabids, the city gained significance and benefited from economic improvements and became one of the most important in the caliphate, and was briefly the national capital from the end of the reign of Ibrahim II, from 902 until 909, when control over Ifriqiya was handed to the newly founded Fatimid Caliphate.

Local opposition to the authorities began to intensify in September 945, when Kharijite insurgents occupied Tunis, resulting in general pillaging. With the rise of the Fatimid-viceregal Zirid dynasty the Sunni population tolerated Shi'ite rule less and less, and carried out massacres against the Shi'ite community. In 1048 the Zirid ruler Al-Muizz ibn Badis rejected his city's obedience to the Fatimids and re-established Sunni rites throughout all of Ifriqiya. This decision infuriated the Fatimid Caliph Al-Mustansir Billah. To punish the Zirids, he unleashed the Banu Hilal Arab tribe on Ifriqiya; a large part of the country was set to the torch, the Zirid capital Kairouan was razed in 1057, and only a few coastal towns, including Tunis and Mahdia, escaped destruction.

Exposed to violence from the hostile tribes that settled around the city, the population of Tunis repudiated the authority of the Zirids and swore allegiance to the Hammadid prince El Nacer ibn Alennas, who was based in Béjaïa, in 1059. The governor appointed by Béjaïa, having reestablished order in the country, did not hesitate to free himself from the Hammadids to found the Khurasanid dynasty with Tunis as its capital. This small independent kingdom picked up the threads of trade and commerce with other nations and brought the region back to peace and prosperity.

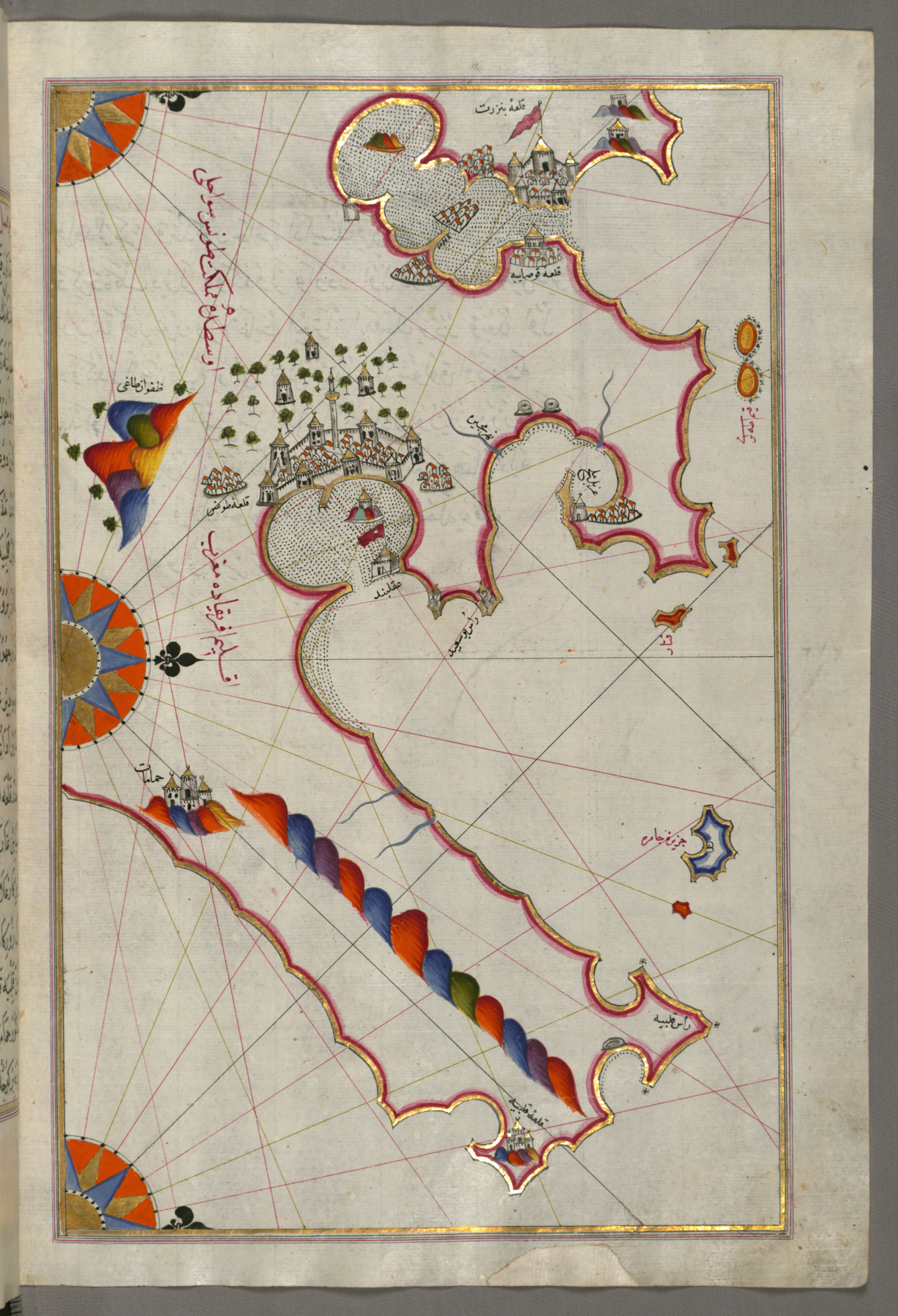
Historic map of Tunis by Piri Reis. The Walters Art Museum.

=== New capital of Tunisia ===
In 1159, the Almohad 'Abd al-Mu'min took Tunis, overthrew the last Khurasanid leader, and installed a new government in the kasbah of Tunis. The Almohad conquest marked the beginning of the dominance of the city in Tunisia. Having previously played a minor role behind Kairouan and Mahdia, Tunis was promoted to the rank of provincial capital.

In 1228, Governor Abu Zakariya seized power and, a year later, took the title of Emir and founded the Hafsid dynasty. The city became the capital of a Hafsid kingdom stretching towards Tripoli and Fez. Walls were built to protect the emerging principal town of the kingdom, surrounding the medina, the kasbah, and the new suburbs of Tunis. In 1270 the city was taken briefly by Louis IX of France, who was hoping to convert the Hafsid sovereign to Christianity. King Louis easily captured Carthage, but his army soon fell victim to an outbreak of dysentery. Louis himself died before the walls of the capital and his army were forced out. At the same time, driven by the reconquest of Spain, the first Andalusian Muslims and Jews arrived in Tunis and would become of importance to the economic prosperity of the Hafsid capital and the development of its intellectual life.

During the Almohad and Hafsid periods, Tunis was one of the richest and grandest cities in the Islamic world, with a population of about 100,000. Like the Almohads, the Hafsids maintained Christian mercenaries who lived in a neighbourhood closed off with a gate near the Hafsid palace complex. They worshipped in a church dedicated to Saint Francis of Assisi which visitors described as "very beautiful and great" and which was allowed to ring the bell, a practice forbidden by the so-called Pact of Umar and a privilege not granted to the Genoese and Venetian merchants who maintained chapels in their merchant quarters. When Jean Adorno visited Tunis in 1470, he described these Christians as assimilated culturally and linguistically into Tunisian society, though they remained Christians and would sing in Latin during mass.

During this period, one of the famous travelers to Tunis was Ibn Battuta. In his travel account, when Ibn Battuta and his group arrived in Tunis, the population of the city came out to meet him and the other members of his party. They all greeted them and were very curious, many were asking questions, however, no one in Tunis personally greeted Ibn Battuta, greatly upsetting him. He felt very lonely and could not hold back the tears coming from his eyes. This went on for a while until one of the pilgrims realized he was upset, he went up and greeted and talked to Ibn Battuta until he entered the city. At the time, the Sultan of Tunis was Abu Yahya and during Ibn Battuta's stay, the Festival of the Breaking of the Fast was taking place. The people in the city assembled in large numbers to celebrate the festival, in extravagant and most luxurious outfits. Abu Yahya arrived on horseback, where all of his relatives joined him. After the performance, the people returned to their homes.

=== Spanish occupation and Ottoman control ===
The Ottoman Empire took nominal control of Tunis in 1534 when Hayreddin Barbarossa captured it from the Hafsid Sultan Mulai Hassan, who fled to the court of Charles V, Holy Roman Emperor and King of Spain. Charles, suffering losses from the corsairs operating out of Djerba, Tunis, and Algiers, agreed to reinstate Mulai Hassan in exchange for his acceptance of Spanish suzerainty. A naval expedition led by Charles himself was dispatched in 1535, and the city was recaptured. The victory against the corsairs is recorded in a tapestry at the Royal Palace of Madrid. The Spanish governor of La Goulette, Luis Pérez de Vargas, fortified the island of Chikly in the lake of Tunis to strengthen the city's defenses between 1546 and 1550.

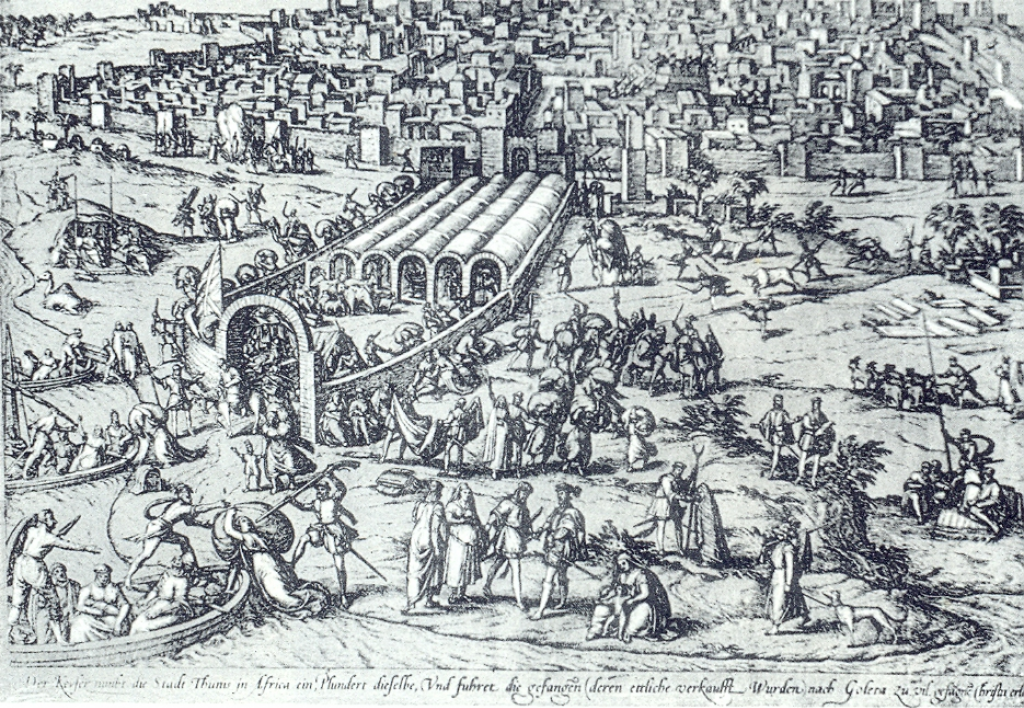
Entry of Charles V into Tunis in 1535

The Ottoman Uluç Ali Reis, at the head of an army of janissaries and Kabyles, retook Tunis in 1569. However, following the Battle of Lepanto in 1571, the Spanish under John of Austria succeeded in retaking the city and re-establishing the Hafsid sovereign in October 1573. Following these conflicts, the city finally fell into Ottoman hands in August 1574. Having become an Ottoman province governed by a Pasha who was appointed by the Sultan based in Constantinople, the country attained a degree of autonomy. After 1591, the Ottoman governors (Beys) were relatively independent, and both piracy and trade continued to flourish. Under the rule of deys and beys, the capital sprang into new life. Its population grew by additions from various ethnicities, among which were Moorish refugees from Spain, and economic activities diversified. To traditional industry and trade with distant lands was added the activity of the Barbary pirates, then in their golden age. Profits obtained from the trade in Christian slaves allowed the rulers to build sumptuous structures that revived the architectural heritage of the Middle Ages.

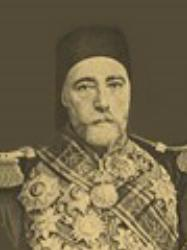
Mustapha Khaznadar, Prime Minister of Tunis from 1837 to 1873. and one of the most influential persons in modern Tunisian history.

In April 1655 the English admiral Robert Blake was sent to the Mediterranean to extract compensation from states that had been attacking English shipping. Only the Bey of Tunis refused to comply, with the result that Blake's fifteen ships attacked the Bey's arsenal at Porto Farina (Ghar el Melh), destroying nine Algerian ships and two shore batteries, the first time in naval warfare that shore batteries had been eliminated without landing men ashore.

At the beginning of the 18th century, Tunisia entered into a new period in its history with the advent of the Husainid dynasty. Successive Husainid rulers made great progress in developing the city and its buildings. During this period, the city prospered as a center of commerce. Taking advantage of divisions within the ruling house, Algerians captured Tunis in 1756 and put the country under supervision. Hammouda Bey faced bombardment by the Venetian fleet, and the city experienced a rebellion in 1811. Under the reign of Hussein Bey II, naval defeats by the British (1826) and French (1827) saw the French become increasingly active in the city and in the economy.

Various sources estimate the 19th-century population to have ranged from 90,000 to 110,000 inhabitants. During the later 19th century, Tunis became increasingly populated by Europeans, particularly the French, and immigration dramatically increased the size of the city. This resulted in the first demolition of the old city walls, from 1860, to accommodate growth in the suburbs. The city spilled outside the area of the earlier town and the banks of the lake, and the new districts were modernized with running water (1860), lighting gas (1872), roads, waste collection (1873), and communication with adjacent suburbs and the city center. The crafts and traditional trades declined somewhat, as the newcomers increased trade with Europe, introducing the first modern industries and new forms of urban life.

=== Development under the French protectorate ===
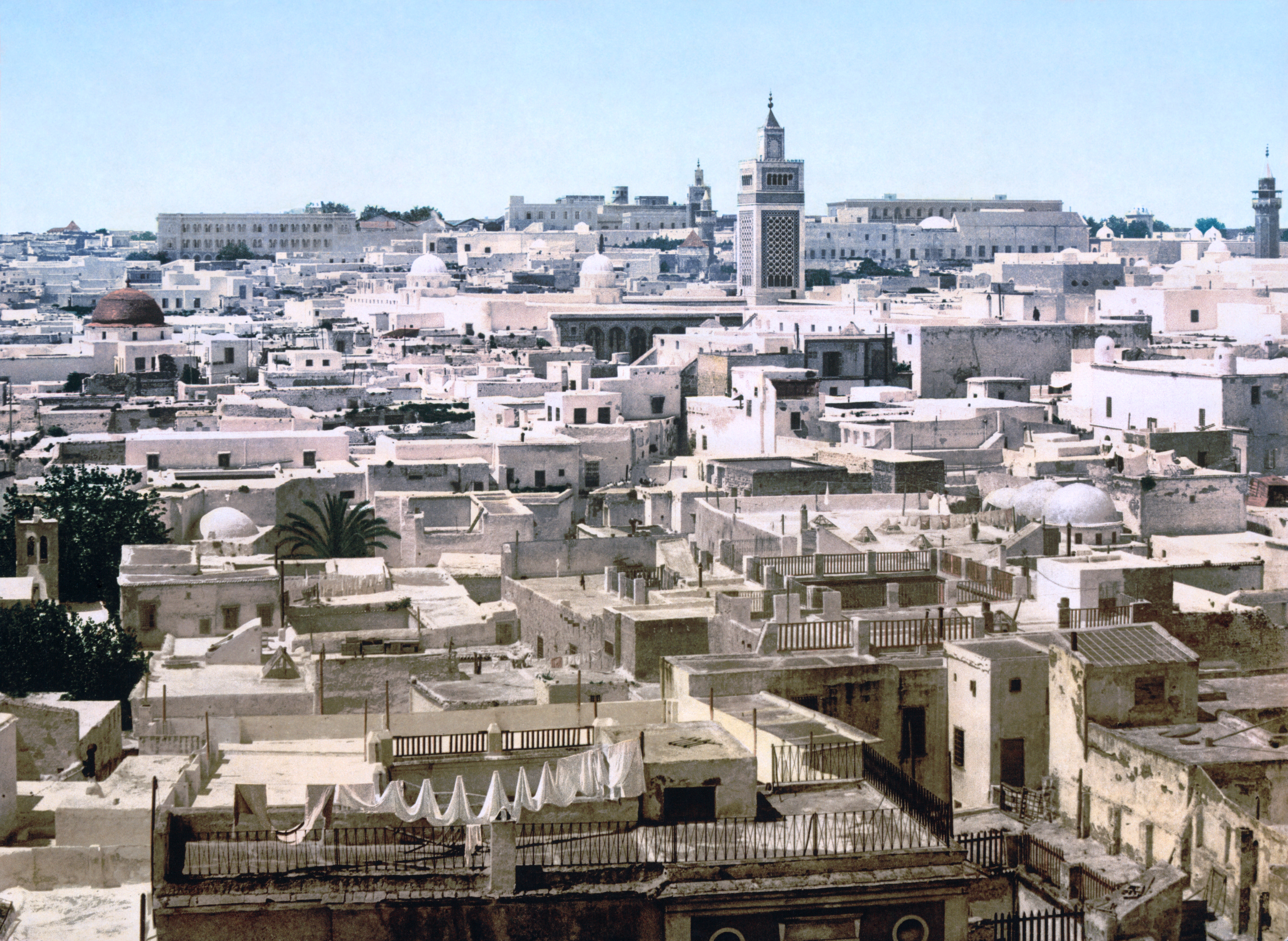
View of Tunis c. 1890–1900. Zaytuna Mosque is slightly right of center.

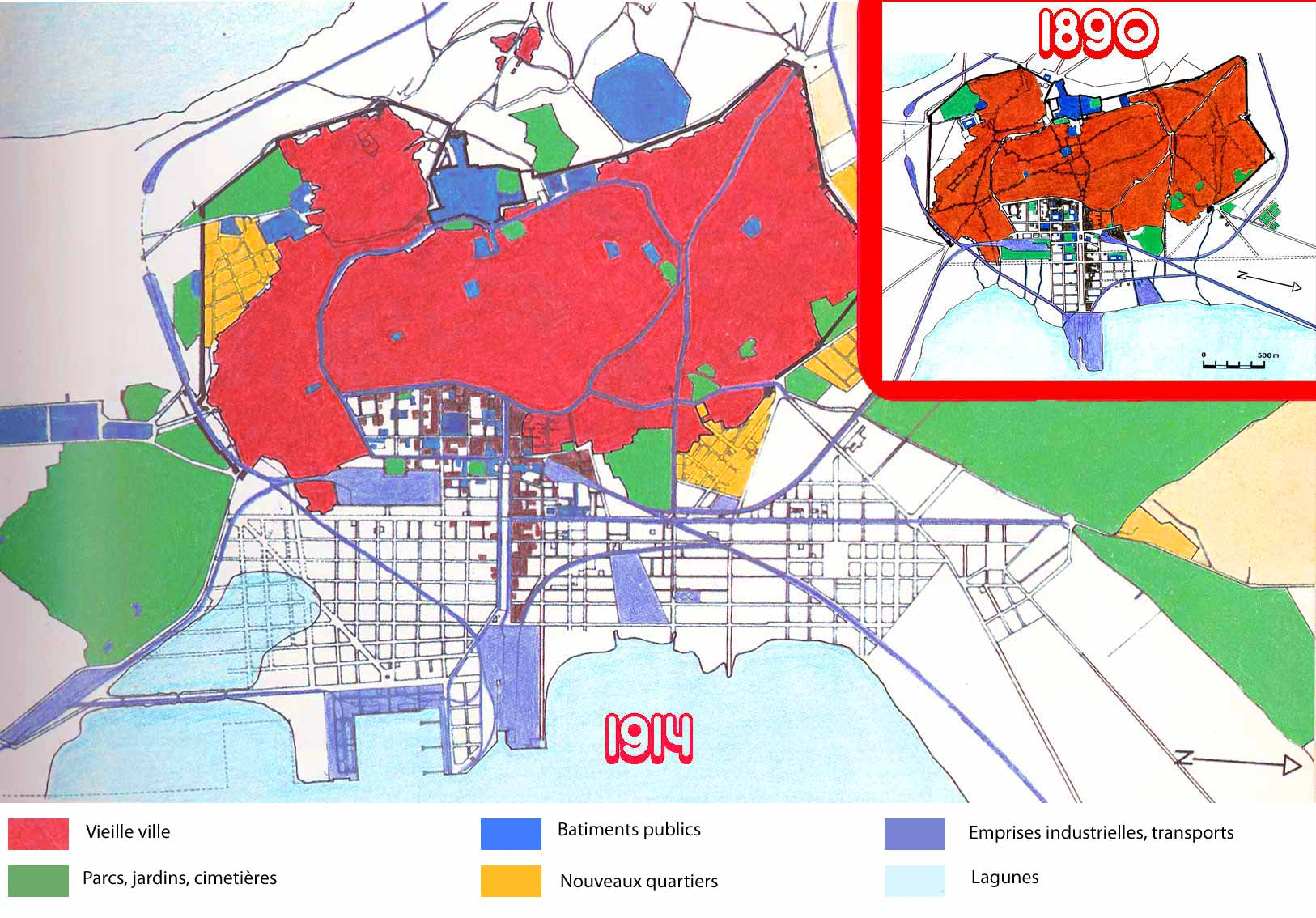
Urban evolution between 1890 and 1914

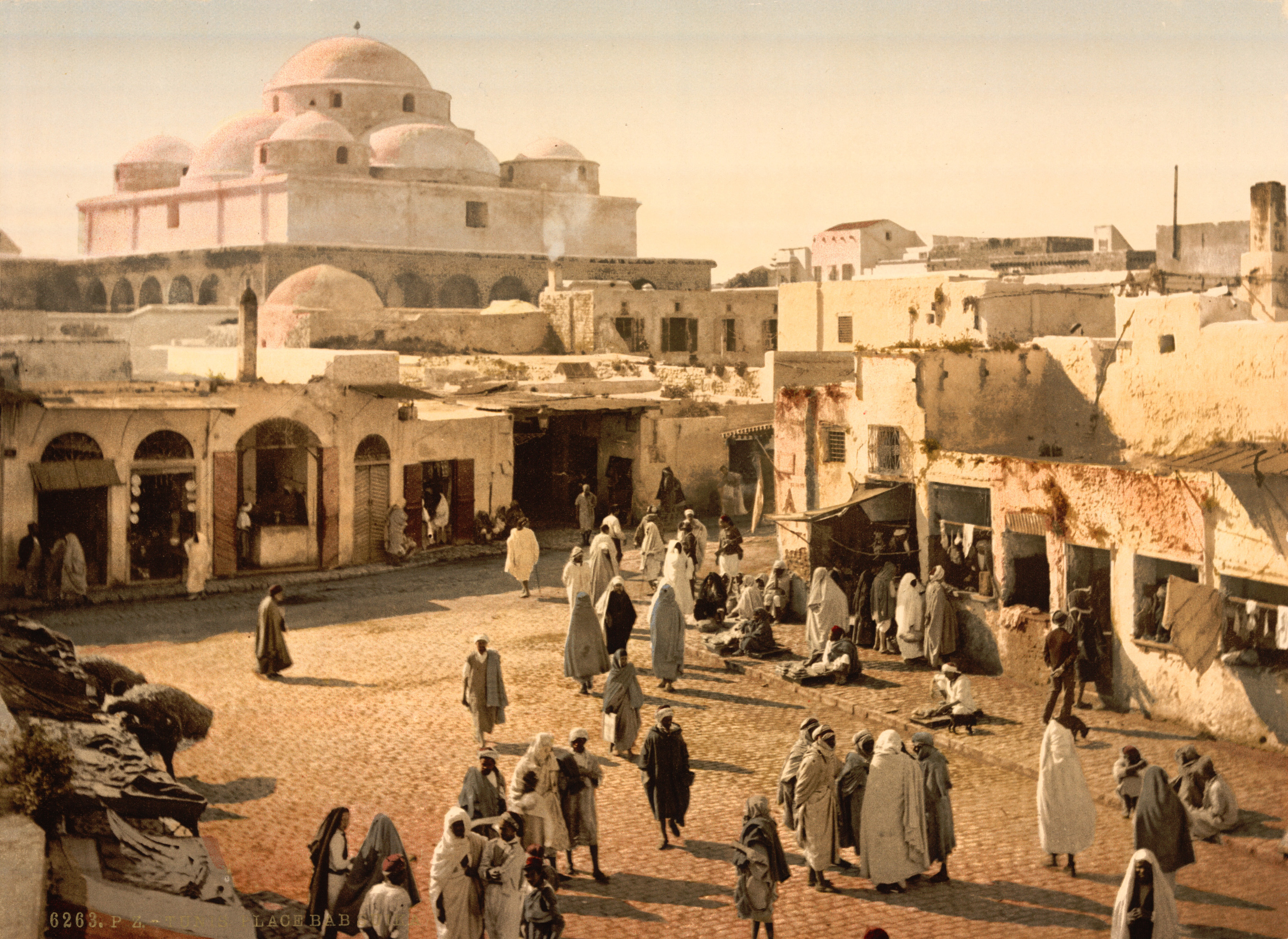
Bab Souika Square in Tunis, ca. 1899

The creation of the French protectorate in 1881 was a turning point in Tunis's history, leading to rapid redevelopment of the city in the span of two to three decades. The city quickly spread out of its fortifications: it divided into a traditional Arab-populated old city, and a new city populated by immigrants, with a different structure from that of the traditional medina. Tunis also benefited from the French construction of a water supply, natural gas and electricity networks, public transport services, and other public infrastructure.

Under French rule, a substantial number of Europeans settled (like the Tunisian Italians); half of the population was European in origin. The city expanded and created new boulevards and neighborhoods.

Tunis was quiet during the First World War. After the war, the city faced new transformations as the modern portion grew in importance and extended its network of boulevards and streets in all directions. In addition, a series of satellite cities emerged on the urban rim and encroached on the municipality of Tunis proper. In the economic sphere, commercial activities expanded and diversified as modern industries continued to grow, while traditional industry continued to decline.

During World War II, Tunis was held by Axis forces from November 1942 to May 1943. It was their last base in Africa, as they retreated towards Sicily after being surrounded by Allied forces from Algeria to the west and from Libya to the east. On 7 May 1943, at about 15:30 in the afternoon, Tunis fell to troops of British 1st Army and the U.S. 1st Army, which had defeated the German 5th Panzer Army guarding the city. At midday on 20 May 1943, the Allies held a victory parade on Avenue Maréchal Galliéni, and Avenue Jules Ferry, to signal the end of fighting in North Africa.

Having succeeded in driving the Axis powers out of Tunisia, the Allies used Tunis as a base of operations from which to stage amphibious assaults first against the island of Pantelleria, and then Sicily, and finally the mainland of Italy.

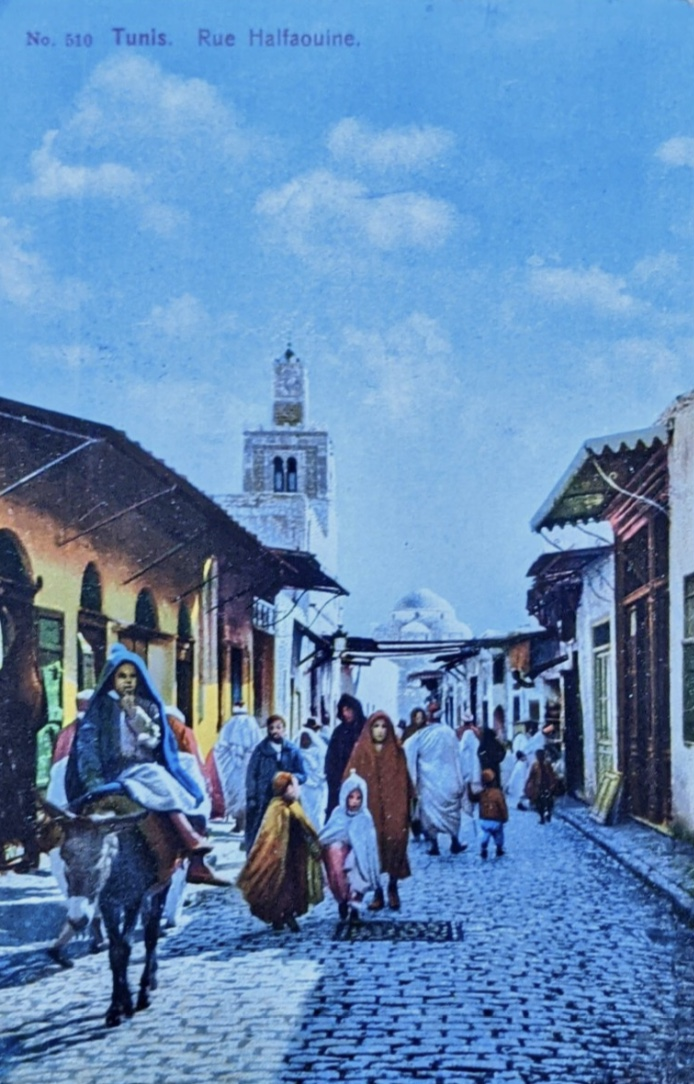
Rue Halfaouine, Tunis, c. 1911

=== Growth since independence ===
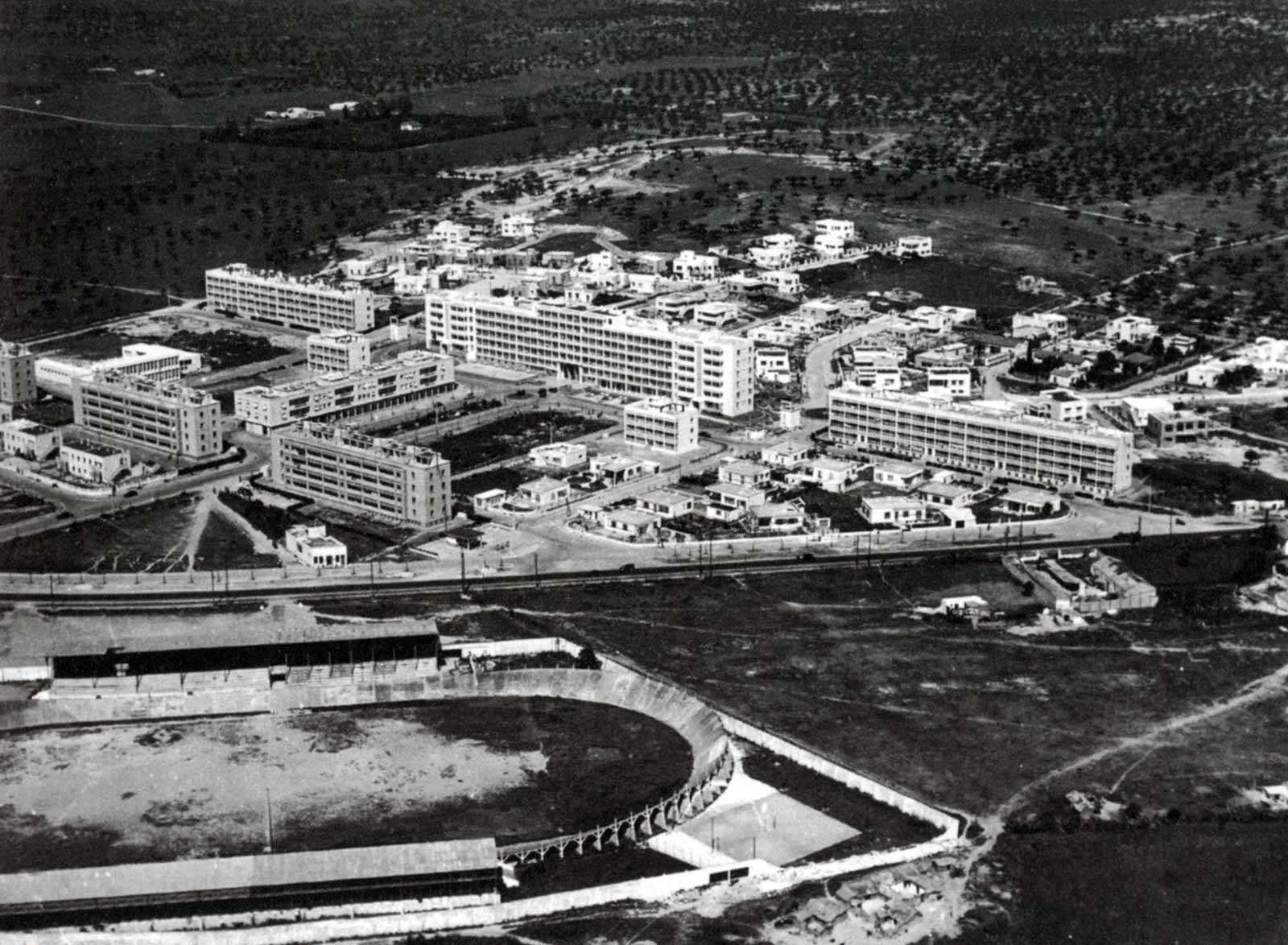
Extension of the city in the 1950s with the district of El Menzah

After independence in 1956, Tunis consolidated its role as the capital, first with the establishment of a constitution stating that the Chamber of Deputies and the Presidency of the Republic must have their headquarters in Tunis and its suburbs. In a very short time, the colonial city transformed rapidly. As the city has grown and native Tunisians gradually began to replace the extensive European population, the conflict between the Arab city and the European city has gradually decreased with the arabization of the population.

Because of population pressure and the rate of migration to the capital, the city continued to grow, even with the creation of new districts in the suburbs. Old buildings have gradually been renovated and upgraded. New buildings have come to influence the urban landscape. At the same time, an active policy of industrialization is developing the municipal economy. The Medina of Tunis has been a UNESCO World Heritage Site since 1979.

The Arab League represents 22 Arab nations. It transferred its headquarters to Tunis in 1979 because of Egypt's peace with Israel. The Arab League returned to Egypt in 1990.

The Palestine Liberation Organization also had its headquarters in Tunis, from 1982 to 2003. In 1985, the PLO's headquarters was bombed by Israeli Air Force F-15s, killing approximately 60 people.

=== 21st century ===
Many protests took place during the Arab Spring of 2011–12.

On 18 March 2015, two gunmen attacked the Bardo National Museum and held hostages. Twenty civilians and one policeman were killed in the attack, while around 50 others were injured. Five Japanese, two Colombians, and visitors from Italy, Poland, and Spain were among the dead. Both gunmen were killed by Tunisian police. The incident has been treated as a terrorist attack.

On July 25, 2025, hundreds of Tunisians protested in Tunis against incumbent president Kais Saied's alleged authoritarian leadership. Protesters marched under slogans such as “The Republic is a large prison” and demanded the release of jailed opposition leaders, journalists, and activists. Saied has ruled by decree ever since 2021 after dissolving the parliament. The protesters called this move a “coup.” They chanted, “No fear, no terror… streets belong to the people,” and “the people want the fall of the regime.” The protesters also carried with them a cage they said represented the political system in Tunisia.

== Geography ==
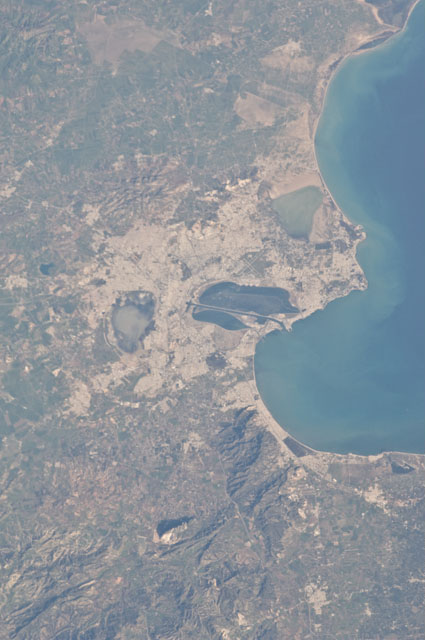
Aerial view of Tunis.

Tunis is located in north-eastern Tunisia on the Lake of Tunis, and is connected to the Mediterranean sea's Gulf of Tunis by a canal which terminates at the port of La Goulette/Halq al Wadi. The ancient city of Carthage is located just north of Tunis along the coastal part. The city is further South than Sicily, on a similar latitude to Cádiz, an ancient city in Southern Spain with ties to the Phoenician and Carthaginian civilizations.

The city of Tunis is built on a hill slope down to the lake of Tunis. These hills contain places such as Notre-Dame de Tunis, Ras Tabia, La Rabta, La Kasbah, Montfleury, and La Manoubia with altitudes just above 50 metres (160 feet). The city is located at the crossroads of a narrow strip of land between Lake Tunis and Séjoumi. The isthmus between them is what geologists call the "Tunis dome", which includes hills of limestone and sediments. It forms a natural bridge and since ancient times several major roads linking to Egypt and elsewhere in Tunisia have branched out from it. The roads also connect with Carthage, emphasizing its political and economic importance not only in Tunisia but more widely in North Africa and the Mediterranean Sea in ancient times.

The Greater Tunis area has an area of 300,000 hectares (1,200 sq mi; 3,000 km^{2}), 10% of which are urbanized, the rest being shared between bodies of water (20,000 hectares (77 sq mi; 200 km^{2}) of lakes or lagoons) and agricultural or natural land (250,000 hectares (970 sq mi; 2,500 km^{2})). However, urban growth, which is estimated to be increasing by 500 hectares per year, is gradually changing the landscape with urban sprawl.

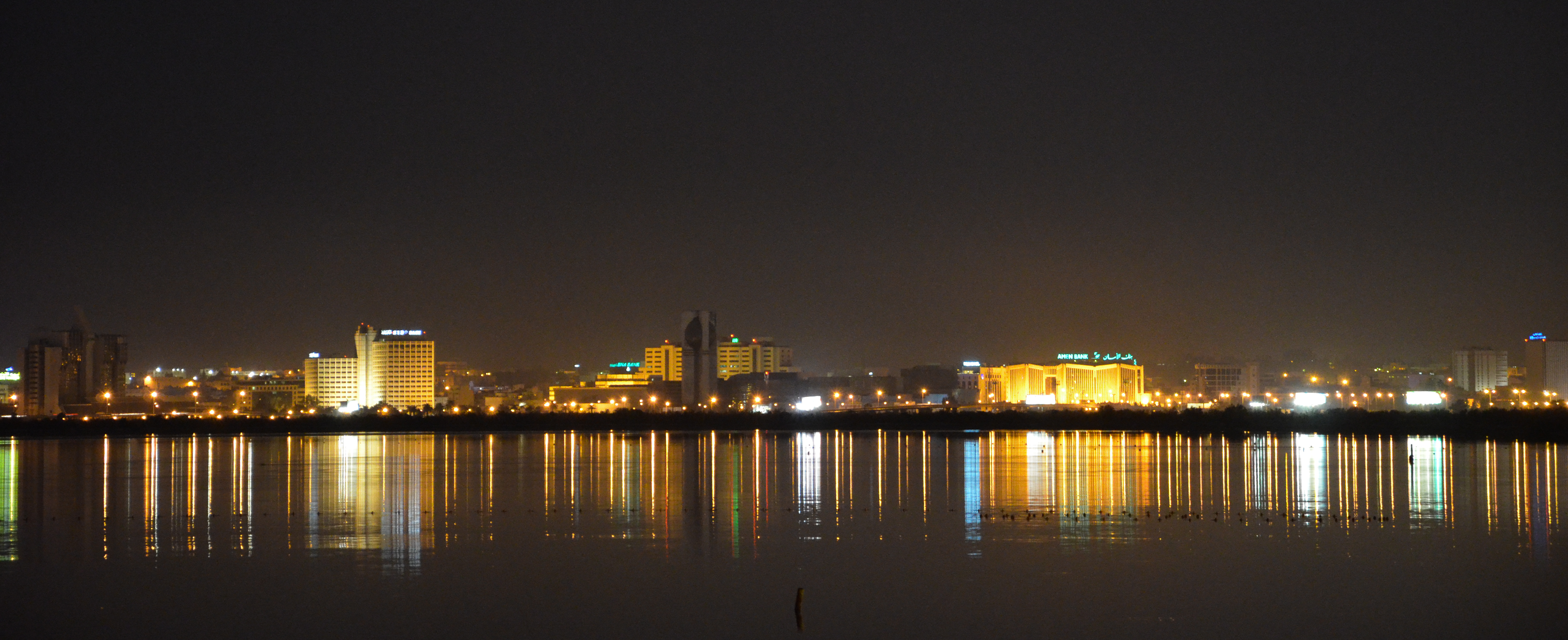
Panorama of Tunis at night

=== Suburbs ===
Municipality	Population (2004)
Ettadhamen-Mnihla	118,487
Ariana	97,687
La Soukra	89,151
El Mourouj	81,986
La Marsa	77,890
Douar Hicher	75,844
Ben Arous	74,932
Mohamedia-Fouchana	74,620
Le Bardo	70,244
Le Kram	58,152
Oued Ellil	47,614
Radès	44,857
Raoued	53,911
Hammam Lif	38,401
La Goulette	28,407
Carthage	28,407
La Manouba	26,666
Mornag	26,406
Djedeida	24,746
Den Den	24,732
Tebourba	24,175
Mégrine	24,031
Kalâat el-Andalous	15,313
Mornaguia	13,382
Sidi Thabet	8,909
Sidi Bou Saïd	4,793
El Battan	5,761
Borj El Amri	5,556
Total	1,265,060
Sources: National Institute of Statistics

After World War II, suburbs began to rapidly spring up on the outskirts of Tunis. These form a large percentage of the population of the Tunis metropolitan area. It grew from 27% of the total population in 1956, to 37% in 1975 and 50% in 2006.

=== Climate ===
Tunis has a hot semi-arid climate (Köppen climate classification BSh) bordering a hot-summer Mediterranean climate (Csa), characterized by hot and dry, prolonged summers and mild winters with moderate rainfall. The local climate is also affected somewhat by the latitude of the city, the moderating influence of the Mediterranean sea, and the terrain of the hills.

Winter is the wettest season of the year, when more than a third of the annual rainfall falls during this period, raining on average every two or three days. The sun may still increase the temperature from 7 °C (45 °F) in the morning to 16 °C (61 °F) in the afternoon on average during the winter. Frosts are rare. The lowest temperature of −2.0 °C (28.4 °F) was recorded on 18 January 1979. In spring, rainfall declines by half. The sunshine becomes dominant in May when it reaches 10 hours a day on average. In March temperatures may vary between 8 and 18 °C (46 and 64 °F), and between 13 and 24 °C (55 and 75 °F) in May. However, it is common for temperatures to soar even as early as April with record temperatures reaching 40 °C (104 °F). In summer, rain is almost completely absent and the sunlight is at a maximum.

The average temperatures in the summer months of June, July, August, and September are very high. Sea breezes may mitigate the heat, but sometimes the sirocco winds reverse the trend. Occasional thunderstorms in the afternoon can develop quickly, especially after the periods of extremely hot weather. They usually do not produce precipitation (see dry thunderstorm), but may be accompanied by a brief shower. The highest temperature of 49.0 °C (120.2 °F) was recorded at Tunis-Carthage International Airport on July 24, 2023. In autumn, it begins to rain, often with short thunderstorms, which can sometimes cause flash floods or even flood some parts of the city. The month of November marks a break in the general heat with average temperatures ranging from 11 to 20 °C (52 to 68 °F).

Climate data for Tunis (Tunis–Carthage International Airport) 1991–2020, extremes 1943—present
Month	Jan	Feb	Mar	Apr	May	Jun	Jul	Aug	Sep	Oct	Nov	Dec	Year
Record high °C (°F)	25.6 (78.1)	28.7 (83.7)	36.5 (97.7)	33.1 (91.6)	41.4 (106.5)	47.0 (116.6)	49.0 (120.2)	49.0 (120.2)	44.4 (111.9)	40.0 (104.0)	34.5 (94.1)	29.6 (85.3)	49.0 (120.2)
Mean daily maximum °C (°F)	16.4 (61.5)	16.8 (62.2)	19.4 (66.9)	22.3 (72.1)	26.5 (79.7)	31.0 (87.8)	34.0 (93.2)	34.5 (94.1)	30.5 (86.9)	26.7 (80.1)	21.5 (70.7)	17.6 (63.7)	24.8 (76.6)
Daily mean °C (°F)	12.3 (54.1)	12.5 (54.5)	14.6 (58.3)	17.2 (63.0)	21.0 (69.8)	25.1 (77.2)	28.1 (82.6)	28.7 (83.7)	25.6 (78.1)	22.0 (71.6)	17.2 (63.0)	13.5 (56.3)	19.8 (67.6)
Mean daily minimum °C (°F)	8.2 (46.8)	8.1 (46.6)	9.8 (49.6)	12.1 (53.8)	15.4 (59.7)	19.3 (66.7)	22.1 (71.8)	22.9 (73.2)	20.7 (69.3)	17.3 (63.1)	12.8 (55.0)	9.4 (48.9)	14.8 (58.6)
Record low °C (°F)	−5.3 (22.5)	−2.6 (27.3)	0.0 (32.0)	1.7 (35.1)	5.2 (41.4)	10.6 (51.1)	13.0 (55.4)	11.7 (53.1)	10.9 (51.6)	5.6 (42.1)	−1.1 (30.0)	−0.1 (31.8)	−5.3 (22.5)
Average precipitation mm (inches)	58.9 (2.32)	54.9 (2.16)	45.8 (1.80)	37.9 (1.49)	22.4 (0.88)	12.8 (0.50)	4.4 (0.17)	14.5 (0.57)	58.2 (2.29)	54.7 (2.15)	53.1 (2.09)	68.1 (2.68)	485.6 (19.12)
Average precipitation days (≥ 1.0 mm)	8.4	8.0	6.3	5.7	3.7	1.5	0.5	1.7	5.0	5.8	6.8	8.3	61.5
Average relative humidity (%)	76	74	73	71	68	64	62	64	68	72	74	77	70
Mean monthly sunshine hours	164.1	176.8	220.0	235.8	291.4	317.3	354.6	327.3	250.7	220.7	175.2	157.8	2,891.7
Mean daily sunshine hours	5.3	5.7	6.4	7.5	9.1	10.3	11.5	10.6	8.6	7.0	5.8	5.1	7.7
Percentage possible sunshine	53	59	60	60	67	72	80	78	68	64	58	53	65
Average ultraviolet index	2	3	5	7	9	9	10	9	7	5	3	2	6
Source 1: Institut National de la Météorologie (humidity 1961-1990, sun 1981–2010) (Note: The Station ID for Le Kef is 23232111.)
Source 2: NOAA (humidity/daily sun 1961–1990), Meteo Climat (record highs and lows) and Weather Atlas (UV index)

== Politics ==
=== Capital ===
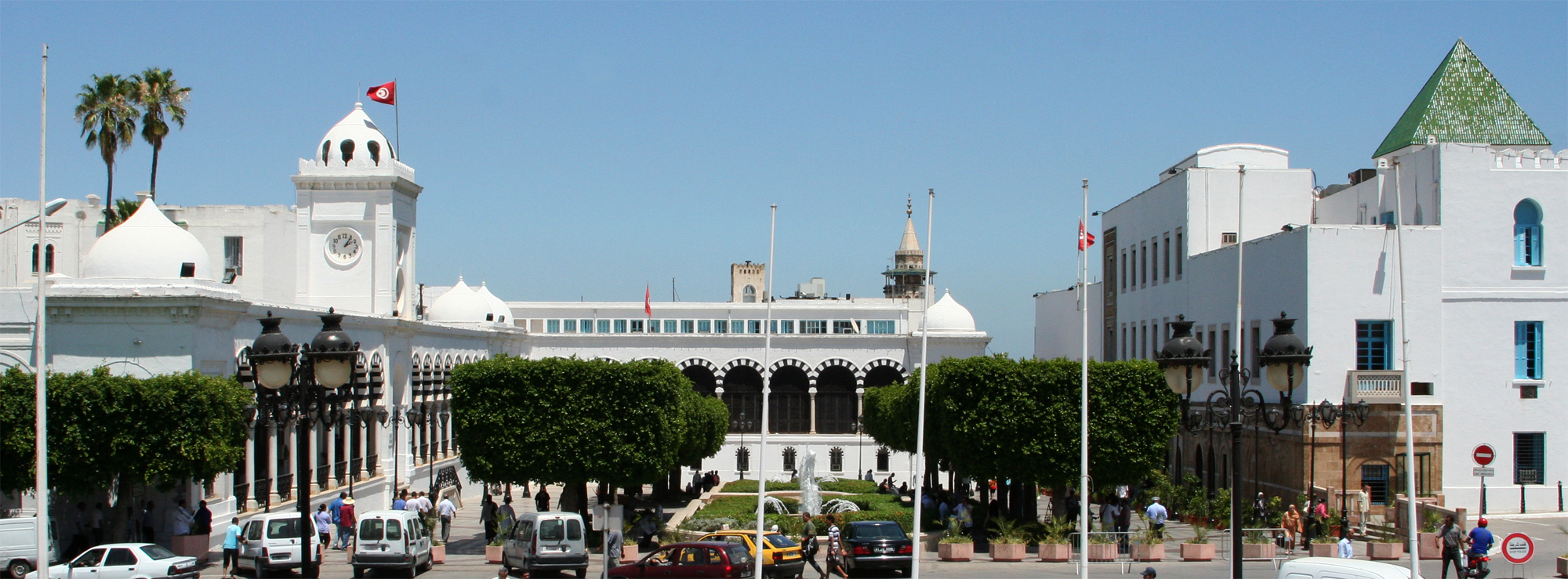
Kasbah Square comprising the finance ministry and the prime ministry of Tunisia

Tunis has been the capital of Tunisia since 1159. Under Articles 43 and 24 of the Constitution of 1959, Tunis and its suburbs host the national institutions: the Presidential Palace, which is known as Carthage Palace, residence of the President of Tunisia, the Chamber of Deputies and the Chamber of Advisors and parliament, the Constitutional Council and the main judicial institutions and public bodies. The revised Tunisian Constitution of 2014 similarly provides that the National Assembly is to sit in Tunis (article 51) and that the Presidency is based there (article 73).

=== Municipality ===
==== Institutions ====
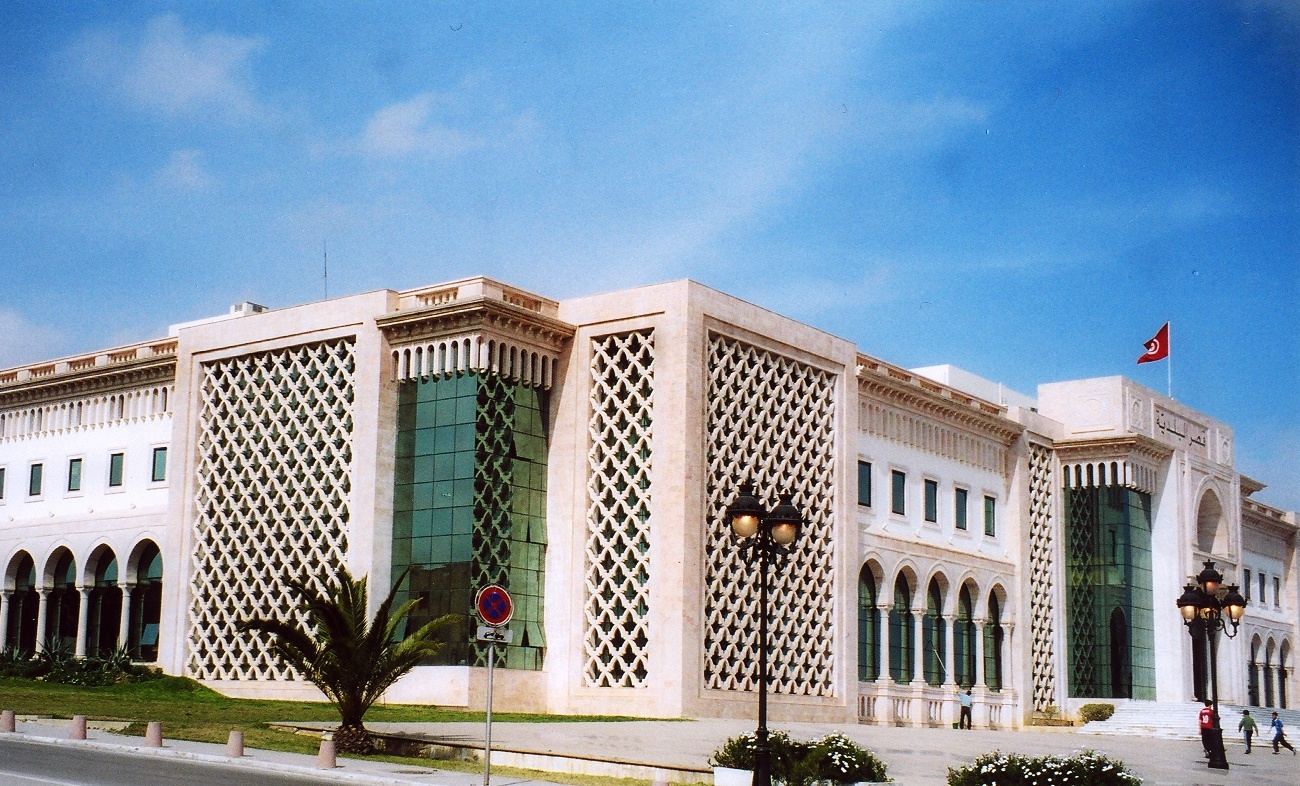
City Hall

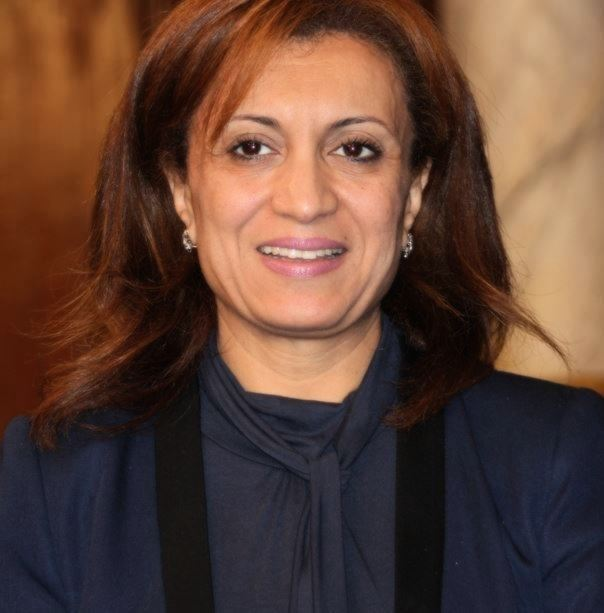
Souad Abderrahim, mayor of Tunis since 2018.

Following the municipal elections of 6 May 2018, Ennahdha obtained 21 seats out of 60. Nidaa Tounes came second with 17 seats. On 3 July 2018, the head of the Ennahdha list Souad Abderrahim was elected by the council as the new mayor of the capital.

Before 2011, unlike other mayors in Tunisia, the mayor of Tunis was appointed by decree of the President of the Republic from among the members of the City Council.

==== Budget ====
The 2008 budget adopted by the City Council is structured as follows: 61.61 million dinars for operations and 32,516 million dinars for investment. It reflects the improved financial situation of the municipality, the year 2007 was a year registering a surplus in resources that allowed the settlement of debts of the municipality and the strengthening of its credibility with respect its suppliers and public and private partners.

Revenues are generated by the proceeds of taxes on buildings and vacant lots, fees for the rental of municipal property, income from the operation of the public, advertising, and that the fact that the municipality has capital shares in some companies. On the expenditure side, provision is made for the consolidation of hygiene and cleanliness, the state of the environment and urban design, infrastructure maintenance, rehabilitation and renovation of facilities, and strengthening the logistics and means of work and transport.

==== Administrative divisions ====
The city of Tunis, whose size has increased significantly during the second half of the 20th century, now extends beyond the Tunis Governorate into parts of the governorates of Ben Arous, Ariana and Manouba.

The municipality of Tunis is divided into 15 municipal districts: These include El Bab Bhar, Bab Souika, Cité El Khadra, Jelloud Jebel El Kabaria, El Menzah, El Ouardia, Ettahrir, Ezzouhour, Hraïria, Medina, El Omrane, El Omrane Higher Séjoumi and Sidi El-Bashir.

Map of the arrondissements of Tunis – 1, Médina; 2, Sidi El Béchir; 3, Sijoumi; 4, Bab Souika; 5, El Omrane; 6, Bab Bhar; 7, El Menzah; 8, El Omrane Supérieur; 9, Ettahrir; 10, Bardo; 11, Ezzouhour; 12, El Ourdia; 13, Jebel Jelloud; 14, Kabaria; 15, Cité El Khadra; 16, El Bouhaira; 17, La Marsa; 18, Carthage; 19, La Goulette; 20, Hrairia; 21, Sidi Hassine.

== Demography ==
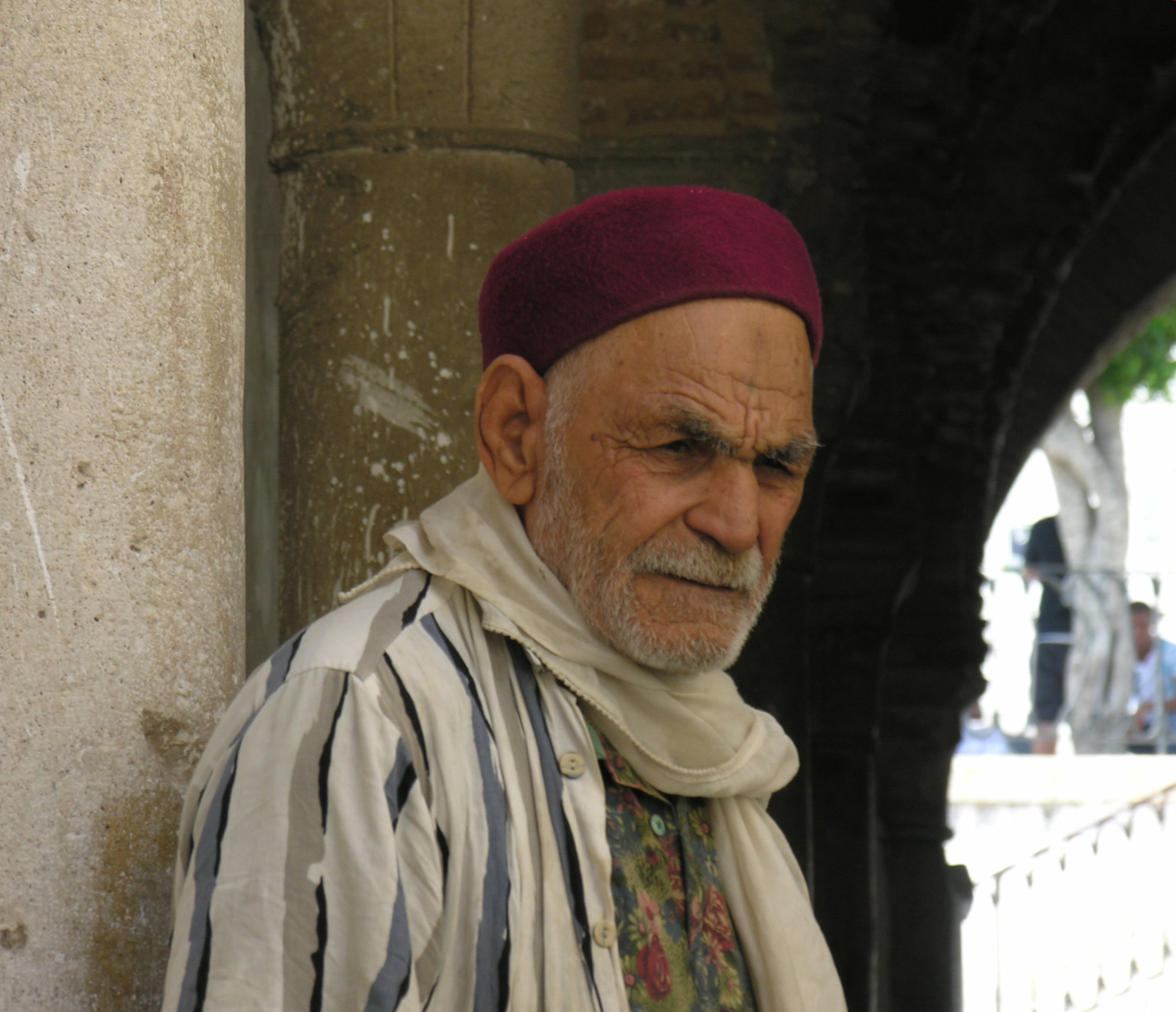
Elderly man in Tunis wearing a Chechia.

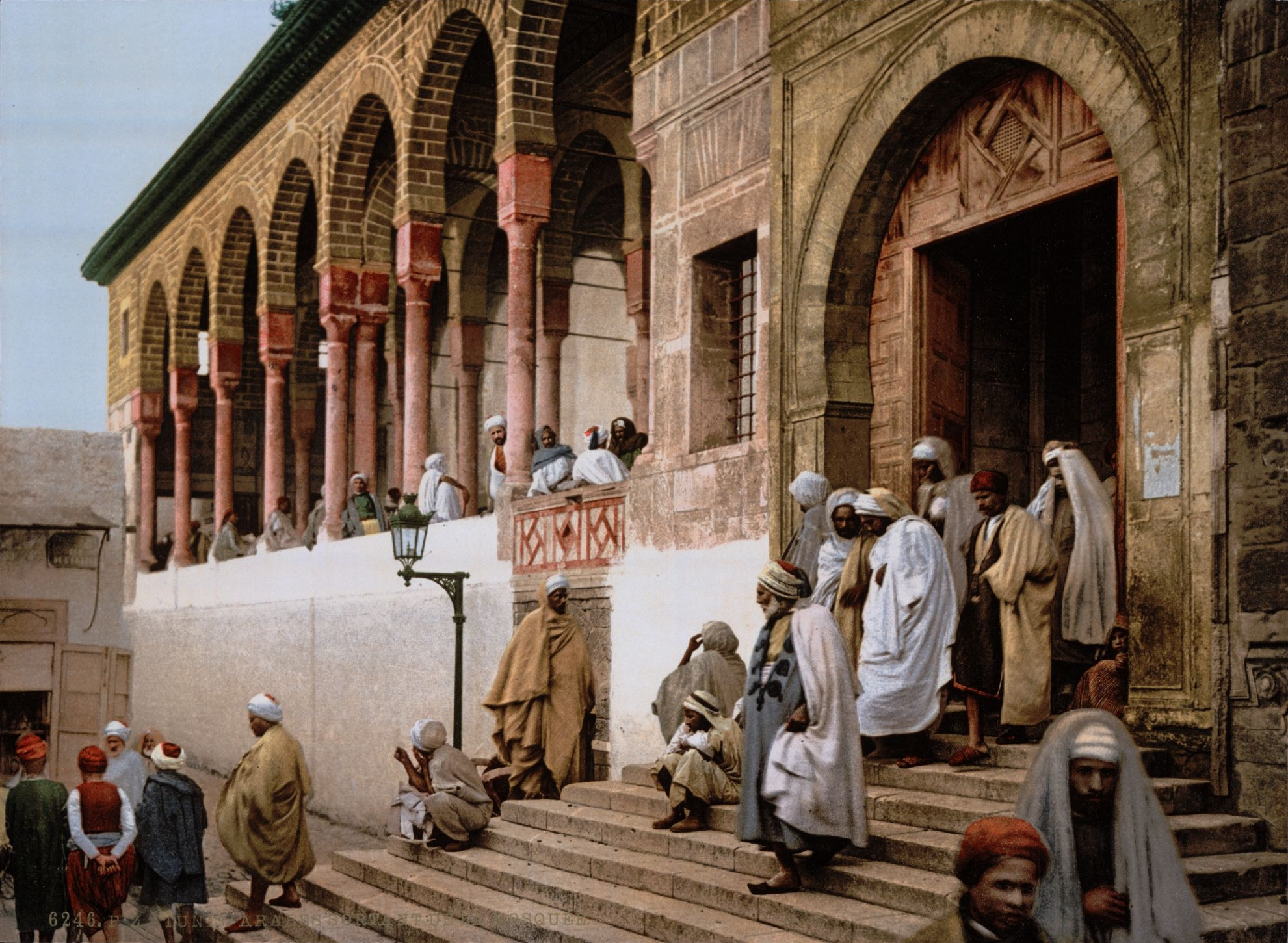
Muslims in Tunis attend the mosque in 1899.

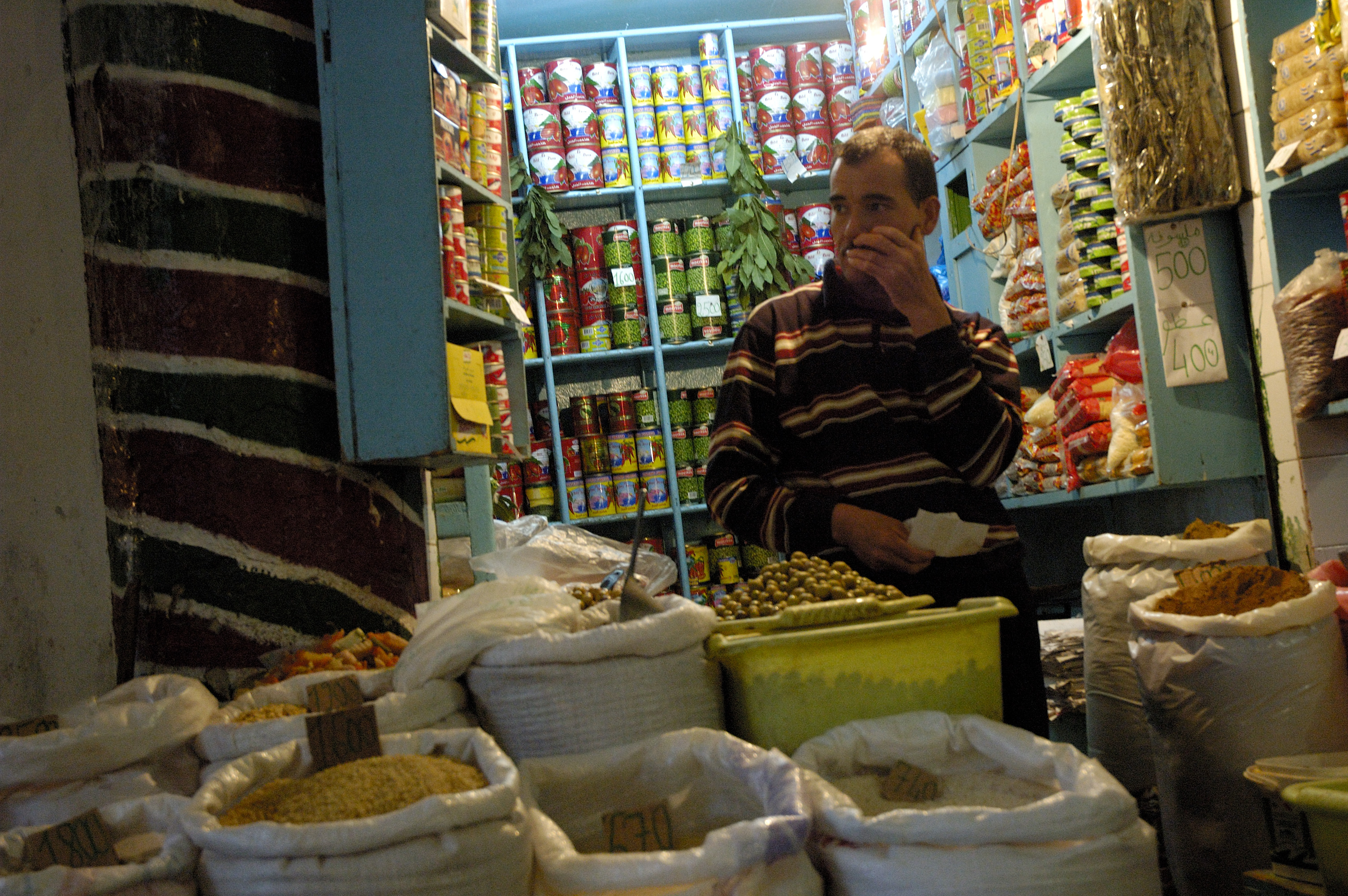
A souk shopkeeper

Year	Municipality	Metropolitan area
1891	114,121	
1901	146,276	
1911	162,479	
1921	171,676	192,994
1926	185,996	210,240
1931	202,405	235,230
1936	219,578	258,113
1946	364,593	449,820
1956	410,000	561,117
1966	468,997	679,603
1975	550,404	873,515
Sources: Sebag (1998)

In the years following independence, the population of the metropolitan area continued to grow: by 21.1% from 1956 to 1966 and by 28.5% from 1966 to 1975 (55.6% between 1956 and 1975). This steady growth was accompanied by changes that affected the nature of the settlement of the capital. Decolonization led to the exodus of some European minorities whose numbers dwindled every year. The gaps created by their departure were filled by Tunisians who emigrated to Tunis from other parts of the country.

The population of the city of Tunis exceeds 2,000,000 inhabitants. After independence, the Tunisian government implemented a plan to cope with the population growth of the city and country, a system of family planning, to attempt to lower the rate of population growth. However, between 1994 and 2004, the population of the governorate of Tunis grew more than 1.03% per annum. It represents, in the 2004 census, 9.9% of the total population of Tunisia. As in the rest of Tunisia, literacy in the region of Tunis evolved rapidly during the second half of the 20th century and has reached a level slightly higher than the national average. The education level is only exceeded by the neighboring governorate of Ariana which has many institutions of education.

== Economy ==
=== Overview ===
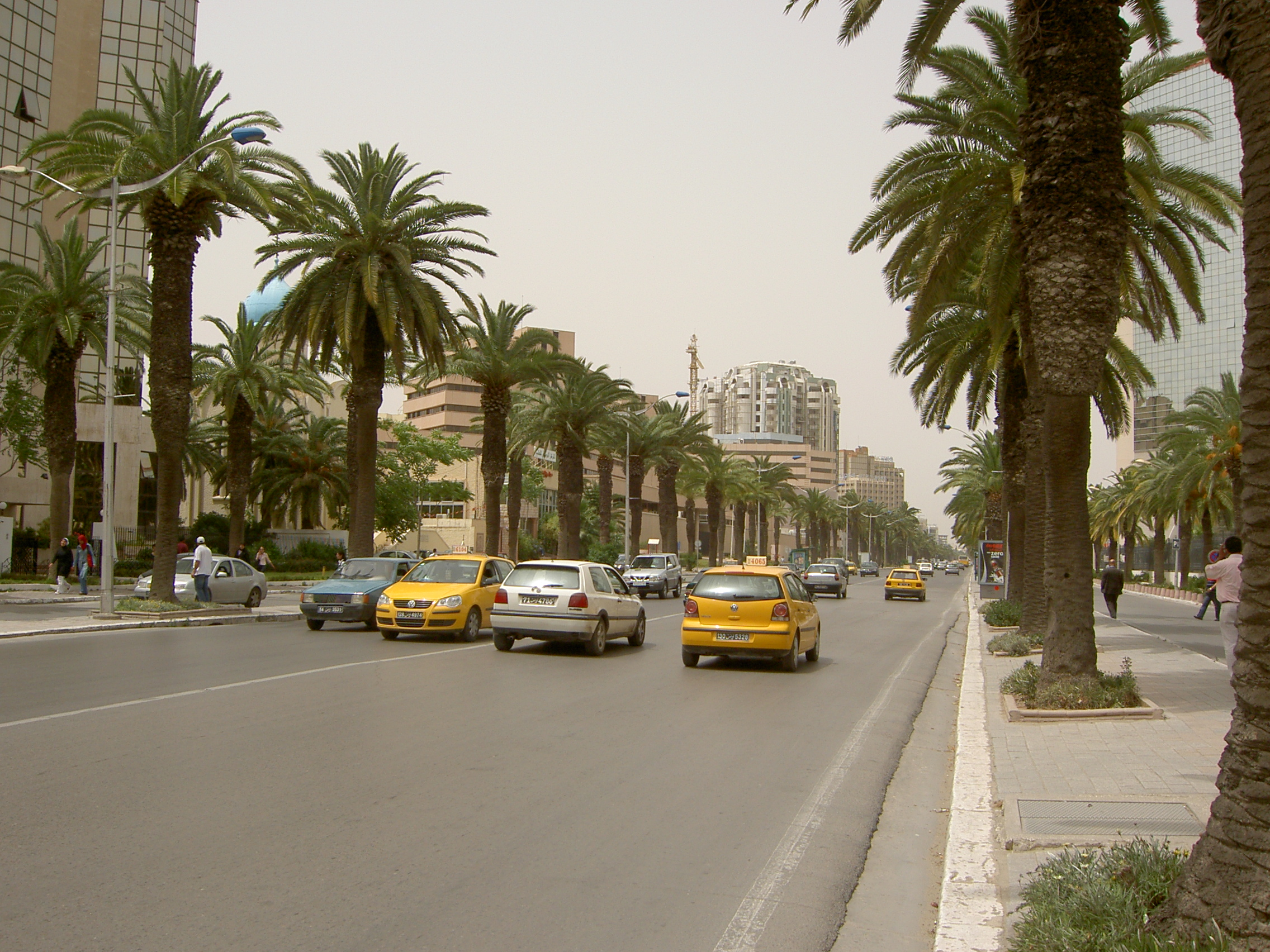
Avenue Mohamed V in the financial district

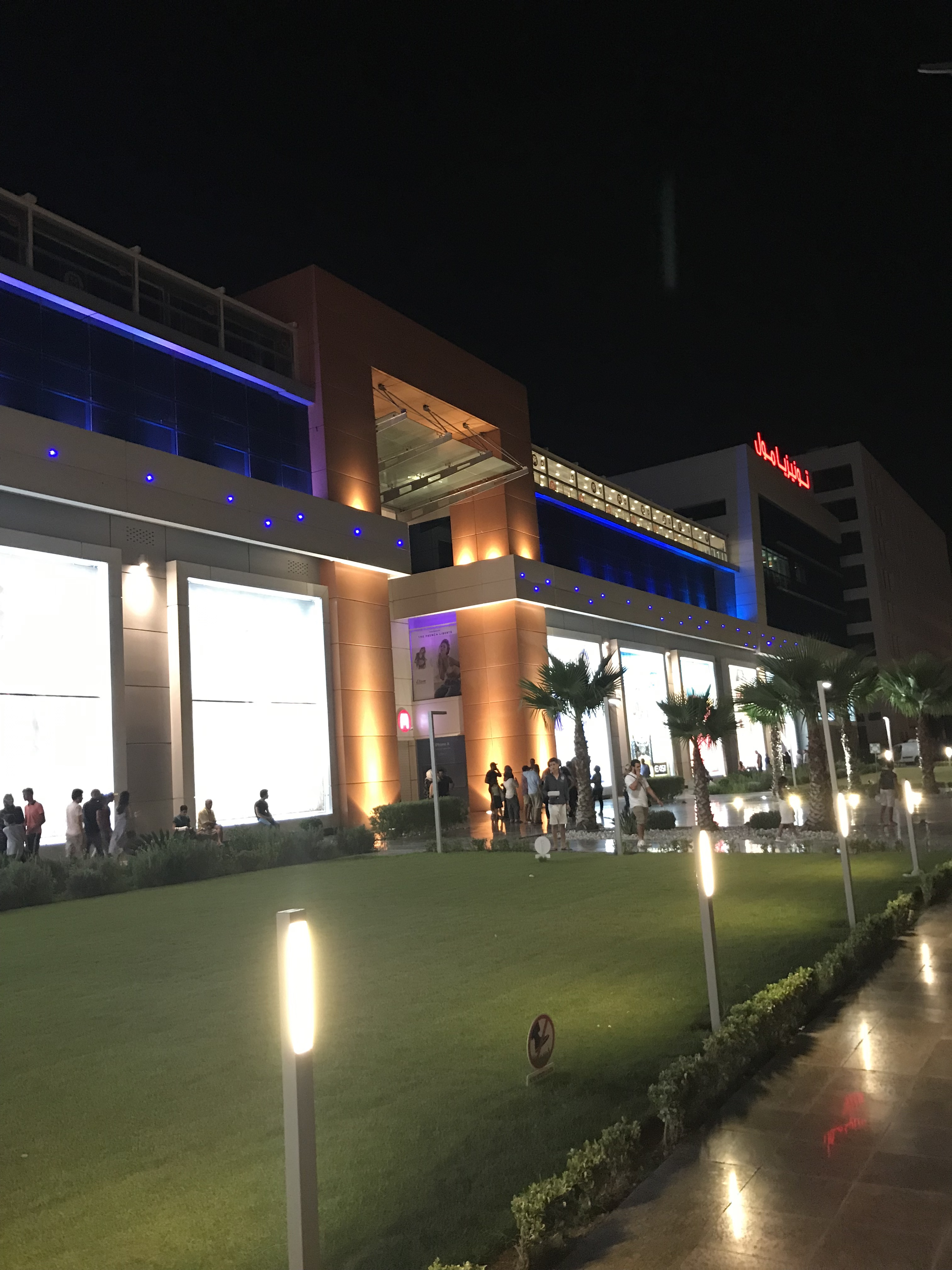
Tunisia Mall

Products include textiles, carpets, and olive oil. Tourism also provides a significant portion of the city's income.

Because of the concentration of political authority (headquarters of the central government, presidency, parliament, ministries, and central government) and culture (festivals and mainstream media), Tunis is the only nationally ranking metropolis. Tunis is the heartland of the Tunisian economy and is the industrial and economic hub of the country, home to a third of Tunisian companies—including almost all the head offices of companies with more than fifty employees, with the exception of the Compagnie des phosphates de Gafsa, headquartered in Gafsa—and produces a third of the national gross domestic product.

Tunis attracts foreign investors (33% of companies, 26% of investments and 27% of employment), excluding several areas due to economic imbalances. According to the Mercer 2017 Cost of Living Rankings, Tunis has the lowest cost of living for expatriates in the world. The urban unemployment rate of university graduates is increasing and the illiteracy rate remains high among the elderly (27% of women and 12% of men). The number of people living below the poverty line, falling at the national level, remains higher in urban areas. In addition, unemployment is high in young people aged 18 to 24, with one in three unemployed as compared to one in six at the national level. In Greater Tunis, the proportion of young unemployed is at 35%.

Gulf finance house or GFH has invested $10 billion in order for the construction of Tunis financial harbor, which will transform Tunisia as the gateway to Africa from Europe. The project hopes to boost the economy of Tunisia as well as increase the number of tourists visiting Tunisia annually. The project is going through planning.

=== Sectors ===
The economic structure of Tunis, as well as that of the country, is overwhelmingly tertiary industry. The city is the largest financial center in the country hosting the headquarters of 65% of financial companies – while the industrial sectors are gradually declining in importance. However the secondary industry is still very represented and Tunis hosts 85% of industrial establishments in the four governorates, with a trend towards the spread of specialized industrial zones in the suburbs.

Primary industry such as agriculture, however, is active in specialized agricultural areas in the suburbs, particularly in the wine and olive oil industries. The generally flat terrain and the two main rivers in Tunisia, the Medjerda to the north and the Milian to the south, the soils are fertile. Tunis has several large plains, the most productive are in Ariana and La Soukra (north), the plain of Manouba (west) and the plain of Mornag (south). In addition, groundwater is easily accessible through the drilling of deep wells, providing water for the different agriculture crops. The soils are heavy and contain limestone in the north but are lighter and sandy containing clay in the south. There is much diversification in the municipality of Tunis, with Durum grown in Manouba, Olives and olive oil in Ariana and Mornag, wine (Mornag), and fruit, vegetable and legumes are grown in all regions.

== Architecture and landscape ==
=== Urban landscape ===
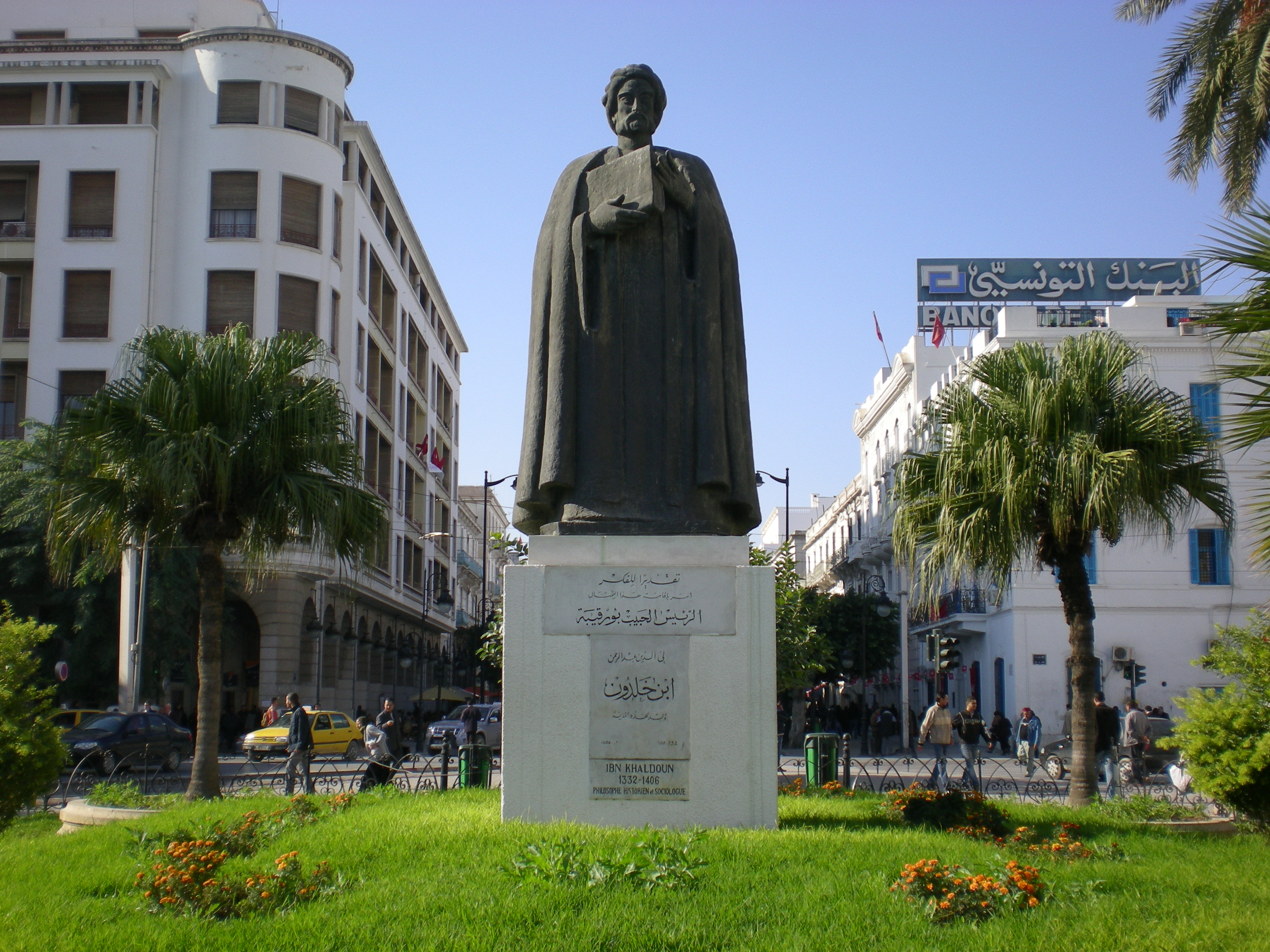
Statue of Ibn Khaldoun in Independence Square

The Medina, built on a gentle hill slope on the way down to the Lake of Tunis, is the historical heart of the city and home to many monuments, including palaces, such as the Dar Ben Abdallah and Dar Hussein, the mausoleum of Tourbet el Bey and many mosques such as the Al-Zaytuna Mosque. Some of the fortifications around it have now largely disappeared, and it is flanked by the two suburbs of Bab Souika to the north and Bab El Jazira to the south. Located near the Bab Souika, the neighborhood of Halfaouine gained international attention through the film 'Halfaouine Child of the Terraces'.

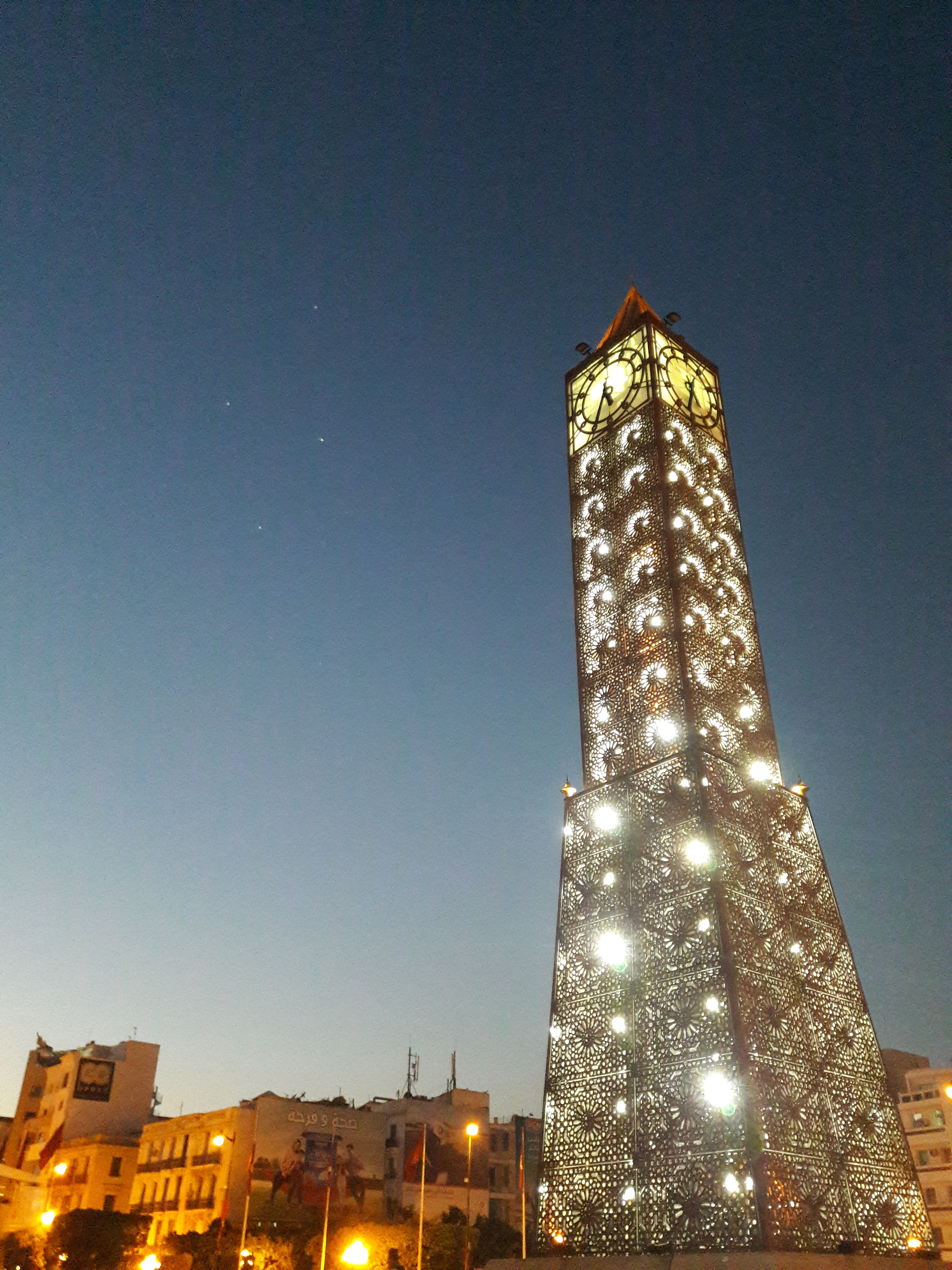
Avenue Habib-Bourguiba

But east of the original nucleus, first with the construction of the French Consulate, the modern city was built gradually with the introduction of the French protectorate at the end of the 19th century, on open land between the city and the lake. The axis to the structure of this part of the city is the Avenue Habib Bourguiba, designed by the French to be a Tunisian form of Champs-Élysées in Paris with its cafes, major hotels, shops, and cultural venues. On both sides of the tree lined avenue, north and south, the city was extended in various districts, with the northern end welcoming residential and business districts while the south receives industrial districts and poorer peoples.

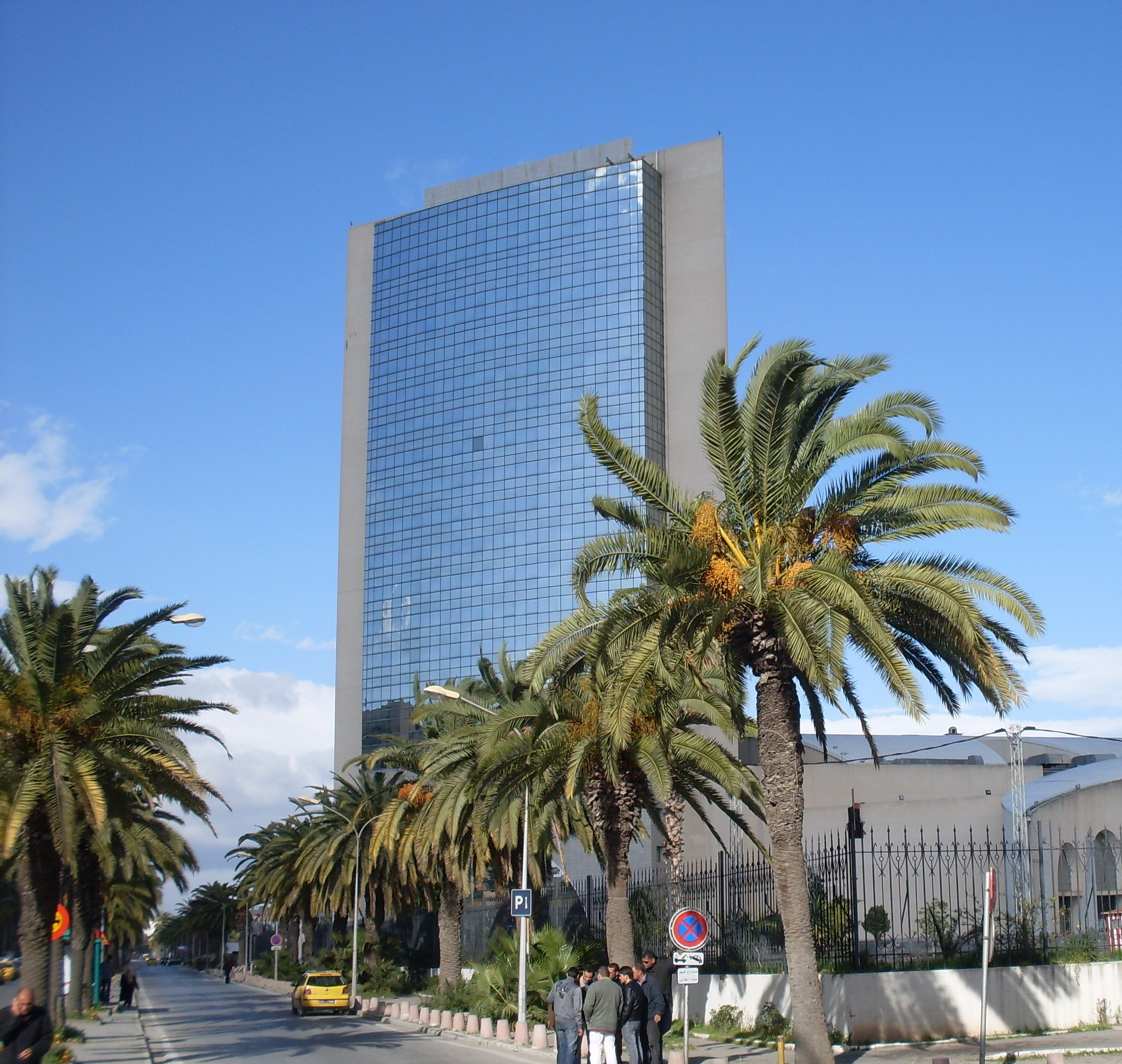
View of the building of "Tour de la nation" in avenue Mohamed-V

South-east of the Avenue Bourguiba the district of La Petite Sicile (Little Sicily) is adjacent to the old port area and takes its name from its original population of workers from Italy. It is now the subject of a redevelopment project including the construction of twin towers. North of the Avenue Bourguiba is the district of La Fayette, which is still home to the Great Synagogue of Tunis and the Habib Thameur Gardens, built on the site of an ancient Jewish cemetery that lay outside the walls. Also to the north is the long Avenue Mohamed V, which leads to the Boulevard of 7 November through the neighborhood of the big banks where there are hotels and Abu Nawas Lake and finally to the Belvedere area around the place Pasteur. This is where the Belvedere Park lies, the largest in the city, and home to a zoo and the Pasteur Institute founded by Adrien Loir in 1893. Continuing to the north are the most exclusive neighborhoods of Mutuelleville which house the French Lycée Pierre-Mendès-France, the Sheraton Hotel, and some embassies.

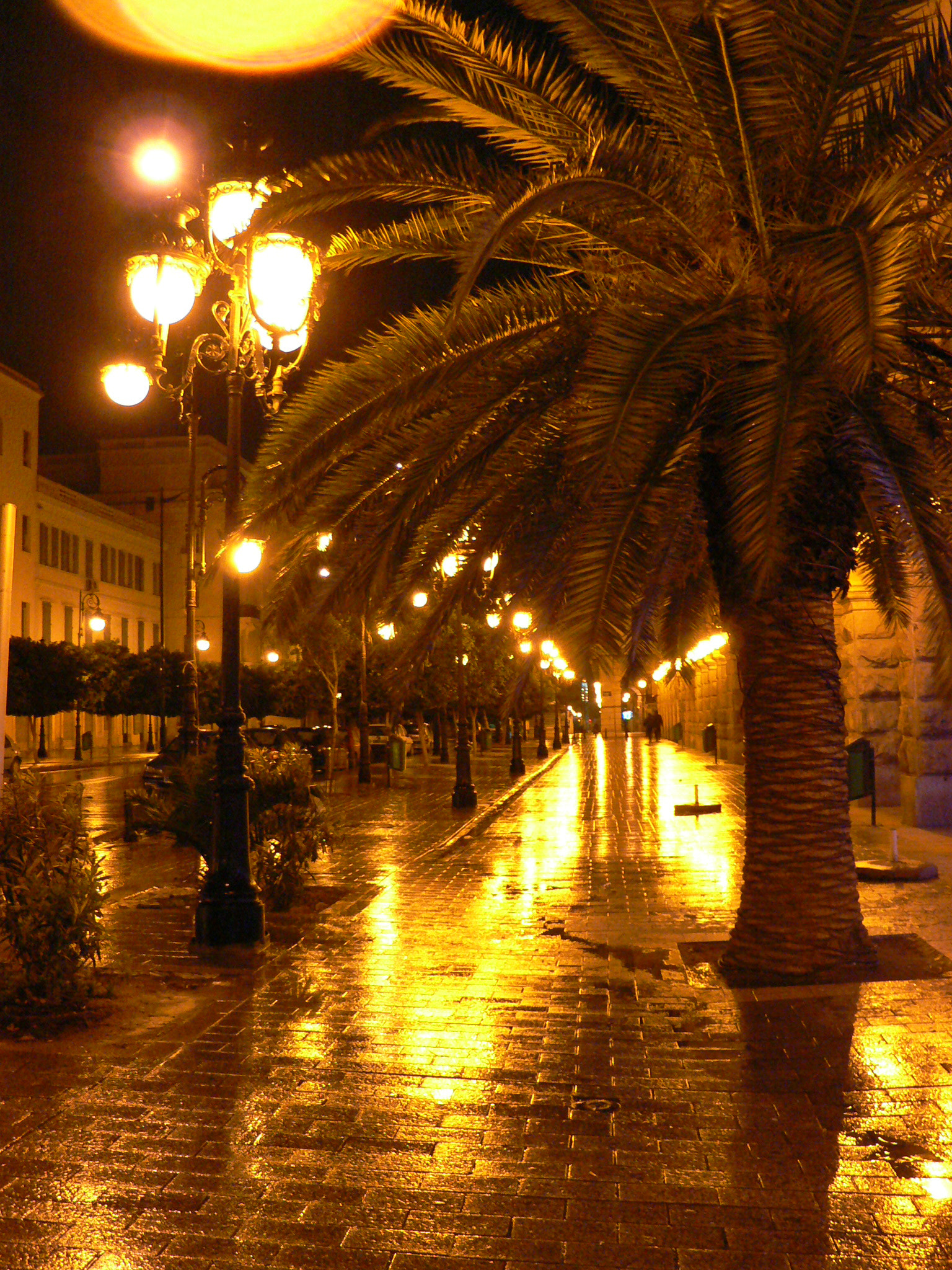
Tunis at night

Still further north of the Belvedere Park, behind the Boulevard of 7 November are the neighborhoods of El Menzah and El Manar now reaching the peaks of the hills overlooking the north of the town. They support a range of residential and commercial buildings. To the west of the park lies the district of El Omrane which holds the main Muslim cemetery in the capital and the warehouses of public transport. Heading east is the Tunis-Carthage International Airport and the neighborhoods of Borgel, giving his name to the existing Jewish and Christian cemeteries in the capital, and the neighborhood of Montplaisir. Beyond that, several kilometers north-east, on the road to La Marsa, the Berges du Lac was built on land reclaimed from the north shore of the lake near the airport, which has held offices of Tunisian and foreign companies, many embassies as well as shops.

Southwest of the Medina, on the crest of the hills across the Isthmus of Tunis, is the Montfleury district then on down to the foothills of Séjoumi, the poor neighbourhood of Mellassine. Northwest of the latter, north of the National Route 3 leading to the west, is the city of Ezzouhour (formerly El Kharrouba), which spans more than three metres (9.8 feet) and is divided into five sections. It is still surrounded by farmland and vegetables are grown which supply many of the souks in the region.

The south of Tunis is made up of disadvantaged neighbourhoods, especially due to the strong industry in this part of the metropolis. These include Jebel Jelloud, located in the southeast of Tunis, which concentrates on the heavy industry of cement production, the treatment plant of phosphate s, etc. The main cemetery in Tunis, the Djellaz Cemetery, dominates this part of town, perched on the slopes of a rocky outcrop.

=== Médina ===
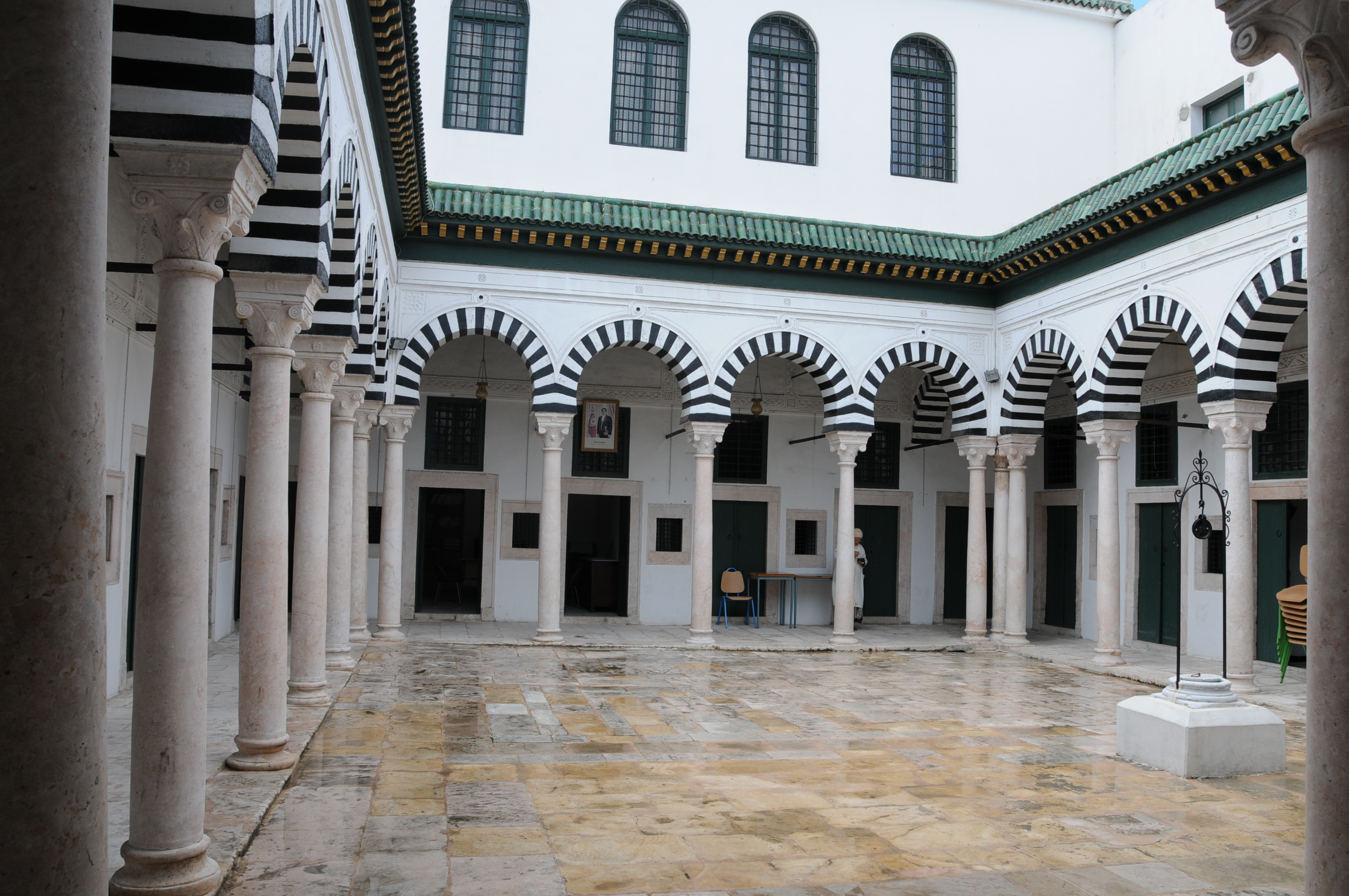
Court of Dar Soulaimania, once the boarding lodge of University of Ez-Zitouna.

The medina of Tunis has been a UNESCO World Heritage Site since 1979. The Medina contains some 700 monuments, including palaces, mosques, mausoleums, madrasas, and fountains dating from the Almohad and the Hafsid periods. These ancient buildings include:

- The Aghlabid Al-Zaytouna Mosque ("Mosque of the Olive") built in 723 by Ubayd Allah ibn al-Habhab to celebrate the new capital.
- The Dar El Bey, or Bey's Palace, comprises architecture and decoration from many different styles and periods and is believed to stand on the remains of a Roman theatre as well as the 10th-century palace of Ziadib-Allah II al Aghlab.

With an area of 270 hectares (over 29 hectares for the Kasbah) and more than 100,000 people, the Medina comprises one-tenth of the population of Tunis. The planning of the Medina of Tunis has the distinction of not grid lines or formal geometric compositions. However, studies were undertaken in the 1930s with the arrival of the first anthropologists who found that the space of the Medina is not random: the houses are based on a socio-cultural code according to the types of complex human relations.

Domestic architecture (palaces and townhouses), official and civilian (libraries and administrations), religious (mosques and zaouïas), and services (commercial and fondouks) are located in the Medina. The notion of public space is ambiguous in the case of Medina where the streets are seen as an extension of the houses and subject to social tags. The concept of ownership is low however and souks often spill out onto public roads. Today, each district has its culture, and rivalries can be strong.

The northern end supports the football club of Esperance Sportive de Tunis while at the other end is the rival Club Africain. The Medina also has a social sectorization: with the neighborhood of Tourbet el Bey and the Kasbah district being aristocratic, with a population of judges and politicians, while the streets of Pacha often being military and bourgeois.

Founded in 698 is the Al-Zaytuna Mosque and the surrounding area which developed throughout the Middle Ages, dividing Tunis into a main town in two suburbs, in the north (Bab Souika) and the south (Bab El Jazira). The area became the capital of a powerful kingdom during the Hafsid era and was considered a religious and intellectual home and economic center for the Middle East, Africa, and Europe. A great fusion of influences can be seen blending Andalusian styles with eastern influences, and Roman or Byzantine columns, and typical Arab architecture, characterized by the archways.

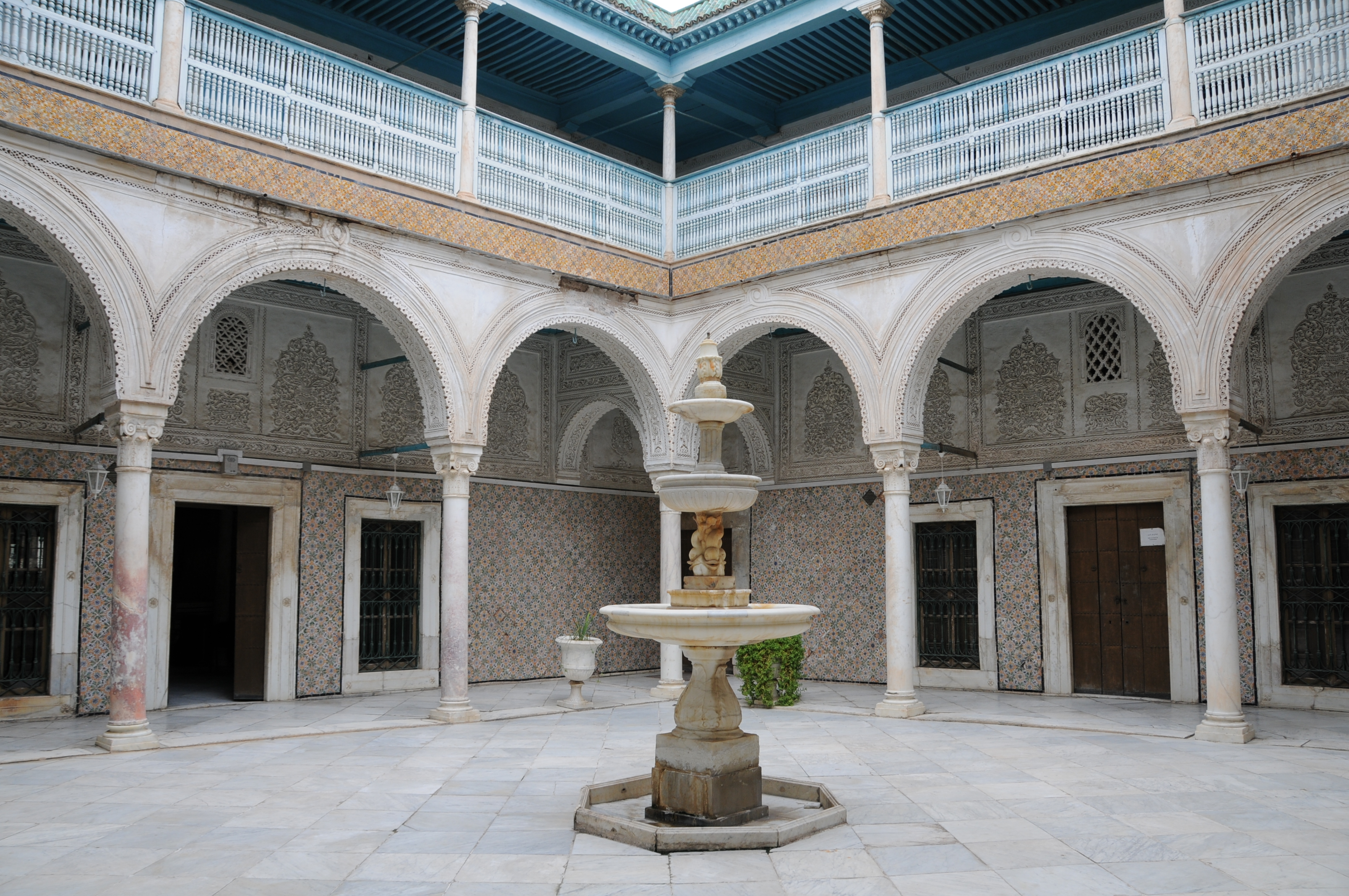
Court of Dar Ben Abdallah

The architectural heritage is also omnipresent in the homes of individuals and small palace officials as well as in the palace of the sovereign of Kasbah. Although some palaces and houses date back to the Middle Ages, a greater number of prestigious houses were built in the 17th, 18th, and 19th centuries such as Dar Othman (early 17th century), Dar Ben Abdallah (18th century), Dar Hussein, Dar Cherif and other houses. The main palace beys are those of La Marsa, Bardo, and Ksar Said. If we add the mosques and oratories (about 200), the madrasahs (El Bachia, Slimania, El Achouria, Bir El Ahjar, Ennakhla, etc..), The zaouias (Mahrez Sidi Sidi Ali Azouz, Sidi Abdel Kader, etc.) and Tourbet El Fellari, Tourbet Aziza Othman and Tourbet El Bey the number of monuments in Tunis approaches 600. Unlike Algiers, Palermo and Naples, its historical heart has never suffered from major natural disasters or urban radical interventions. The main conflicts and potentially destructive human behavior has been experienced in the city occurred relatively recently following the country's independence which is why it made into a World Heritage Site by UNESCO in 1979. At the beginning of the 21st century, the Medina is one of the best-preserved urban locations in the Arab world.

Furthermore, along the boulevards, the contribution of the architectural period 1850–1950 can be felt in the buildings, such as the government buildings of the nine ministries and the headquarters of the municipality of Tunis.

=== Other landmarks ===
- The Bardo Museum was originally a 13th-century Hafsid palace, located in the (then) suburbs of Tunis. It contains a major collection of Roman empires and other antiquities of interest from Ancient Greece, Tunisia, and the Arab period.
- The ruins of Carthage are nearby, along the coast to the northeast, with many ancient ruins.

==== Souks ====
The souks are a network of covered streets lined with shops and traders and artisans ordered by specialty. Clothing merchants, perfumers, fruit sellers, booksellers, and wool merchants have goods at the souks, while fishmongers, blacksmiths, and potters tend to be relegated to the periphery of the markets.

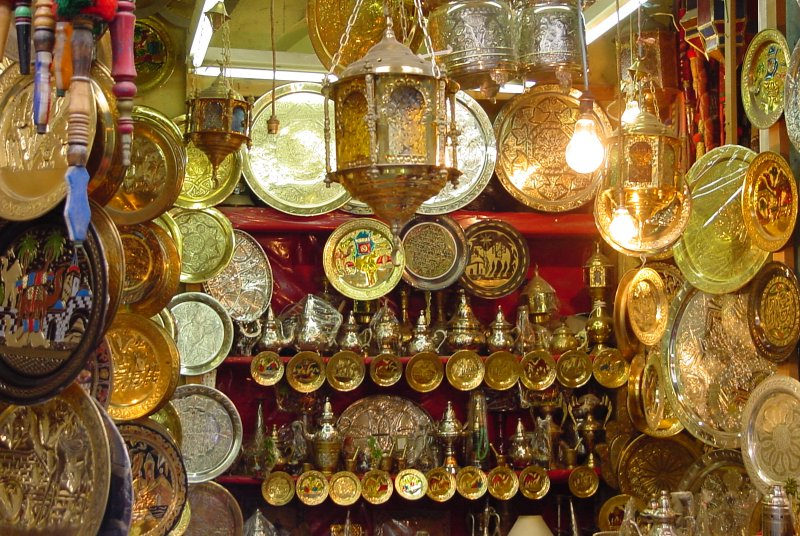
Souk En Nhas with items of copper

North of the Al-Zaytuna Mosque is the Souk El Attarine, built in the early 18th century. It is known for its essences and perfumes. From this souk, there is a street leading to the Souk Ech-Chaouachine (chachia). The main company that operates it is one of the oldest in the country and they are generally descendants of Andalusian immigrants expelled from Spain. Attached to El Attarine are two other souks: the first, which runs along the western coast of the Al-Zaytuna Mosque, is the Souk El Kmach which is noted for its fabrics, and the second, the Souk El Berka, which was built in the 17th century and houses embroiderers and jewelers. Given the valuable items it sells, it is the only souk whose doors are closed and guarded during the night. In the middle, there is a square where the former slave market stood until the middle of the 19th century.

Souk El Berka leads to Souk El Leffa, a souk that sells many carpets, blankets, and other weavings, and extends with the Souk Es Sarragine, built in the early 18th century and specializing in leather. At the periphery are the souks Et Trouk, El Blat, El Blaghgia, El Kébabgia, En Nhas (copper), Es Sabbaghine (dyeing) and El Grana that sell clothing and blankets and was occupied by Jewish merchants.

==== Walls and gates ====
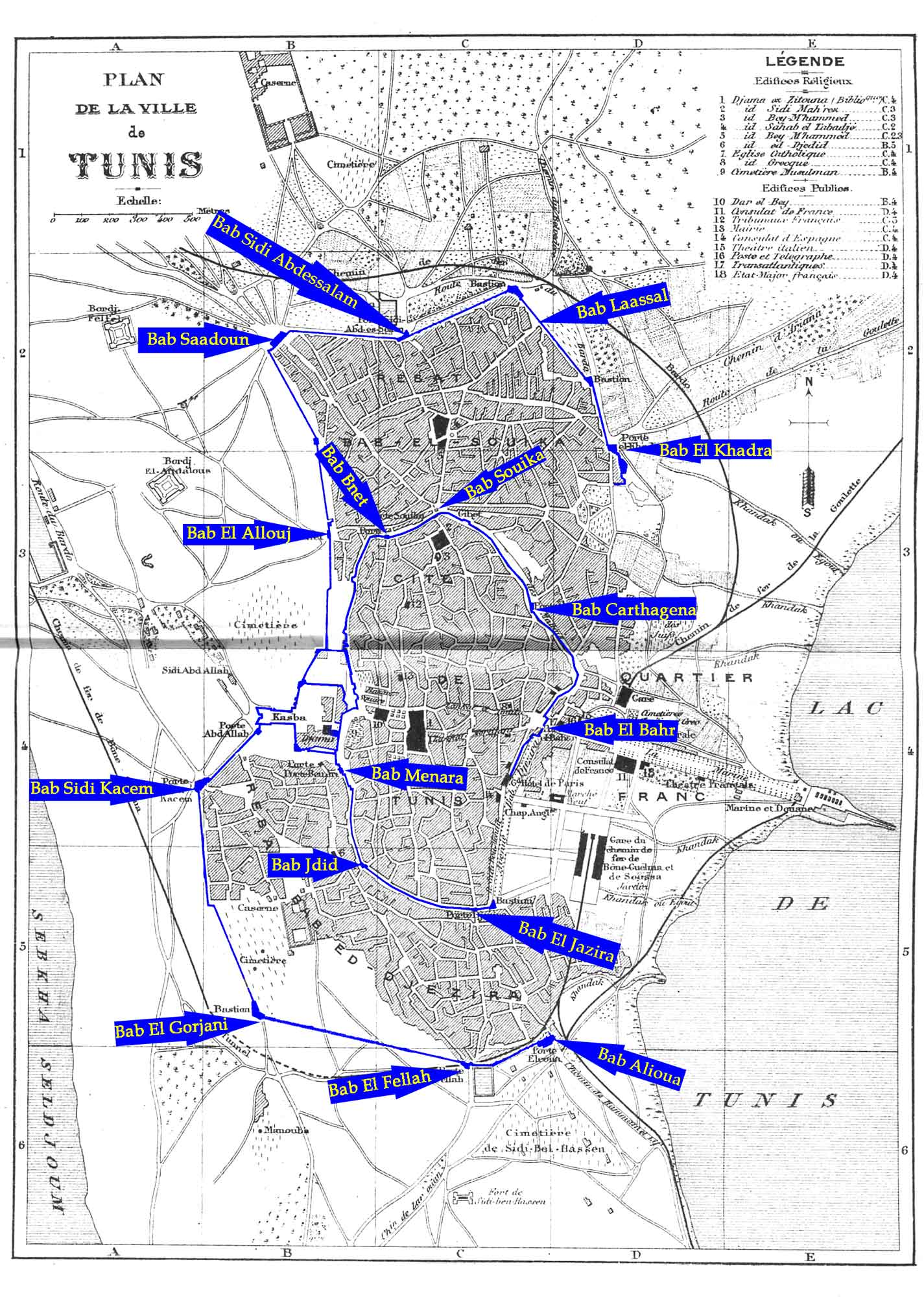
Walls and gates of the city in 1888

From the early days of its founding, Tunis has been considered an important military base. The Arab geographer El Yacoubi has written that in the 9th century Tunis was surrounded by a wall of brick and clay except for the side of the sea where it was stone. Bab El-Jazeera, perhaps the oldest gate of the south wall, opened onto the southern road. Bab Cartagena gave access to Carthage, important for bringing in construction materials needed for the city. Bab Souika (initially known as Bab El Saqqayin) had a strategic role to keep the roads to Bizerte, Béja and Le Kef. Bab Menara (initially known as Bab El Artha) opened onto the medina and onto the suburb of El Haoua. As for El Bab Bhar, it allowed access to some funduqs where Christian merchants lived in Tunis.

With the development of the capital under the reign of the Hafsids, two emerging suburbs grew outside the walls; Bab El Jazira in the south and Bab Souika to the north. In the early 14th century, Hafsid Darba Abû al-Muhammad al-Mustansir Lihyânî ordered the construction of a second chamber including the Medina and two suburbs outside. Six new gates were built including Bab El Khadra, Bab Saadoun, Bab El Allouj (initially called Bab Er-Rehiba), Khalid or Bab Bab Sidi Abdallah Cherif, Bab El Fellah and Bab Alioua. In the Ottoman period, four new gates were established: Bab Laassal, Bab Sidi Abdesselam, Bab El Bab Gorjani, and Sidi Kacem. The city retains some of these gates including Bab El Khadra, Bab El Bhar, and Bab Jedid but some of the earlier ones have long disappeared.

=== Places of worship ===
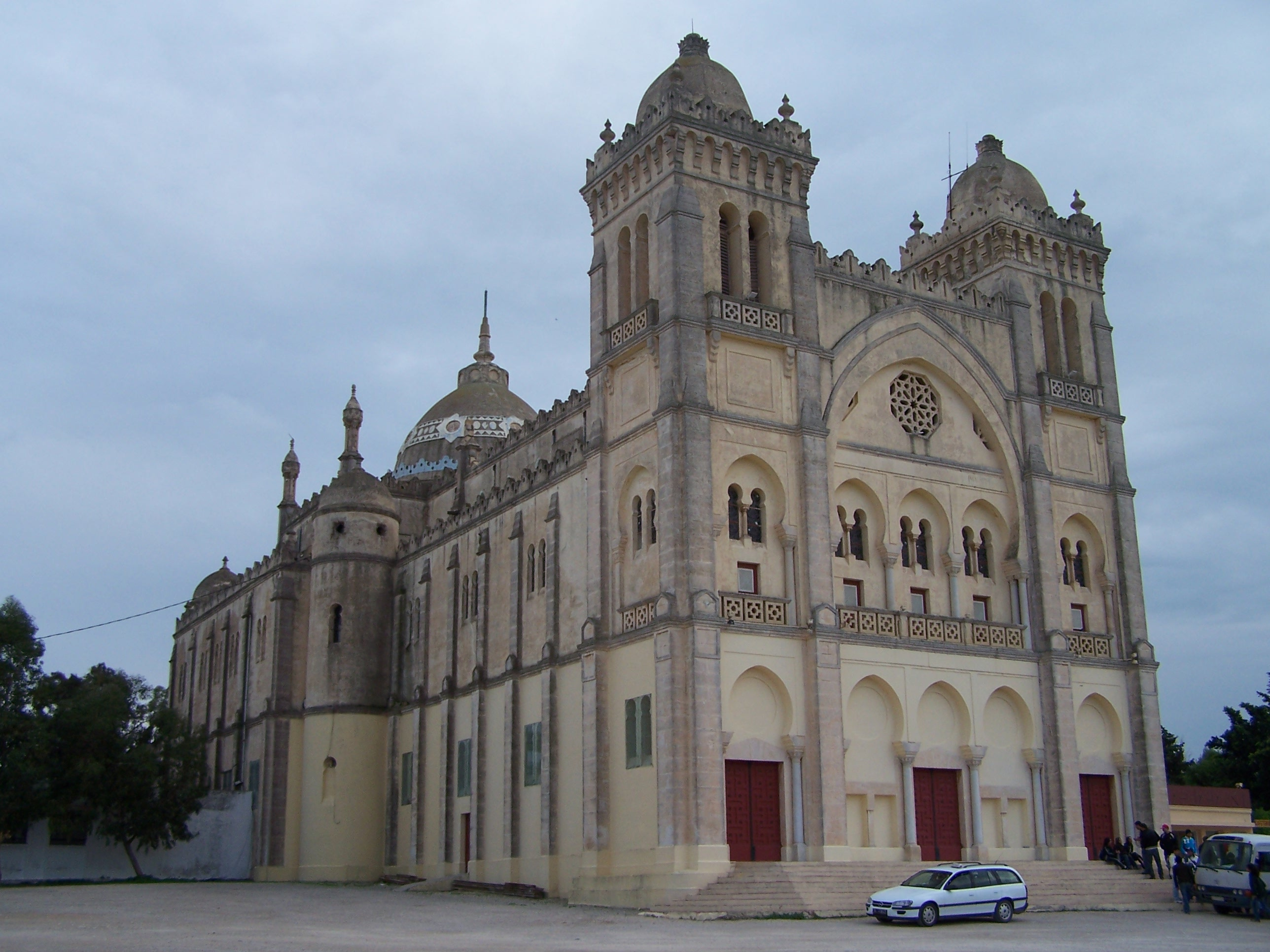
St. Louis Cathedral on the Byrsa hill at Carthage

Among the places of worship, they are predominantly Muslim mosques. There are also Christian churches and temples : Roman Catholic Archdiocese of Tunis (Catholic Church), Protestant churches, Evangelical Churches.

As in the rest of Tunisia, a very large majority of the population of Tunis (around 99%) is Sunni Muslim. The capital is home to a large number of mosques in various architectural styles, signs of construction of their respective eras.

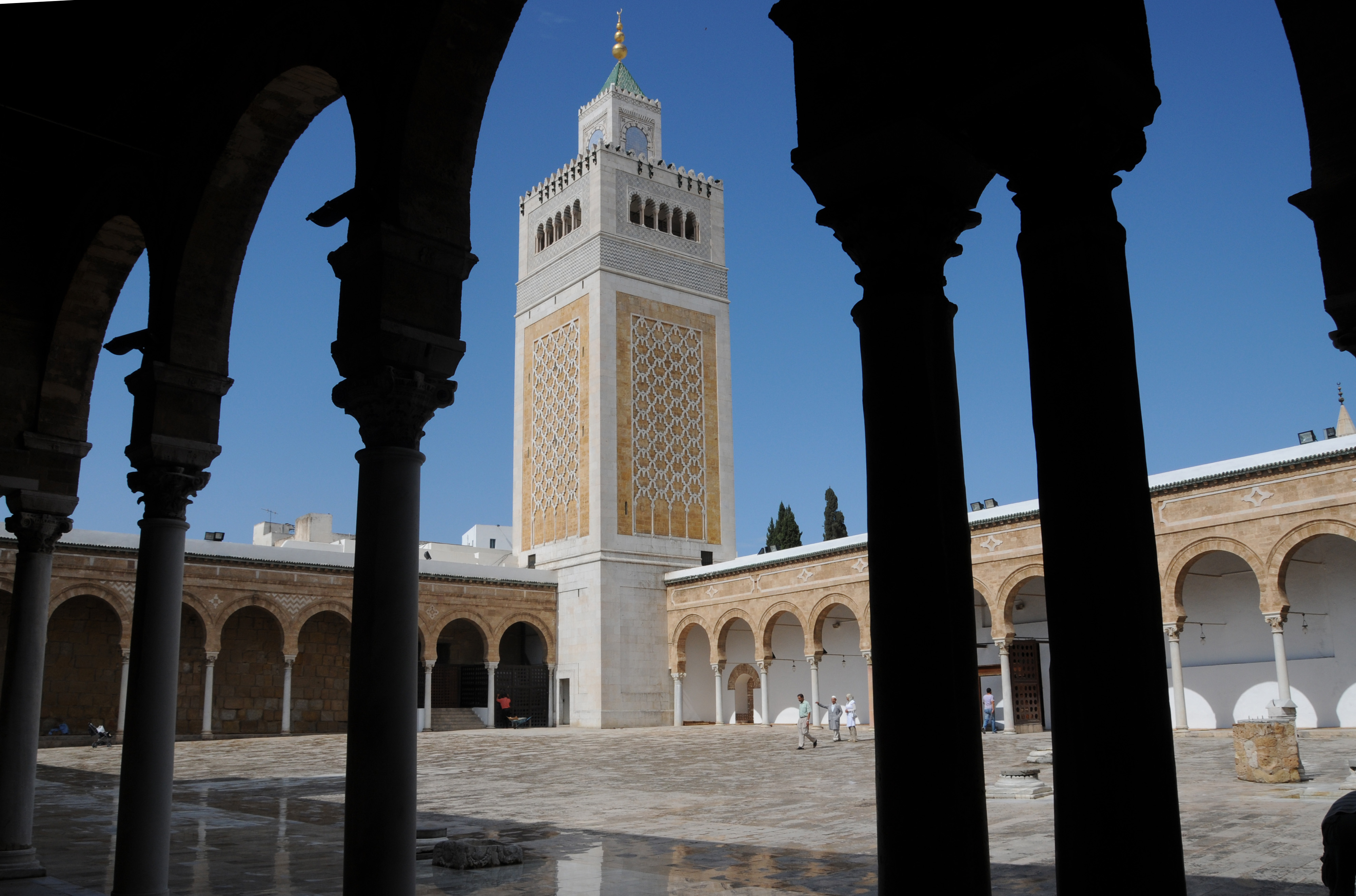
Zaytuna Mosque

The main and oldest of them is the Al-Zaytuna Mosque, founded in 689 and built in 732 and is in the heart of the Medina. Practicing the Maliki rite as the vast majority of Tunisia's Mosques. It was completely rebuilt in 864 and is a prestigious place of worship, and was long an important place of culture and knowledge with the University of Ez-Zitouna on the premises until the independence of Tunisia. It still hosts the main ceremonies marking the dates on the Muslim calendar and is regularly attended by the president.

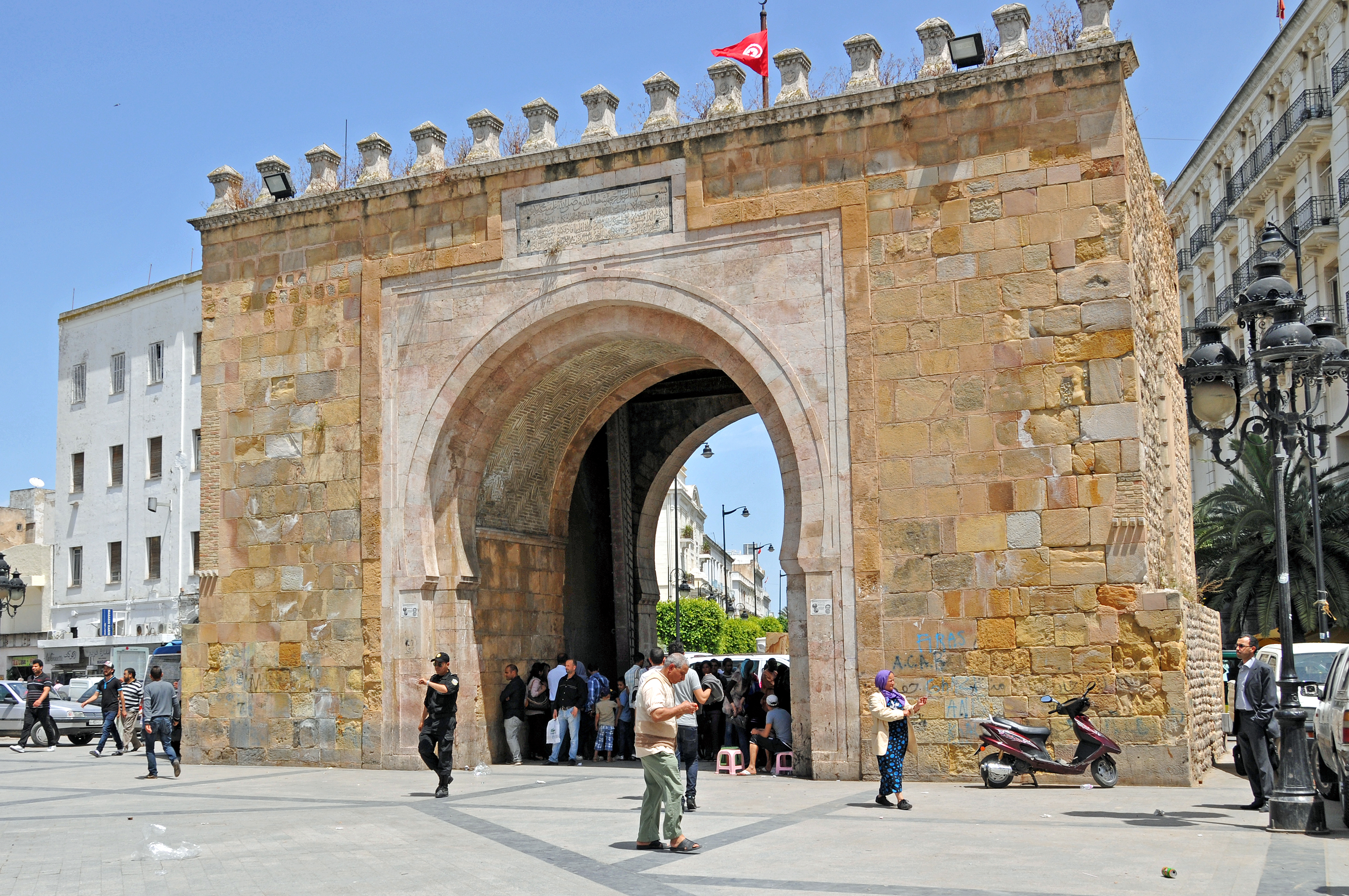
Bab el Bhar

The medina contains most of the major mosques in the capital which were built before the advent of the French protectorate. The mosque in the Kasbah, was founded in 1230. Practicing the Hanafi rite since 1584, it is recognisable mainly by the dome as well as its minaret, similar to the Koutoubia in Marrakesh and is the highest in the city. Ksar Mosque, also of the Hanafi rite, is located in front of Dar Hussein (Bab Menara) and was built in the 12th century. The Hammouda Pasha Mosque, built in 1655, is the second mosque built by the Hanafi rite in Tunis. Youssef Dey Mosque operated primarily as a public speaking venue before becoming a real mosque in 1631. The Sidi Mahrez Mosque is the largest mosque Hanafi mosque in terms of area but not the tallest. Built in 1692, it resembles the Ottoman Süleymaniye Mosque in Istanbul. The Saheb Ettabaâ Mosque, built between 1808 and 1814 was the last mosque built by the Tunis Husseinites before the French occupation.

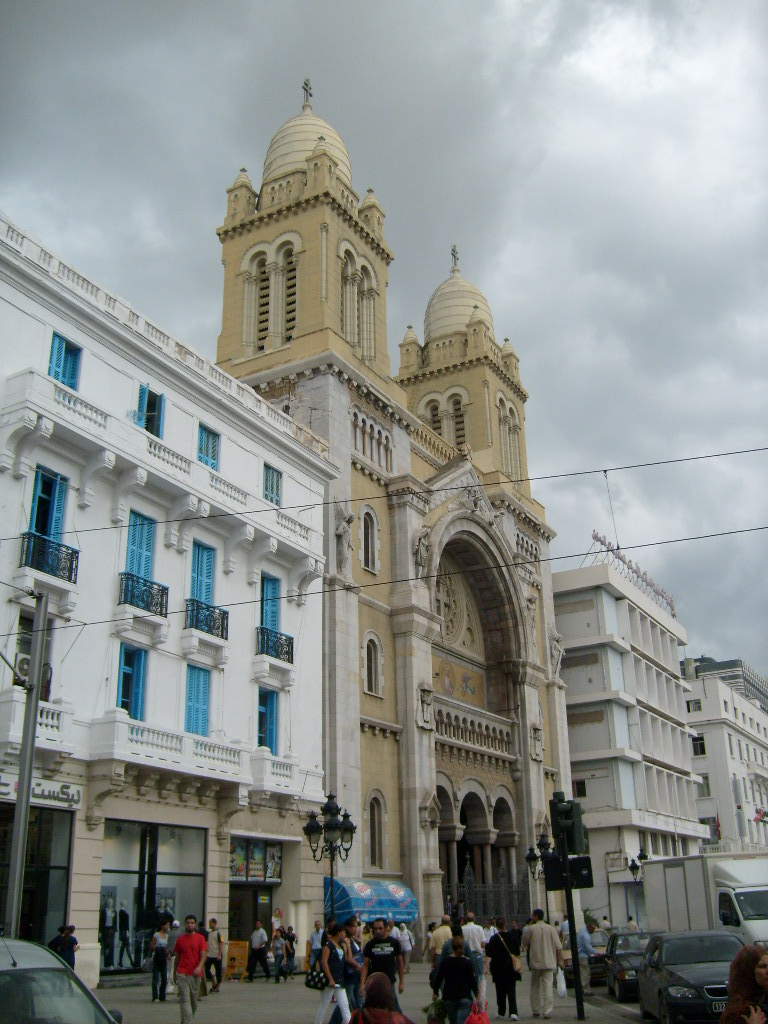
Cathedral of St. Vincent de Paul

The presence of modern churches in Tunis is also testimony to the French presence for half a century. Tunis is the seat of the Diocese of Tunis, with the seat located at the Cathedral of St Vincent de Paul, The church was built in 1897 on the site of the old Christian cemetery of Saint-Antoine. This includes a network of Catholic buildings, including the Church of St. Joan of Arc, but also with the Protestant Reformed Church and the Anglican church Saint-Georges.

Greeks used to enjoy an important presence in the city since ancient times. Tunis is the headquarters of the Greek Orthodox Holy Archdiocese of Carthage with jurisdiction over Algeria, Mauritania, Morocco, and Tunisia. It belongs to the Patriarchate of Alexandria and All Africa, and its cathedral, small school, and other buildings are in Central Tunis. In total, there are three Greek Orthodox and two Russian Orthodox parishes in Tunisia. The Coptic Orthodox Church of Alexandria also maintains jurisdiction in Tunisia. The small Orthodox community is centred around the Greek Orthodox Church (1862), managed by the Greek Embassy and the Russian Orthodox Church (1957), reflecting the presence in Tunisia of a small colony of Russian immigrants.

Judaism, meanwhile, enjoys a long tradition of presence in the city despite the emigration of a large part of the community after independence. Among the places of worship are Beit Yaakov Synagogue and especially the Great Synagogue of Tunis, built at the end of the 1940s to replace the former Great Synagogue which was demolished as part of the Jewish redevelopment area, the Hara.

=== Parks and greenery ===
Tunis has some large parks, many of which were installed at the end of the 19th century by the authorities of the French protectorate. The largest Park, Belvédère Park, which was founded in 1892, overlooks Lake Tunis. It is the oldest public park in the country and is built in the landscape style common to France. The park covers an area of more than one hundred hectares across roads that can be explored on foot or by car. It is also home to Tunis Zoo, which houses African fauna, and the Museum of Modern Art.

Habib Thameur garden in Tunis has a central pond and flower beds. The Gorjani garden is an English garden located southwest of the city, which notably takes an irregular form, partly due to the steep topography of the land.

== Culture ==
=== Museums ===
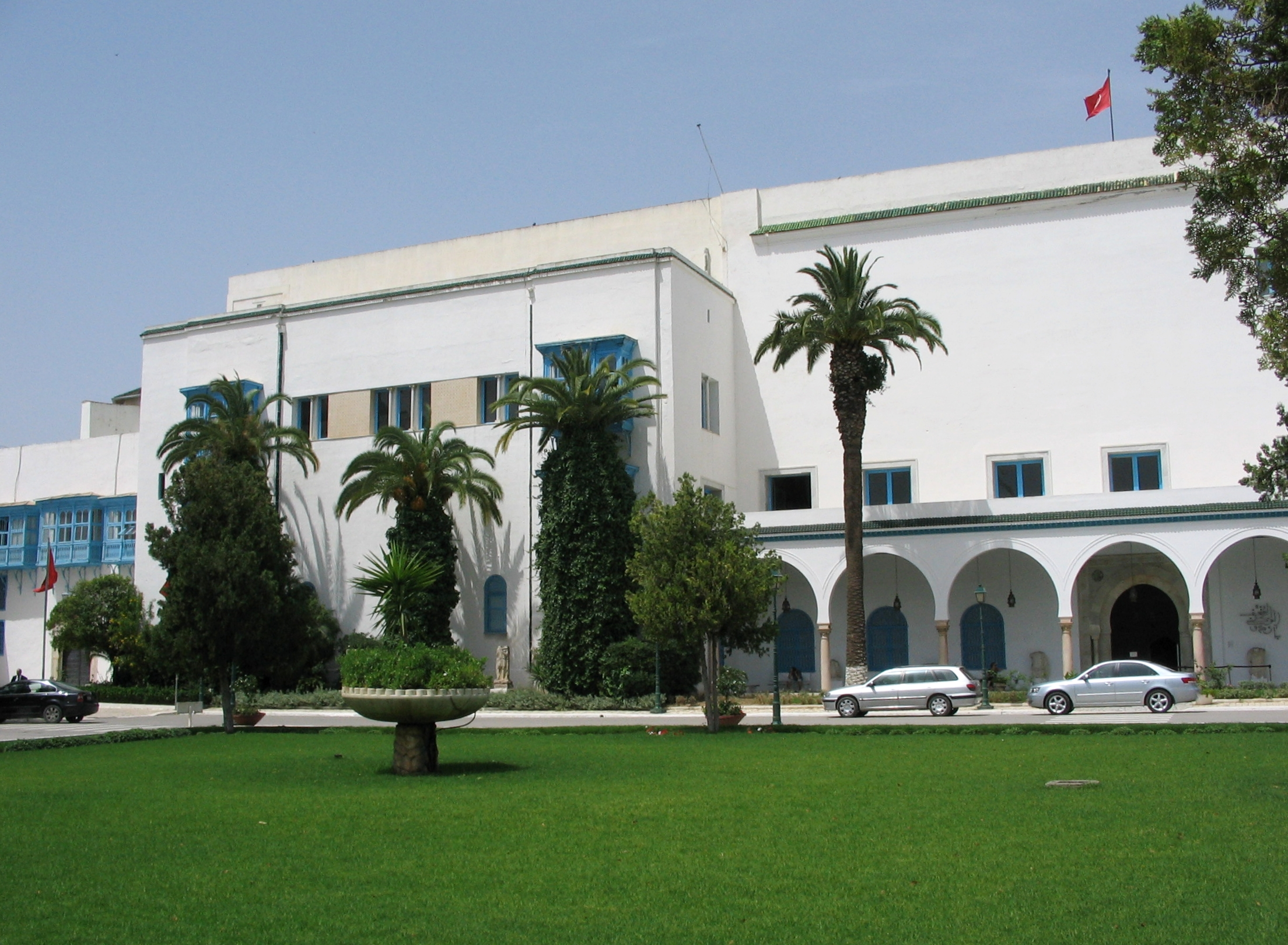
Bardo National Museum

Located in an old beylical palace (the palace of the Bey of Tunis since the end of the 18th century), the Bardo National Museum is the most important archaeological museum in the Maghreb, and has one of the richest Roman mosaic collections in the world. Its collections developed rapidly because of numerous archaeological discoveries in the surrounding territory.

In 1964, the Dar Ben Abdallah, a palace probably dating back to the 18th century, became the seat of the capital's Museum of Arts and Popular Traditions. In its exposition halls, it holds numerous traditional items, witnesses of the everyday lives of families of the Medina quarter.

The Museum of the National Movement is situated in Dar Maâkal Az-Zaïm, which was the residence of nationalist Habib Bourguiba for the entirety of the fight for independence. After the advent of independence, a museum was built there to relate the details of the national struggle between 1938 and 1952.

The National Military Museum, opened in 1989 in the suburbs west of the city, holds a collection of 23,000 weapons, 13,000 of which date back to the 19th century, and some of which were used by the Tunisian troops during the Crimean War.

=== Music ===
Tunis holds some of the most prestigious musical institutions in the country. The Rachidia was founded in 1934 to safeguard Arab music, and in particular to promote Tunisian and malouf music. The group is made up of 22 members, both instrumental players and choral musicians.

The Musical Troupe of the City of Tunis was created in 1954 by Salah El Mahdi. In 1955 he placed his student Mohamed Saâda in charge of the ensemble, which at that time included the best artists, and later merged with the ensemble of Radio Tunis. This group contributed to the rise to stardom of numerous Tunisian singers, including Oulaya.

The Association of Arab Orchestra of the City of Tunis began its activities at the end of April 1982, as a workshop linked to the cultural center of the city. It worked on promoting Arab music, on music education and training, and on cooperation with various partners both in Tunisia and abroad. The Tunisian Symphony Orchestra, created in 1969 by the Minister of Culture, has also produced monthly concerts at the Municipal Theater and in various cultural spaces in the city.

=== Performing arts ===
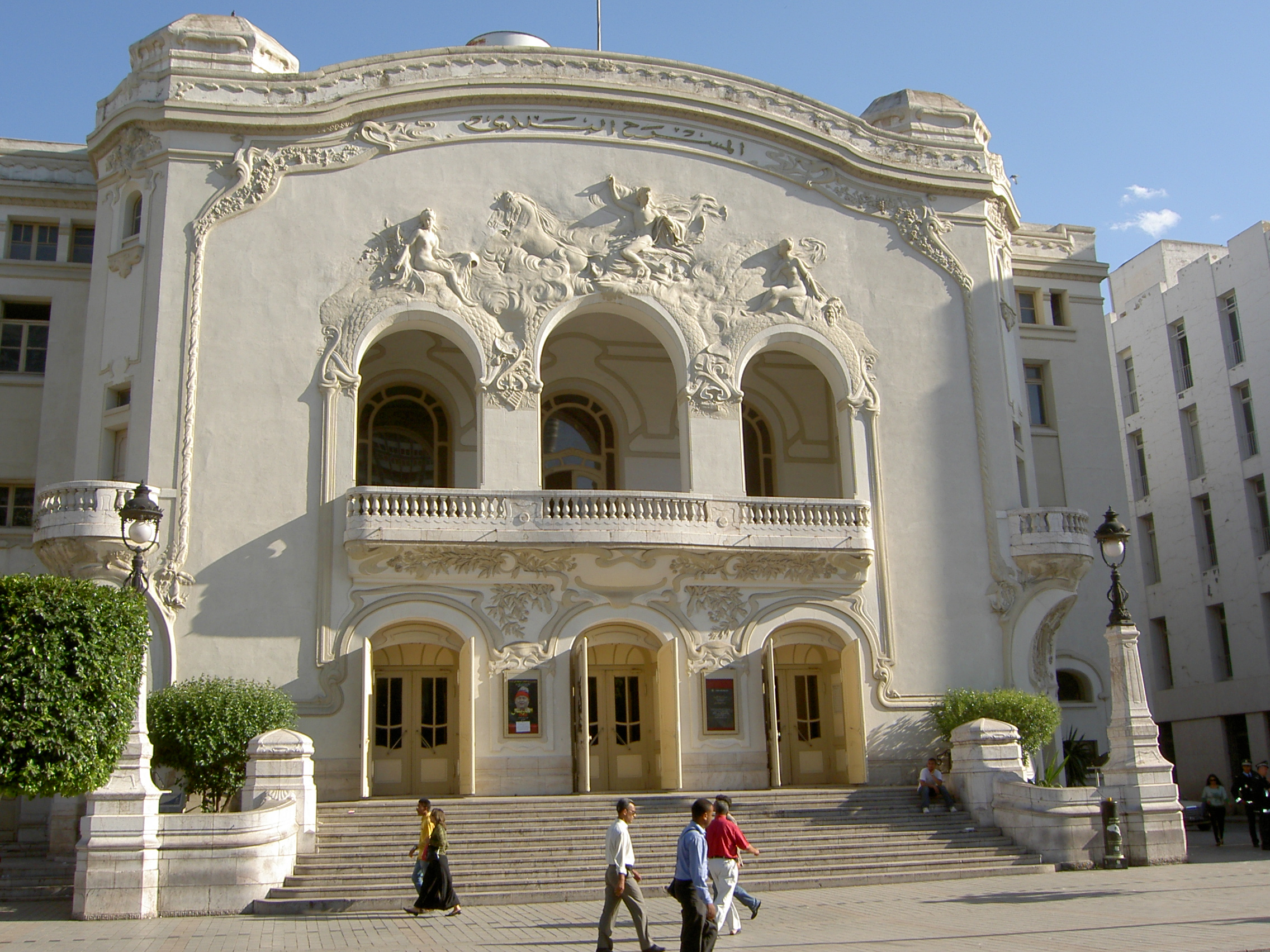
Tunis Municipal Theatre

Tunis is a center of Tunisian culture. The Théâtre municipal de Tunis, opened on 20 November 1902, showcases opera, ballet, symphonic concerts, drama, etc. On the stage of this theater, many performances are regularly given by Tunisian, Arabic, and international actors. The National Theatre of Tunisia is an important public enterprise in Tunis, and since 1988 been located in the Khaznadar palace (dating from the middle of the 19th century and situated in the Halfaouine quarter), renamed "Theater Palace". In 1993, it also took possession of the former movie theater Le Paris, with a 350-person seating capacity. During each "cultural season" (from October 1 to 30 June) the theater holds over 80 events. The Al Hamra theater was the second theater to be opened in Tunis, situated on El Jazira Road. Al Hamra was one of the most famous theaters in the capital during the 1930s and 1940s. After being closed for fifteen years, it was turned into a small theater in 1986, and since 2001 has housed the first Arab-African center for theater training and research. One should also note the El Teatro and Étoile du Nord theater groups.

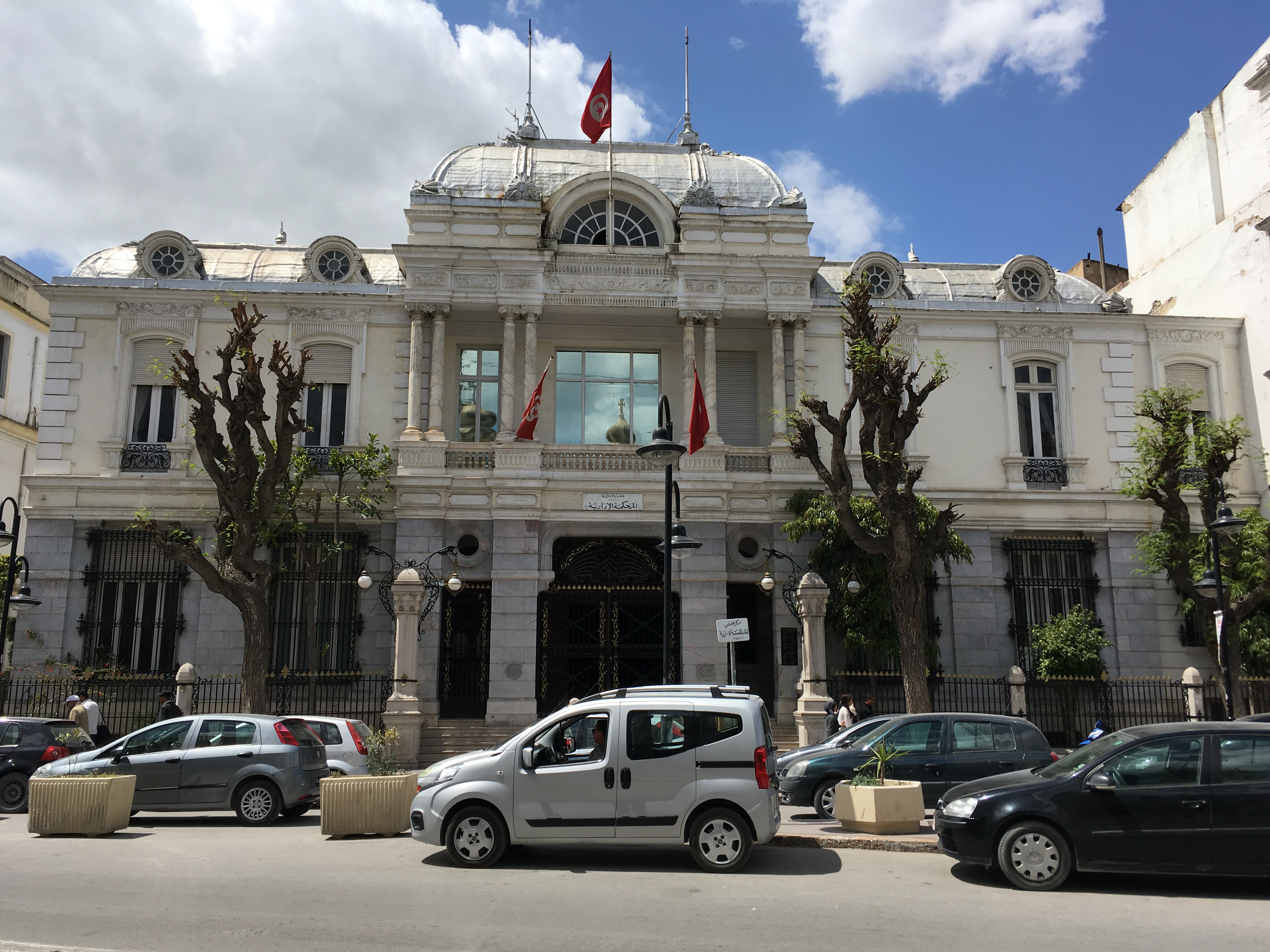
Tunis Old Tribunal

Other arts are also represented in the capital. The National Center of the Arts established the puppet theatre in 1976. The National School of Circus Arts was founded following a meeting between the Director of the National Theater and the Director General of the National Center for Arts of Châlons-en-Champagne (France) in 1998. In addition, various small theatres and cultural centers are scattered throughout the city and display various artistic performances.

=== Film ===
Film producers and cinema have long been present in the city of Tunis. The first animated film was shown in Tunis by the Lumiere brothers as early as 1896. The first screenings were held the following year and the first cinema, the Omnia Pathé, opened in October 1908. The first film club opened in Tunis in 1946 and the Globe, in 1965. The Carthage Film Festival is the oldest established film festival in Africa, running biennially until 2014 and annually thereafter.

In 1990, Ferid Boughedir shot the notable film Halfaouine Child of the Terraces in Halfaouine district. The films The English Patient (1996) and The Last Days of Pompeii (2003) were also shot in studios in Tunis.

=== Festivals ===
The city holds several festivals each year, of which the largest is the International Festival of Carthage which takes place in July and August. Founded in 1964, much of the festival is held in Carthage in an old amphitheater with a capacity of 7,500 seats. It hosts the performances of singers, musicians, actors, dancers, and films on display on outdoor screens.

== Education ==
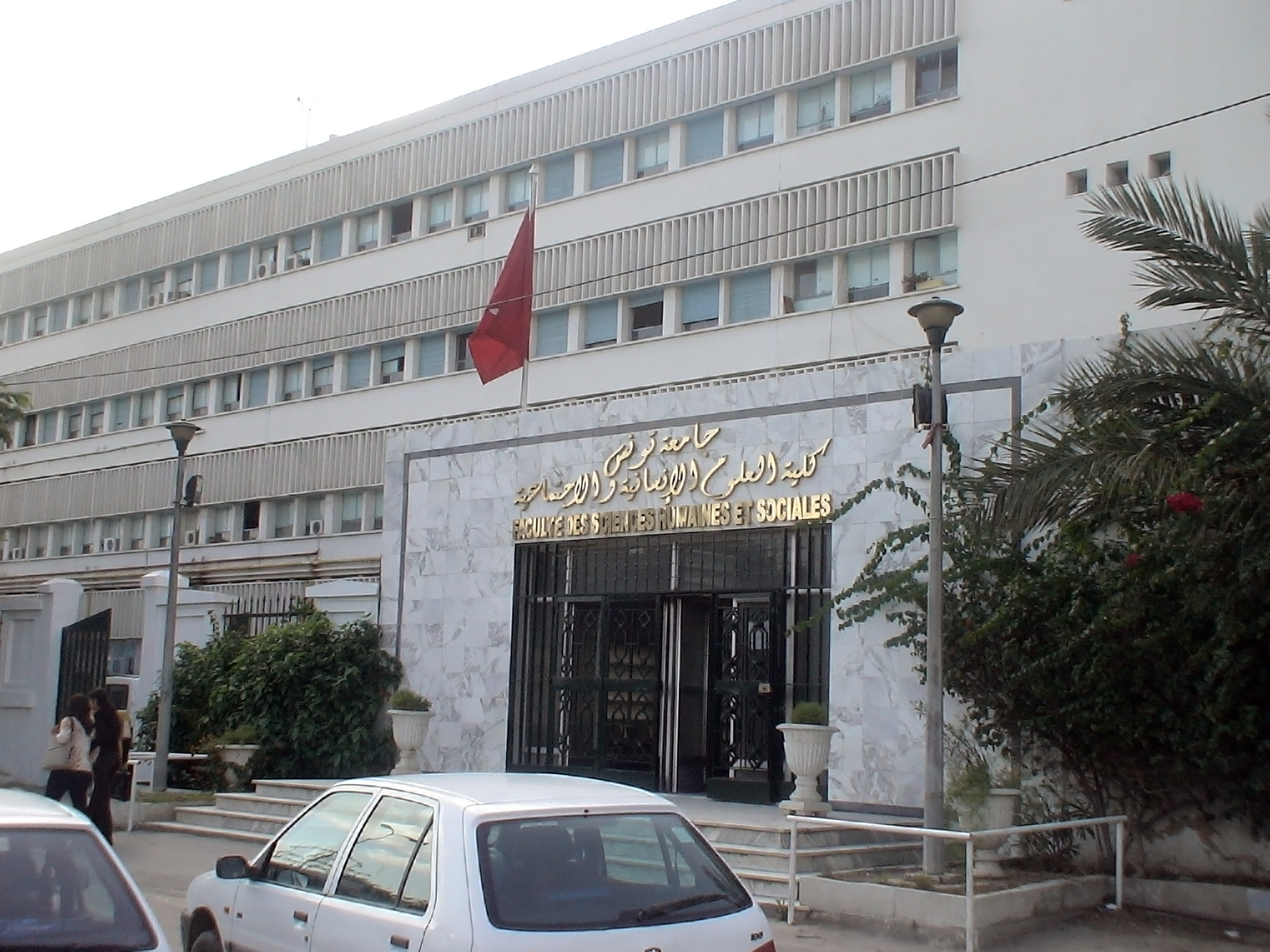
Faculty of the Human and Social Sciences

Tunis and its suburbs have many of the major Tunisian universities including the University of Tunis, Tunisia Private University, University of Ez-Zitouna, the University of Tunis – El Manar, the University of Carthage and the Manouba University. It therefore has the highest concentration of students in Tunisia, with a student population of 75,597 as of 2006.

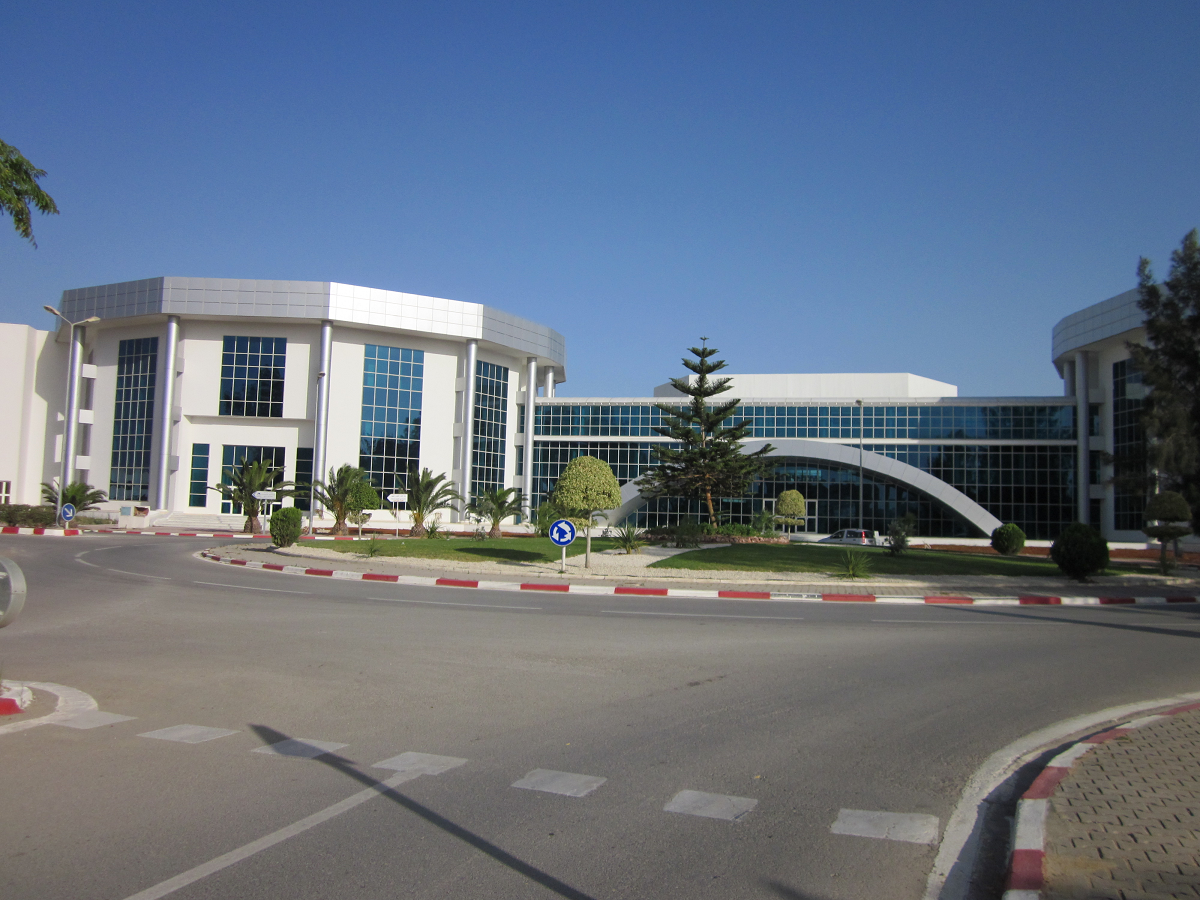
Higher School of Communication of Tunis

There are also a number of other post-secondary institutions, such as the National School of Engineers of Tunis, the National School of Science, the Graduate School of Communications of Tunis, and the Higher Institute of Technological Studies in Communications of Tunis. In addition, private training institutes include the Open University of Tunis, the Central University Private Business Administration and Technology, the Graduate School of Private Engineering and Technology, and the North African Institute of Economics and Technology.

Among the high schools in the capital, the best-known are the Lycée de la Rue du Pacha (founded 1900), Lycée Bab El Khadhra, Lycée de la Rue de Russie, Lycée Bourguiba (formerly Lycée Carnot de Tunis), and the Lycée Alaoui. Until independence, Sadiki College (founded 1875) and Khaldounia (founded 1896) were also among the most recognized. A legacy of the French presence in the country remains, and the city retains many French schools, the most important being the Lycée Pierre Mendes-France at Mutuelleville.

Students can pursue language studies at small private schools such as Sidi Bou Said Centre for Languages (Centre Sidi Bou Said de Langues et d'Informatique) in the picturesque Tunis suburb of Sidi Bou Said, next to the Sidi Bou Said TGM station that specializes in Arabic, offering classes in Modern Standard Arabic (MSA), classical Arabic, Tunisian Arabic and the various dialects of North Africa, the Gulf and the Levant.

=== Libraries ===
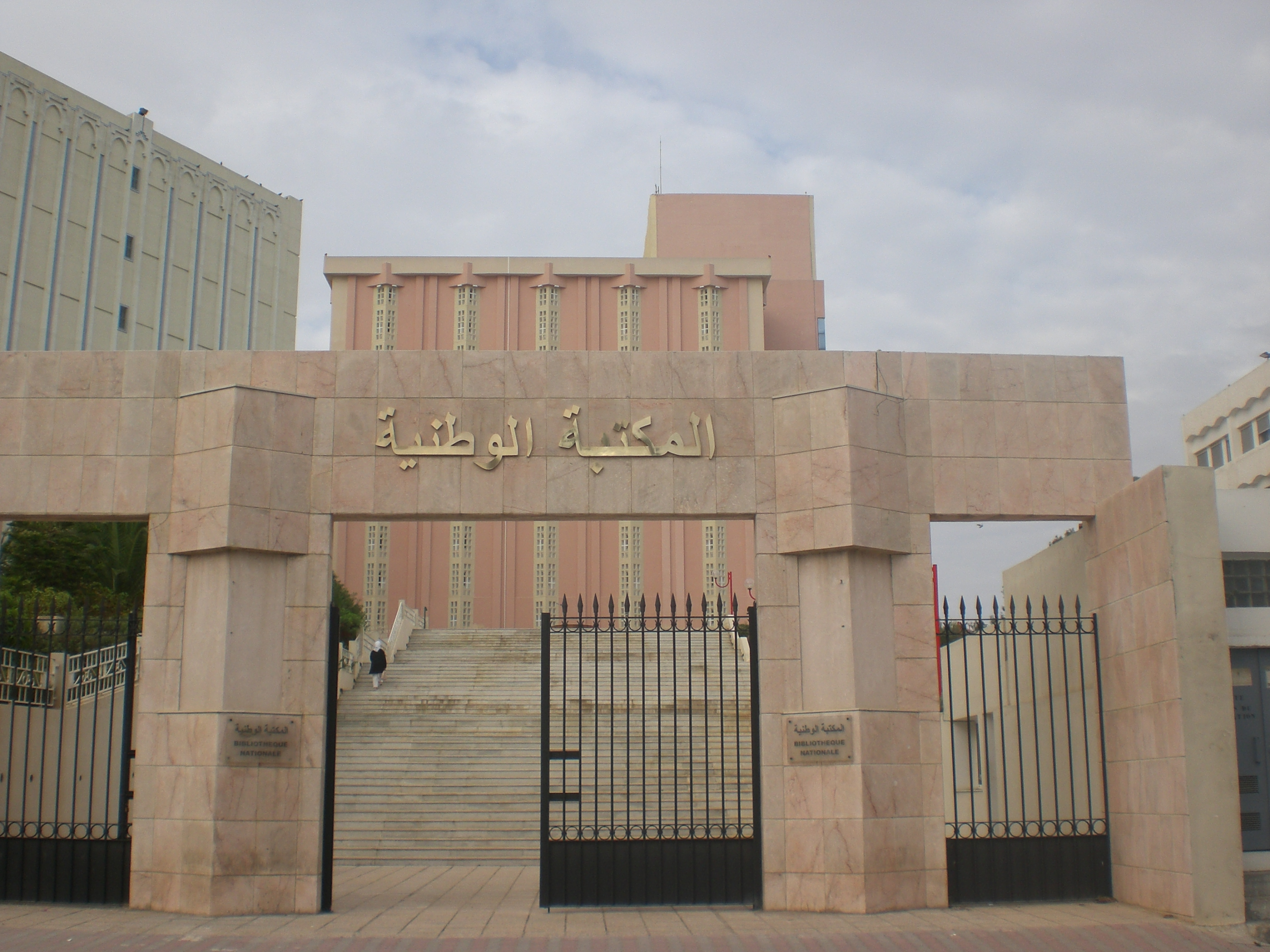
National Library of Tunisia

Tunis has some of the most important libraries in Tunisia including the National Library of Tunisia which was first installed in 1924 in the Medina, in a building built in 1810 by Hammouda Bey to serve as barracks for troops and then a jail. The library moved to its current location on Boulevard 9 April in 1938. The new building contains a reading room, conference room, laboratories, an exhibition gallery, a block of technical and administrative services, a restaurant, parking, and green space areas.

Housed in a former home of a Hafsid scholar, the library of the Khaldounia was founded in 1896 along with the creation of the educational institution. After independence and following the consolidation of programs of education, the association ceased operations but the library is now linked to the National Library, which provides for its management.

Built in the 17th century, the Dar Ben Achour also contains a library. Acquired in the late 1970s by the municipality of Tunis, the house was restored in 1983 into a library.

== In the arts ==
An engraving of a painting by Charles Bentley entitled Tunis, from the Saneeah Eftoor. was published in Fisher's Drawing Room Scrap Book, 1838 with a poetical illustration by Letitia Elizabeth Landon that comments on the potential the city has for development.

== Transport ==
=== Public transport ===
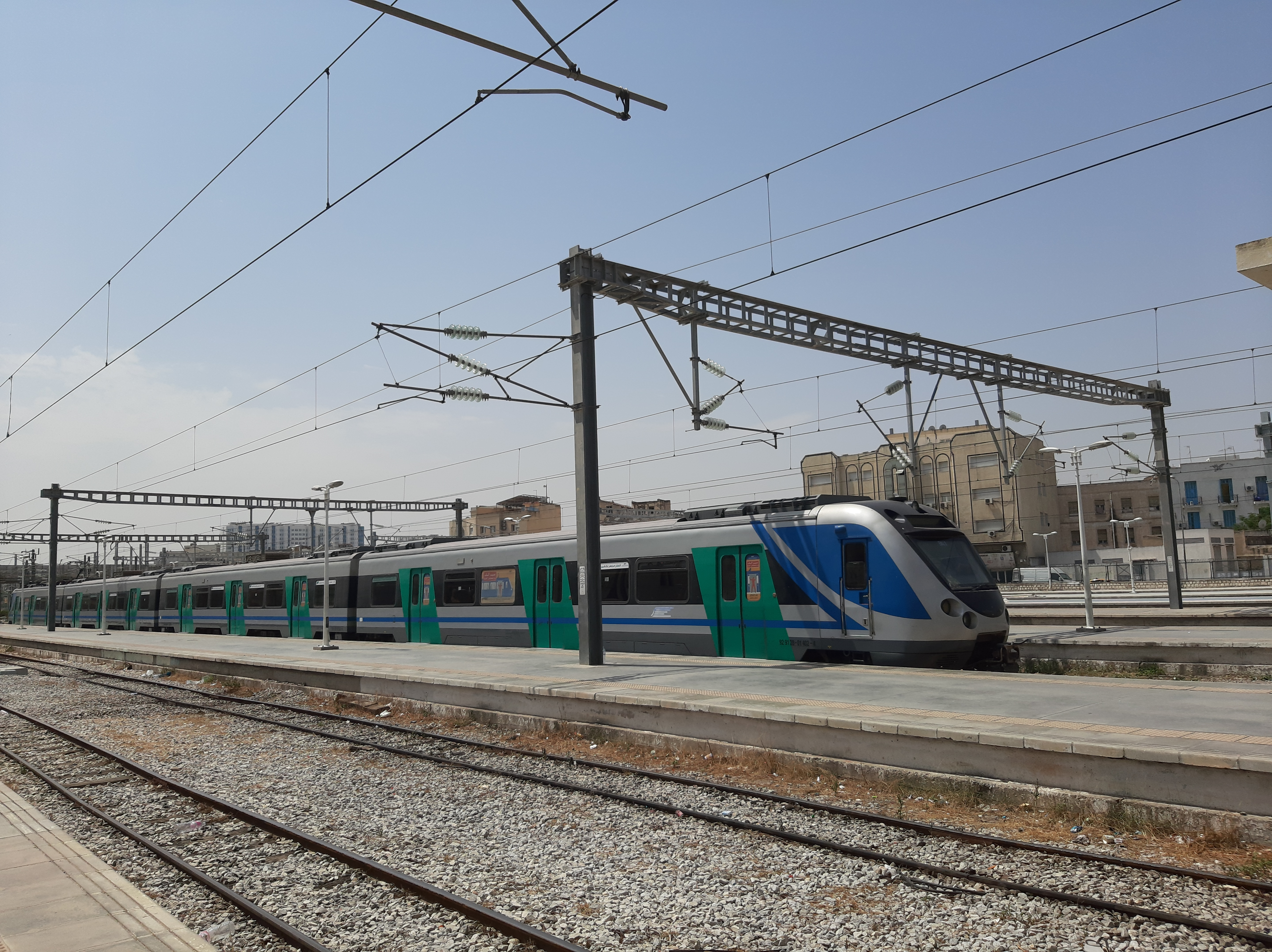
Tunis south surb train

The growing metropolitan area is served by an extensive network of public transportation including buses, an above-ground light rail system (le Metro), as well a regional train line (the TGM) that links the city center to its closest northern suburbs. Multi-lane autoroutes surround the city and serve the increasing number of privately owned cars one encounters in Tunisia.

The Tunis area is served by the métro léger (Ar.: المترو الخفيف لمدينة تونس) and TGM (Tunis-Goulette-Marsa), as well as bus services, and is linked to other places in Tunisia by SNCFT, the national railways. The important transport authorities are the Société des Transports de Tunis (STT) and the Ministry of Transport (Airports)

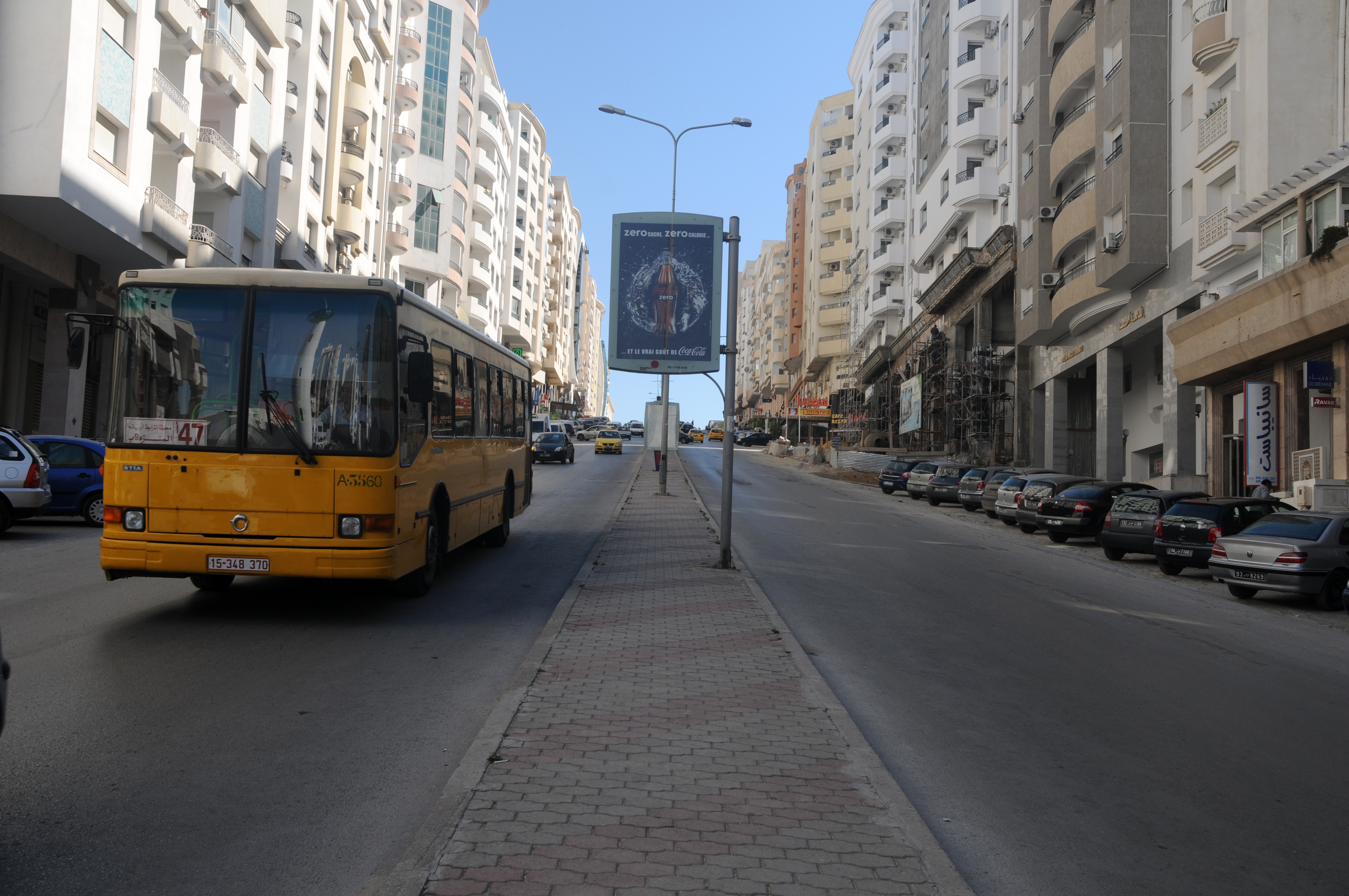
Tunis bus

The city has, as of the beginning of the 21st century, a public transportation system developed under the management of the Société des transports de Tunis (STT). In addition to some 200 bus routes, the first light rail line opened in 1985. The Métro léger de Tunis network has extended gradually since then to reach the suburbs. The capital is also linked to its northern suburbs by the railway line that crosses the lake, dividing the lake into two. New mass transit was planned for Greater Tunis in 2009. This was the RTS (rapid rail network), the local equivalent of the Paris RER, which was to carry tens of thousands of travellers from the distant suburbs of Tunis to the centre by using either existing tracks or new tracks yet to be built.

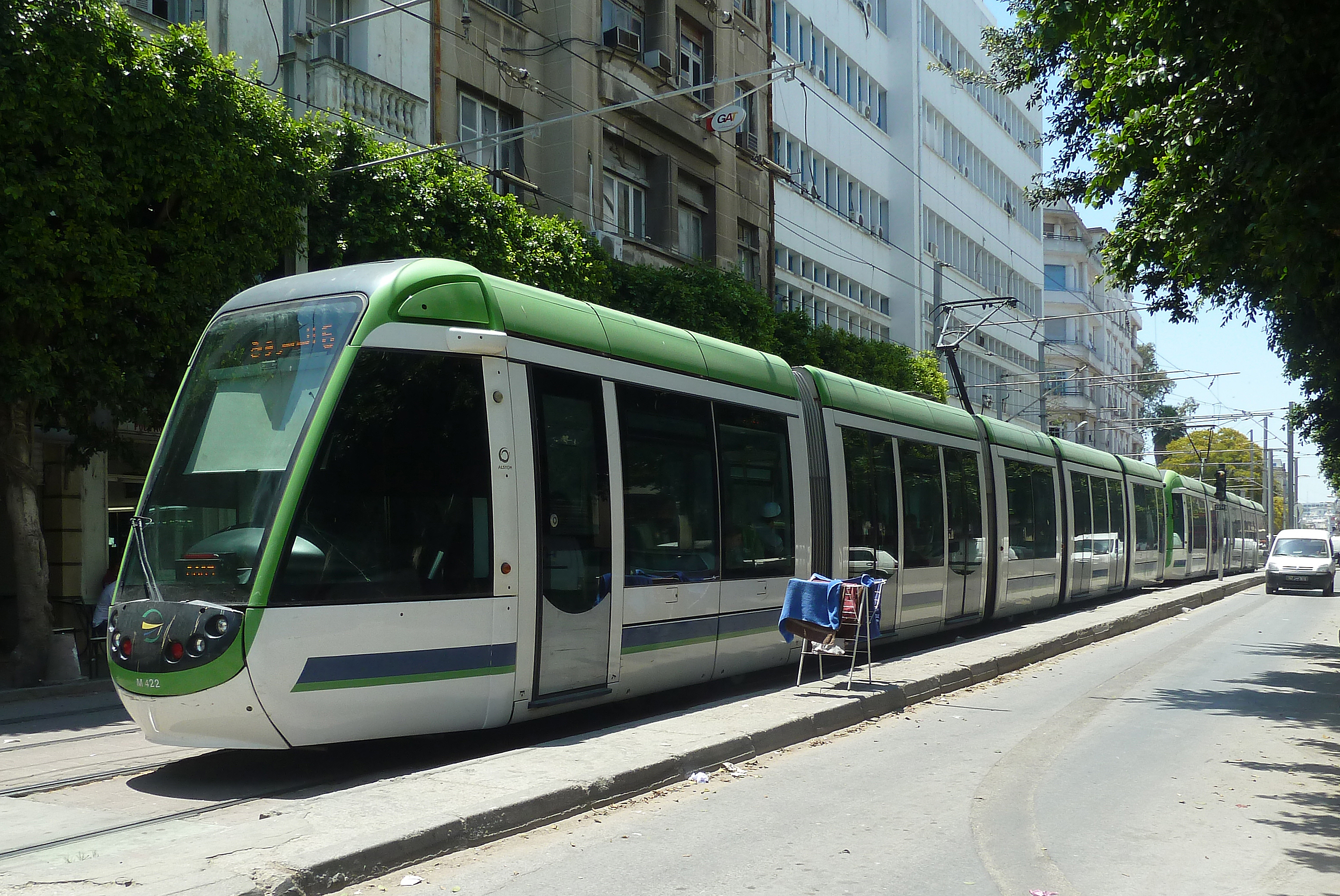
Tunis Light Metro

The plan was for lines based on certain criteria such as population density and the lack of coverage for a given area. Among the priority lines were: Tunis-Borj Cédria (23 km) where modernization and electrification are already planned; Tunis-Mohamedia-Fouchana (19.4 km); Tunis-Manouba-Mnihla (19.2 km); Tunis-Ezzouhour-Sidi Hassine Séjoumi (13.9 km). In addition, the TGM will be integrated into the light-rail network and a new line built around Ayn Zaghouan and Bhar Lazrag (8.4 km). Such an operation would require the upgrading of the docks' TGM stations so that they become suitable for light rail trains. Among other projects are a line to the city of Ennasr (8.4 km) and the extension of the Tunis-Ettadhamen to Mnihla (1.7 km). For its part, the south light-rail line was extended in November 2008 to El Mourouj with a length of 6.8 kilometres (4.2 miles). The total length of the network will eventually be in the range of 84 km (52 mi).

=== Infrastructure ===
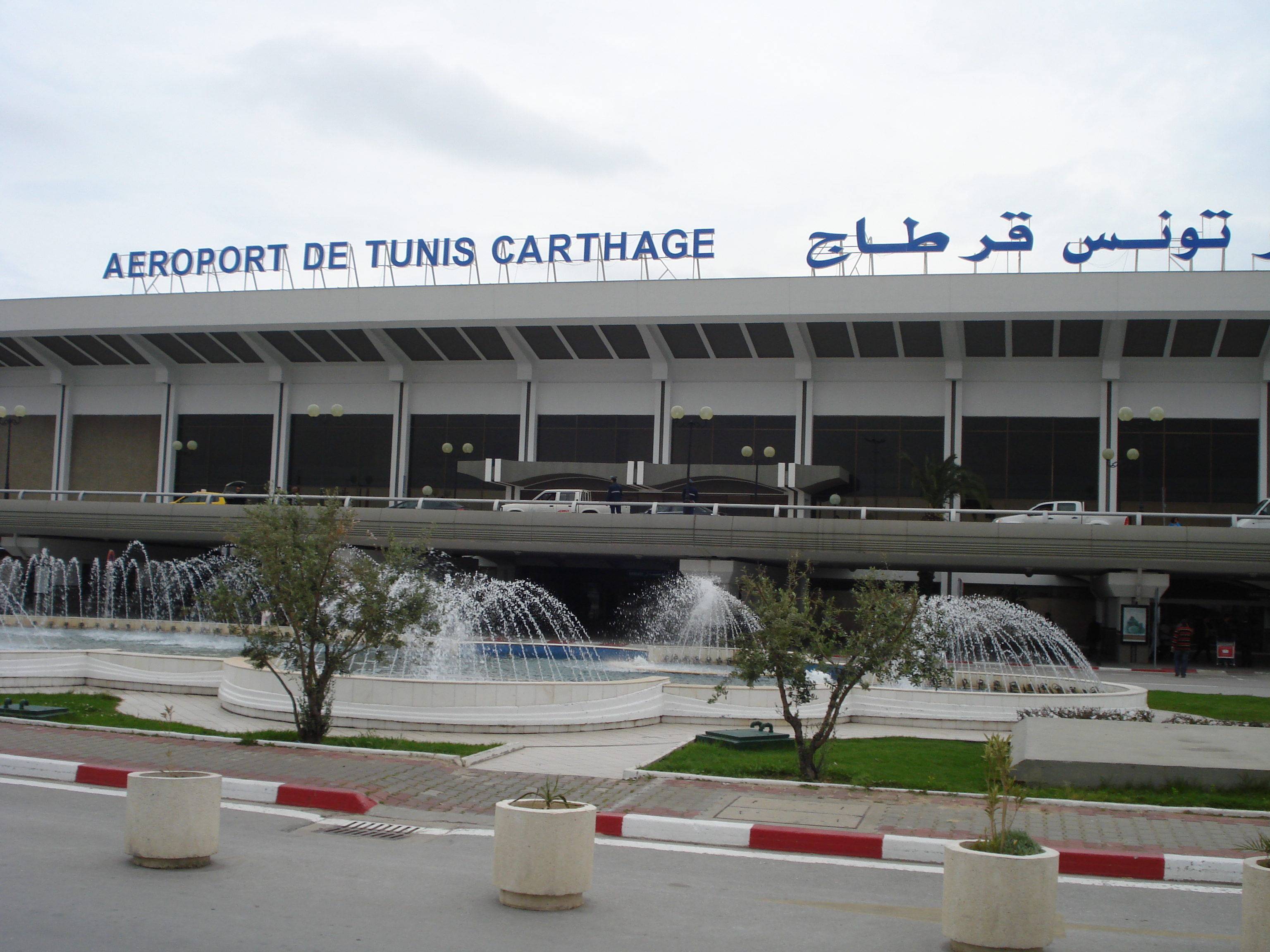
Tunis-Carthage International Airport

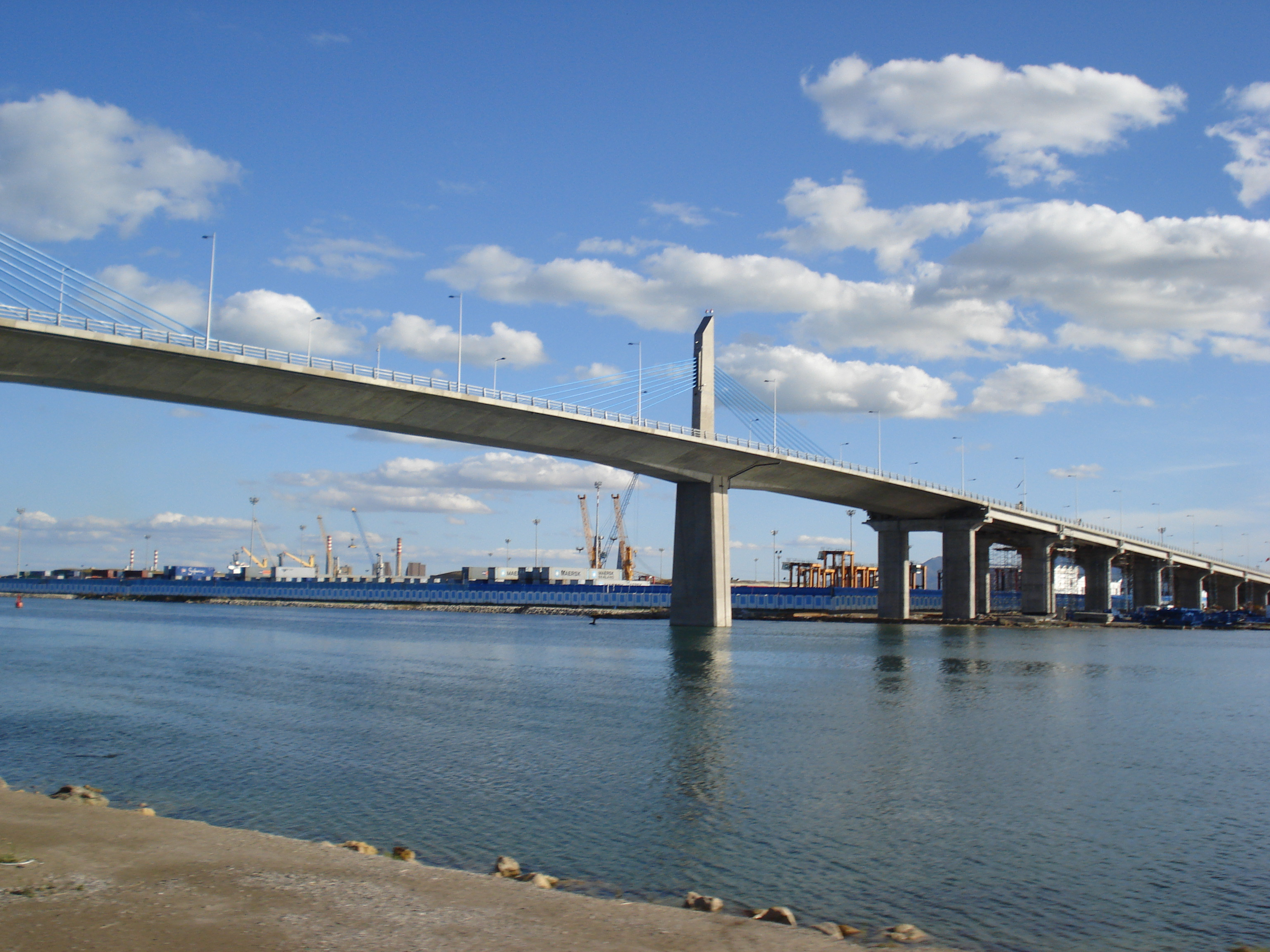
Radès Bridge

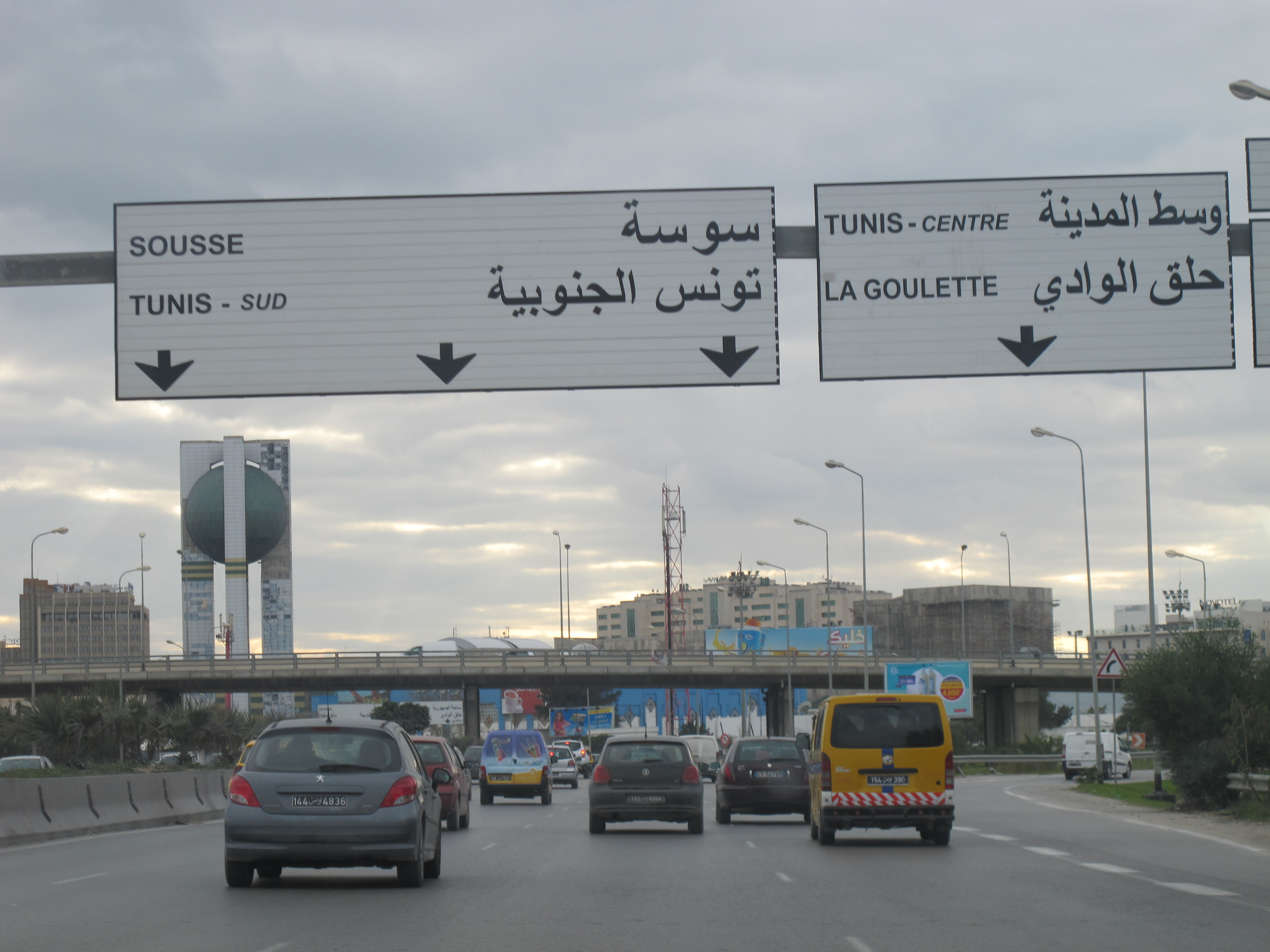
Tunis road

Tunis is served by Tunis-Carthage International Airport, located 8 kilometers (5.0 mi) northeast of downtown, which began operating in 1940 under the name of Tunis El Aouina.

After independence, in the 1960s, the National Board of Seaports, which supports all ports in the country, modernized the infrastructure of the port of Tunis. In the 21st Century, the port of Tunis underwent further transformation with a marina as part of the redevelopment district of La Petite Sicile. Tunis is the starting point from which the main roads and all highways that serve different parts of the country of Tunis originate. This city has a high density of traffic because vehicle ownership is rising at 7.5% per year. The capital is home to approximately 40% of the cars in Tunisia, with 700,000 cars on average used in the city per day. In this context, major road infrastructure (bridges, interchanges, roads, etc..) was initiated in the late 1990s to decongest the main areas of the capital. The main roads to other Tunisian cities include: Autoroute A1, Tunis-Sfax; Autoroute A3, Tunis-Oued Zarga; and Autoroute A4, Tunis-Bizerte. Also, as part of the major infrastructure project, the city's traffic lights were increased from 5,000 to 7,500.

== Sport ==
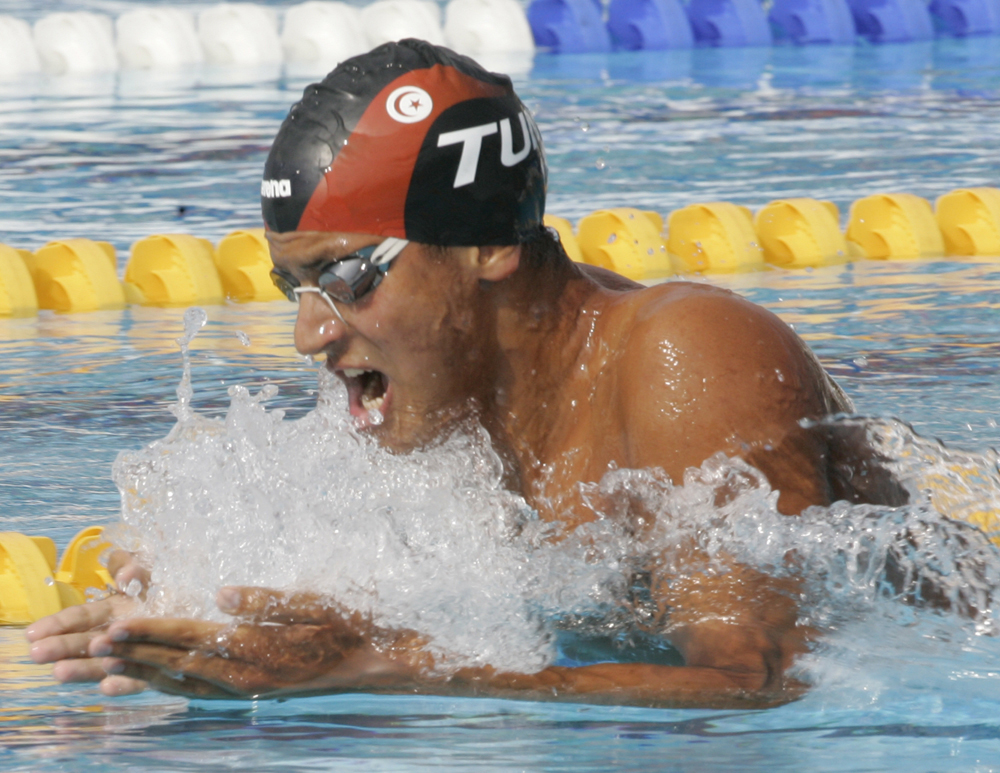
Oussama Mellouli, gold medallist at the Beijing Summer Olympics and at the London Summer Olympics

At the beginning of the 20th century, a number of sports institutions were established in Tunis, particularly in school and college settings. In 1905 the Muslim Association of Tunisia brought together students from Lycée Alaoui and Sadiki College to organize gymnastics. A regional gymnastics competition was held in Tunis in 1912 with the participation of thousands of French gymnasts.

Football made its appearance in the capital on 15 September 1904, followed by the formal creation of the country's first league, the Racing Club Tunis, on 11 May 1905. It took some time to run properly, but it soon organized meetings between the teams in schools. The first took place on 9 June 1907, between teams from Lycée Alaoui and Lycée Carnot (1–1).

Football is not the only discipline to emerge. Between 1928 and 1955 the city hosted nine rounds of the Grand Prix of Tunis, where notable drivers such as Marcel Lehoux, Achille Varzi, Tazio Nuvolari and Rudolf Caracciola took part. The Grand Prix of Tunis has re-emerged since 2000. The city has also held the Mediterranean Games twice, in 1967 and 2001, and the international tennis tournament, the Tunis Open, which is included in the ATP Challenger Series. The 2005 World Championship final for men in team handball was played in Tunis.

In total, the governorate of Tunis registered 24,095 licenses for various clubs in the municipal area in 2007. Regarding international basketball, the city hosted the FIBA Africa Championship 1965 and the FIBA Africa Championship 1987.

Club	Stadium	Foundation	Championships of Football	Championships of volleyball	Championships of handball	Championships of basketball
Club Africain	Stade Olympique de Radès; Stade El Menzah	1920	12	7	8	2
Espérance Sportive de Tunis	Stade Olympique de Radès; Stade El Menzah	1919	20	15	24	3
Stade Tunisien	Stade Chedli Zouiten	1948	4	0	0	0

The Esperance Sportive de Tunis (EST), Club Africain (CA), and Stade Tunisien are the major sports clubs in the city. A symbolic class difference is present between the EST's and the CA's supporters, despite their playing at the same stadium. The EST is supported by the majority of the masses, while the CA, a poorer club, is supported by the others.

The first true sports facilities were managed under the French protectorate, as illustrated by the development of the Ksar Said racecourse and construction of the Stade Chedli Zouiten in the neighborhood of Belvedere, which had long been the main stadium in the capital before being supplanted by the Olympic stadium, Stade El Menzah, where EST and CA play their football today. The Olympic stadium and village area were built to accommodate the Mediterranean Games in 1967. A 60,000-seat stadium was also built in Radès for the Mediterranean Games in 2001 at an estimated cost of 170 million dinars, with nearly half of the loans financed by South Korean businessmen. The Olympic Village was financed by an investment estimated at 50 million dinars. In 2008, the government announced the start of construction of a large sports complex that will include several sports academies, a 20,000-seat stadium, and a swimming centre. Known as Tunis Sports City, it will expand around the lake of Tunis, on the road to La Marsa.

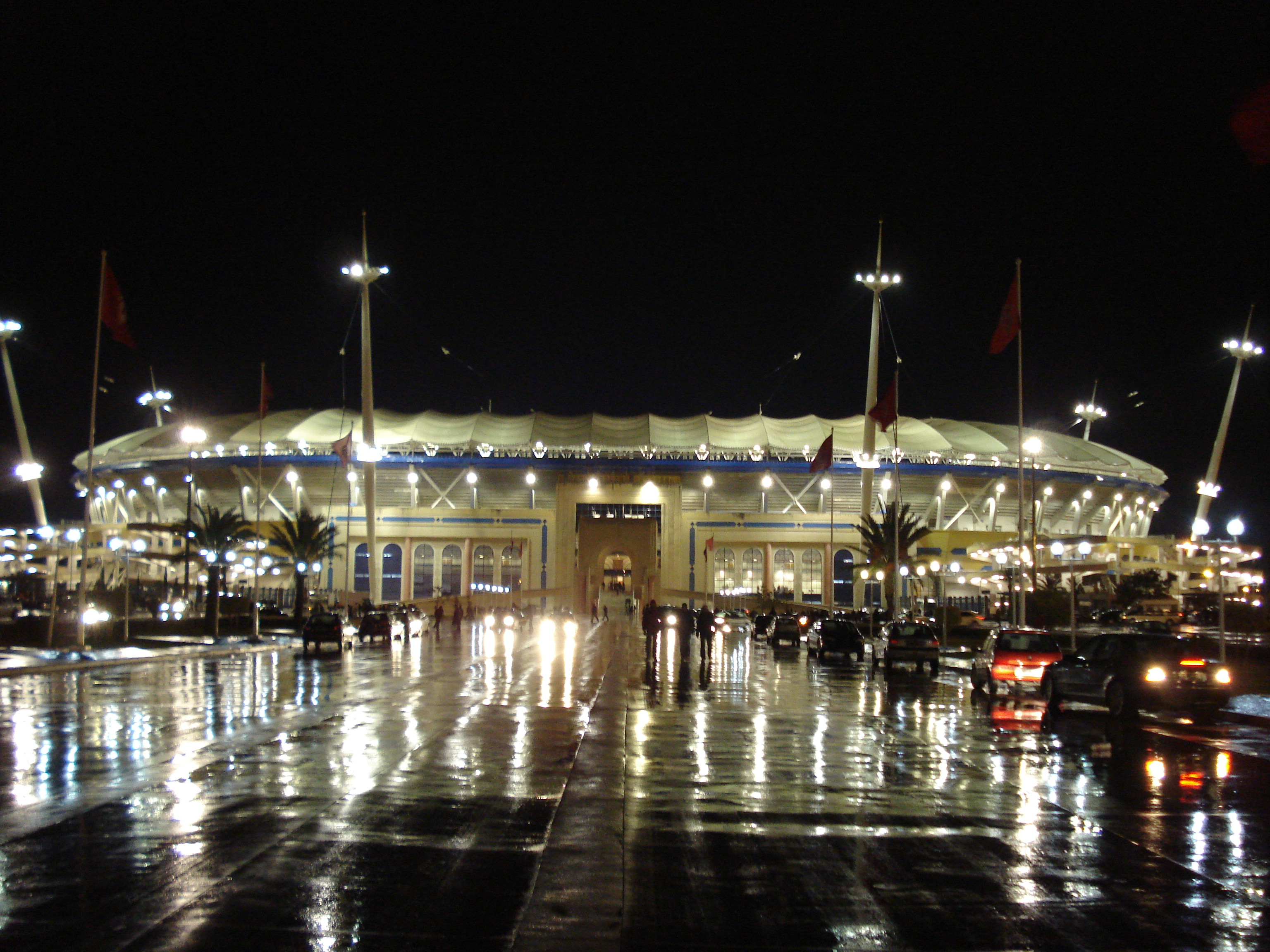
Stade Olympique de Radès

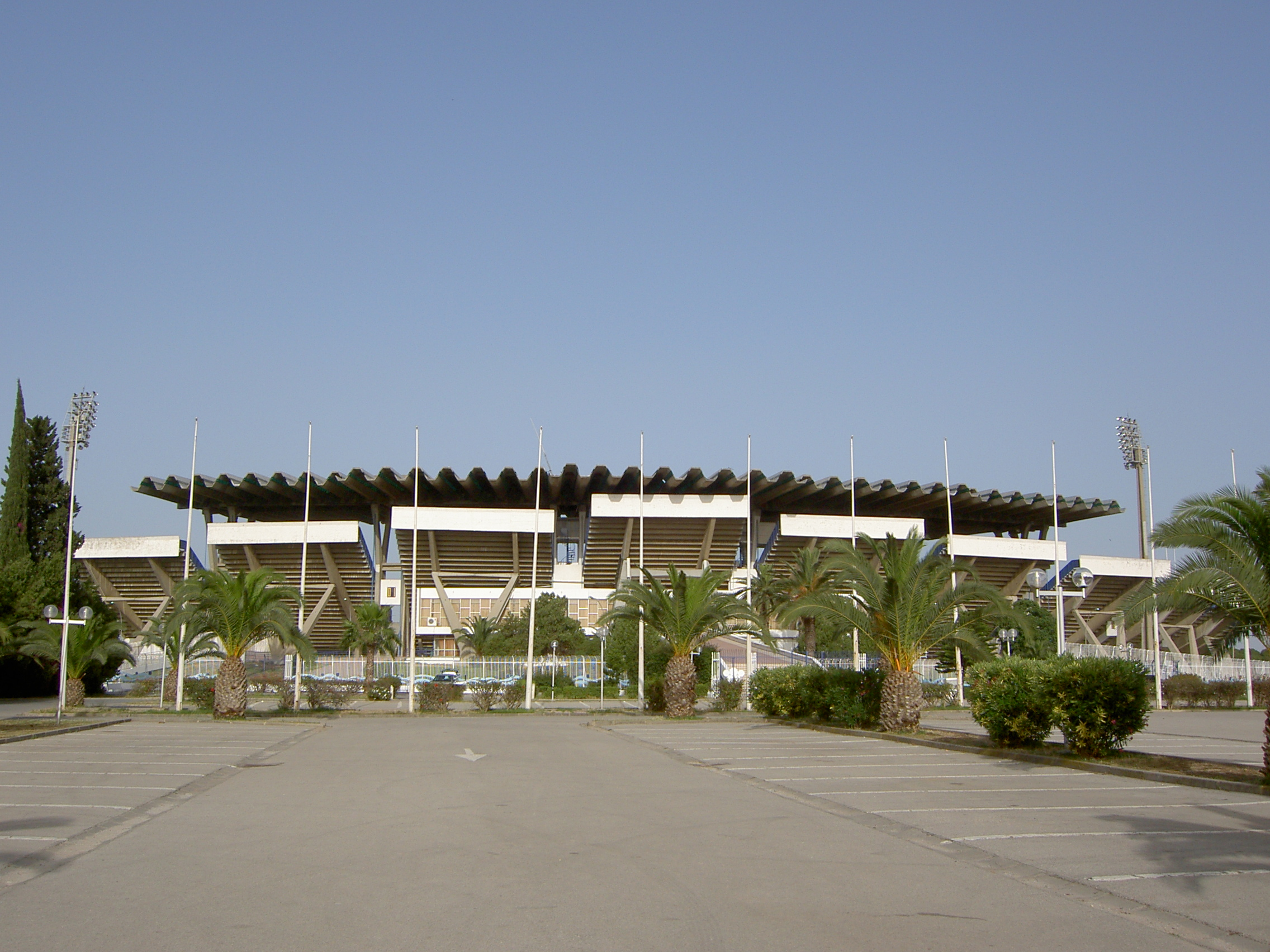
Stade El Menzah

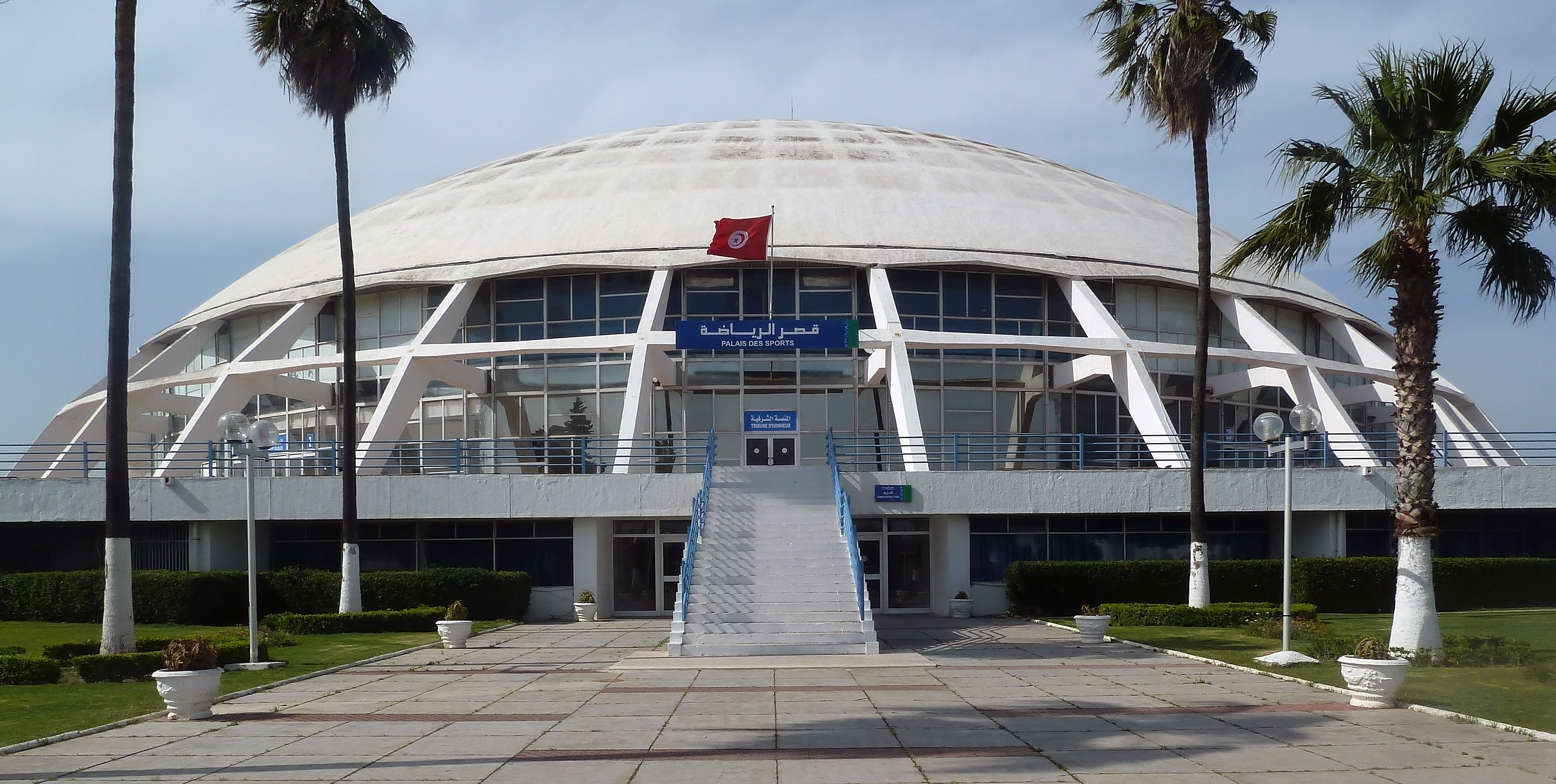
Palais des sports d'El Menzah

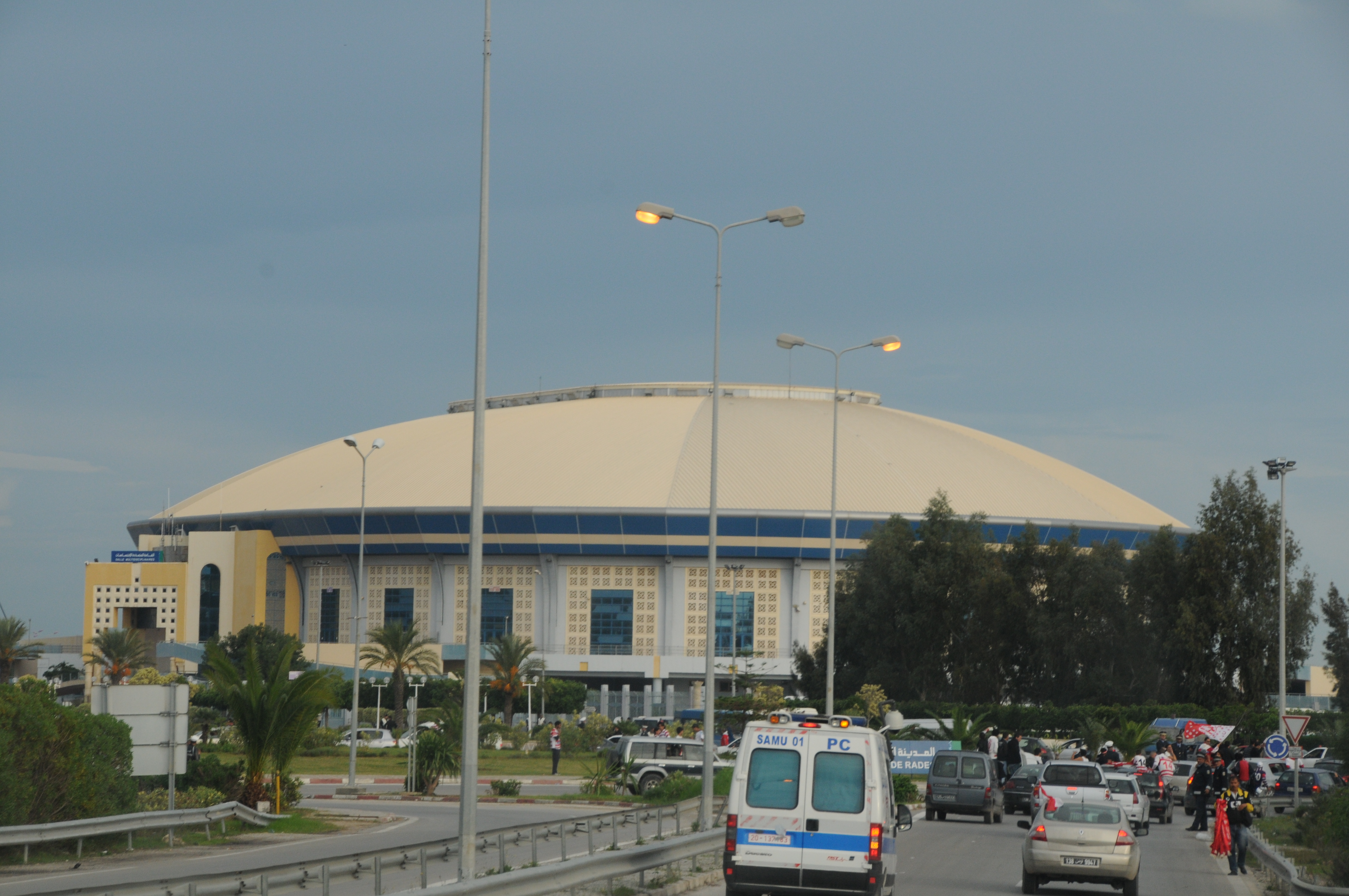
Salle Omnisport de Radès

== International relations ==
=== Twin towns and sister cities ===
Tunis is twinned with:

- Amman, Jordan
- Rio de Janeiro, Brazil
- Montreal, Canada
- Cologne, Germany
- Doha, Qatar
- Istanbul, Turkey
- Kuwait City, Kuwait
- Muscat, Oman
- Prague, Czech Republic
- Rabat, Morocco

=== Other cooperations ===
- Jeddah, Saudi Arabia
- Lisbon, Portugal
- Marseille, France
- Moscow, Russia
- Paris, France (Partner city)
- Rome, Italy (Partner city)
- Santiago, Chile
- Tashkent, Uzbekistan
- Tripoli, Libya

== Notable inhabitants ==
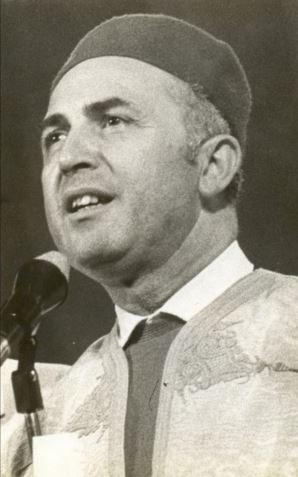
Salah El Mahdi

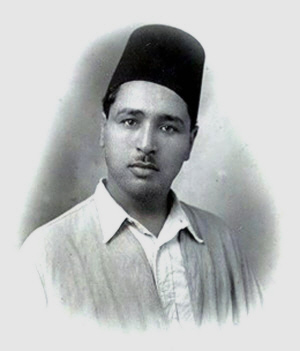
Tahar Haddad

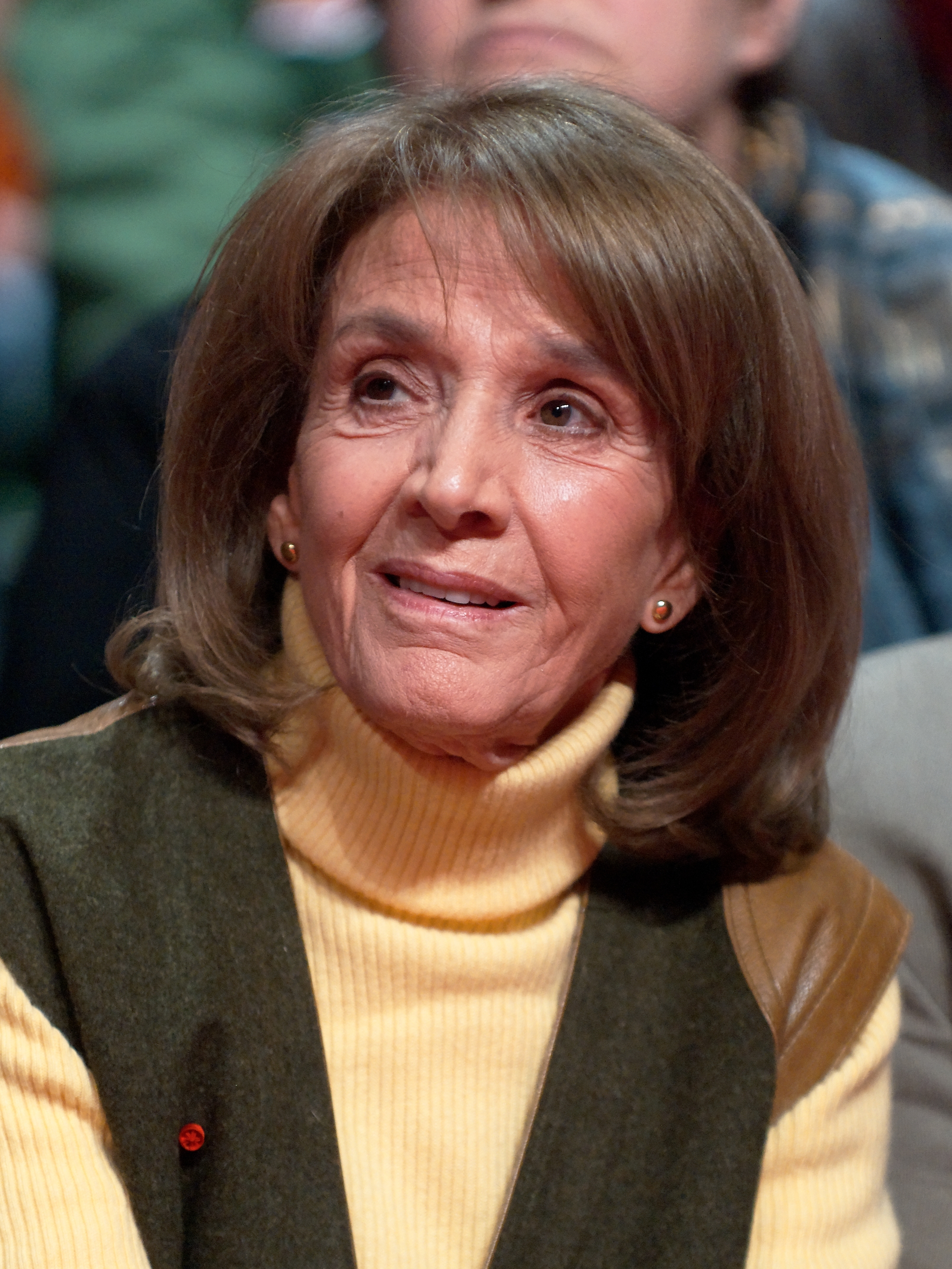
Gisèle Halimi

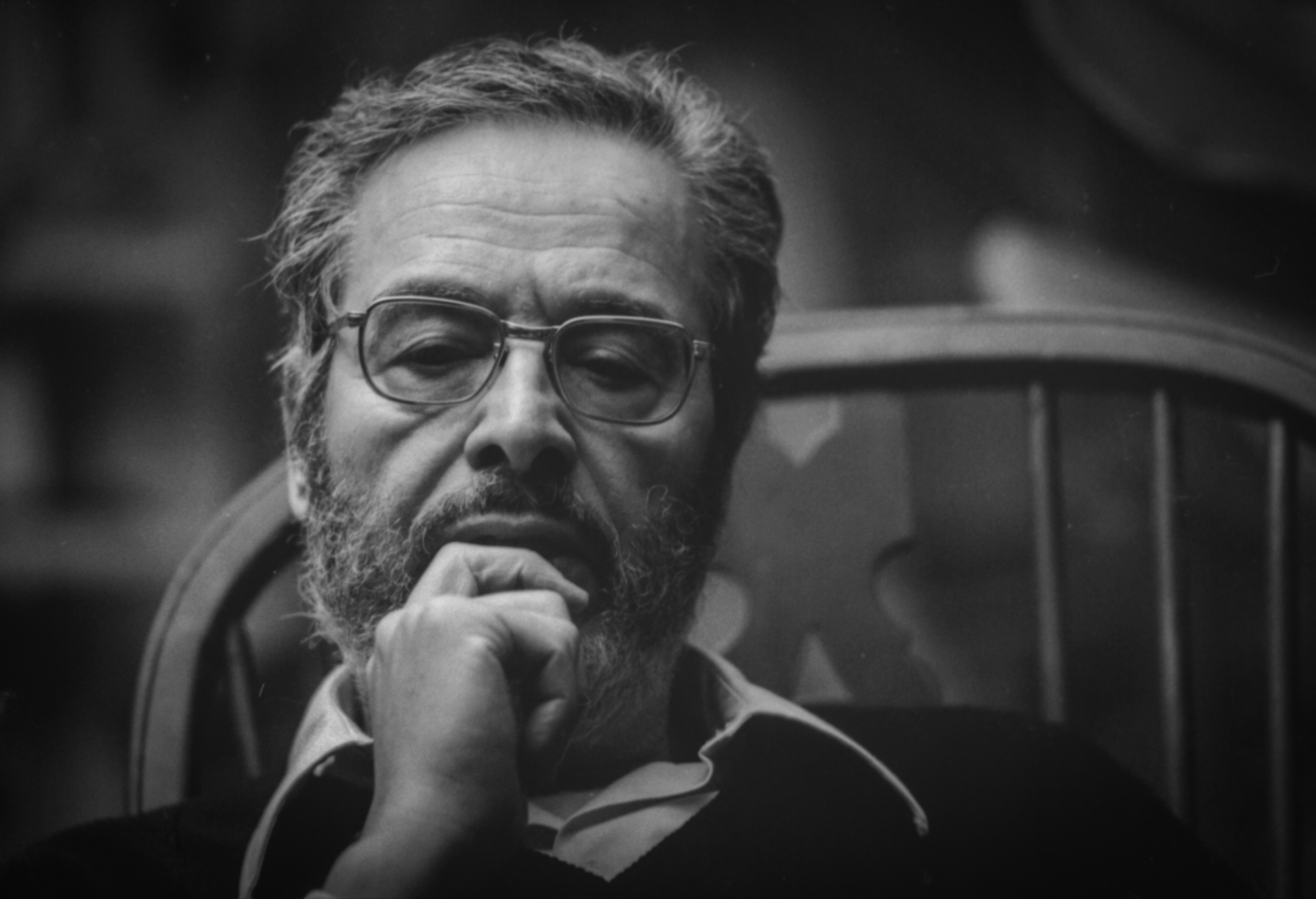
Albert Memmi

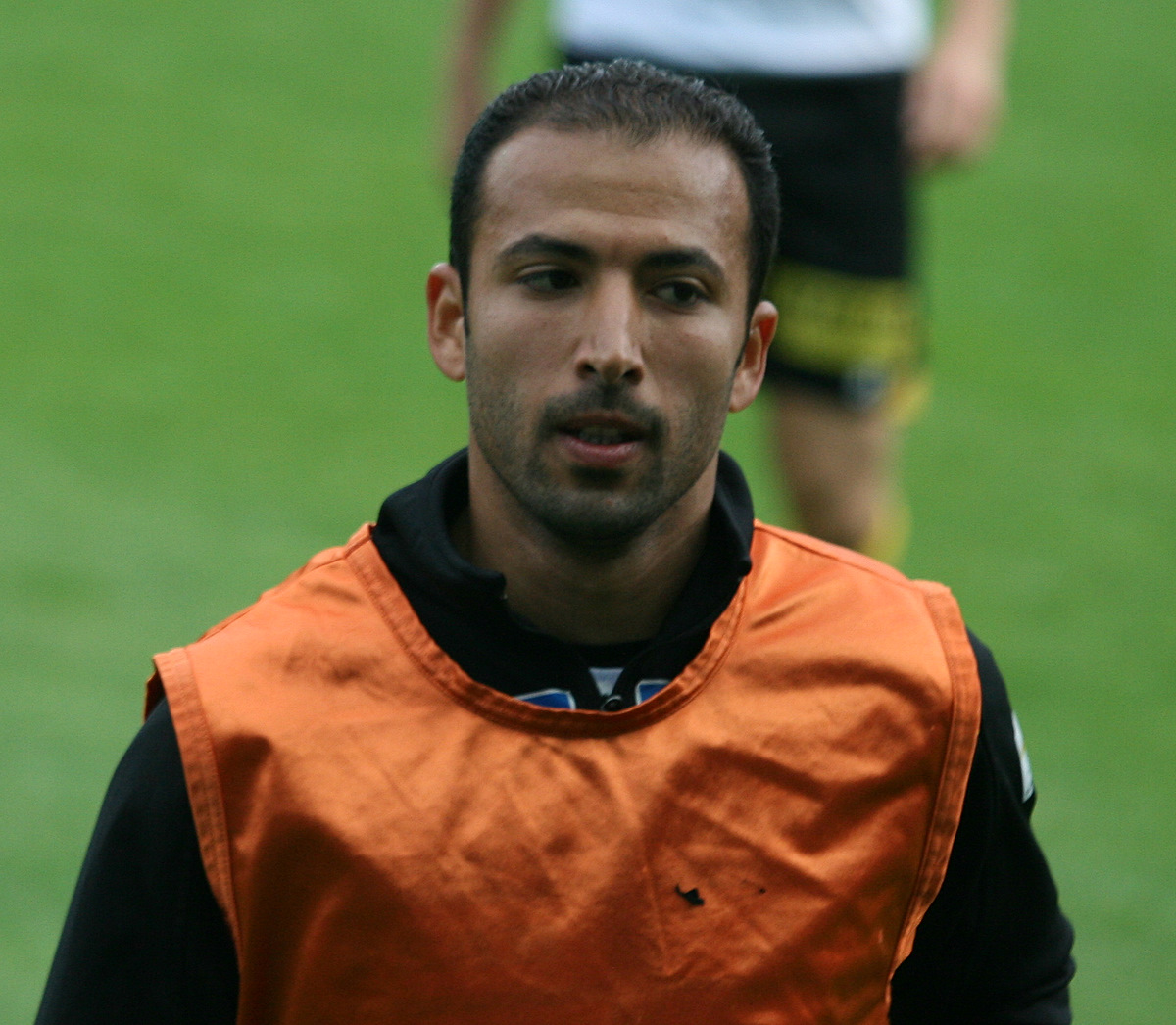
Khaled Mouelhi

- Serge Adda (1948–2004), president of the French TV channel TV5
- Tarak Ben Ammar (born 1949), Tunisian-French film producer
- Danièle Aron-Rosa (born 1934), French-Tunisian ophthalmologist and physician-scientist
- Mustapha Ben Jafar (born 1940), Tunisian politician
- Sophie Bessis, (born 1947), Franco-Tunisian historian, journalist, and researcher
- Roberto Blanco (born 1937), German pop singer and actor
- Alain Boublil (born 1941), French musical author
- Abdelhamid Bouchnak (born 1984), filmmaker
- Claudia Cardinale (1938–2025), Tunisian-Italian actress
- Hassen Chalghoumi (born 1972), imam
- Moncef Chelli (1936–1994), philosopher and writer
- Jacob Chemla (1858–1938), ceramic artist
- Karine Chemla (born 1958), historian of mathematics and sinologist
- Pierre Darmon (born 1934), French tennis player
- Bertrand Delanoë (born 1950), mayor of Paris
- Cheikh El Afrit (1897–1939), singer
- Salah El Mahdi (1925–2014), musicologist and composer
- Chokri El Ouaer (born 1966), football goalkeeper
- Farès Ferjani (born 1997), Olympic medalist saber fencer living in the U.S.
- Yehuda Getz (1924–1995), rabbi
- Marc Gicquel (born 1977), French tennis player
- Azza Ghanmi, feminist and activist
- Tahar Haddad (1899–1935), promoter of women's emancipation in Tunisia
- Gisèle Halimi (1927–2020), Tunisian-French lawyer, politician, essayist, and feminist activist
- Hédi Jouini (1909–1990), singer, oud player, and composer
- Amel Karboul (born 1973), entrepreneur, business consultant, and politician
- Abdellatif Kechiche (born 1960), Tunisian-French film director, screenwriter, and actor
- Ibn Khaldun (1332–1406), Arab sociologist and scholar
- Phillip King (1934–2021), British sculptor
- Margaret Maruani (born 1954), Tunisian-French sociologist, researcher
- Fouad Mebazaa (1933–2025), politician, President of Tunisia in 2011
- Abdelwahab Meddeb (1946–2014), Tunisian-French writer and radio staff
- Albert Memmi (1920–2020), French-Tunisian writer and sociologist
- Fatma Moalla (born 1939), mathematician
- Khaled Mouelhi (born 1981), footballer
- Alberto Pellegrino (1930–1996), Italian Olympic medalist épée and foil fencer
- Nicola Pietrangeli (1933–2025), Italian tennis player
- Karim Saidi (born 1983), footballer
- Georges-Elia Sarfati (born 1957), philosopher, linguist, poet, existentialist psychoanalyst, and author
- Joseph Sitruk (1944–2016), rabbi
- Georges Wolinski (1934–2015), French illustrator and caricaturist killed in the Charlie Hebdo shooting
- Yazid Zerhouni (1937–2020), Algerian politician

== See also ==
- European enclaves in North Africa before 1830
- Barbary pirates
- Tunisian Community Center
- Tunisian Italians
