= Société nationale des chemins de fer tunisiens =

Railway organisation of Tunisia

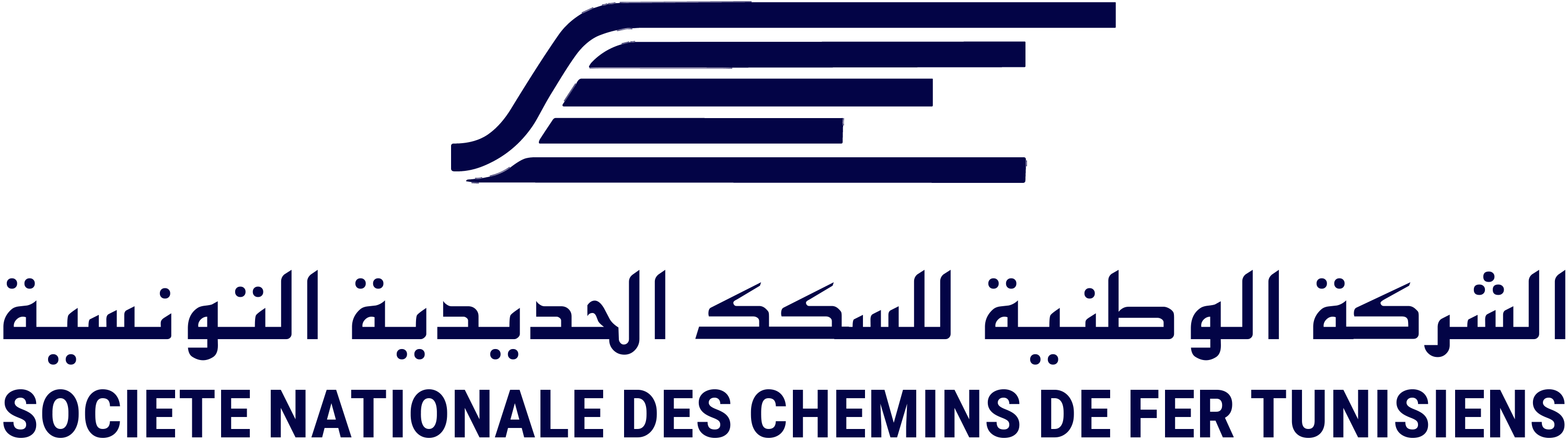
- Founded: 27 December 1957
- Headquarters: Tunisia

The Société nationale des chemins de fer tunisiens (SNCFT; Arabic: الشركة الوطنية للسكك الحديدية التونسية; lit. 'Tunisian National railway company/society') is the national railway company of Tunisia, under the direction of the Ministry of Transport. SNCFT was founded on 27 December 1956. It replaced the CFT (French: Compagnie fermière des chemins de fer tunisiens, lit. 'Tunisian farm railway company'). Headquartered in Tunis the company employs about 6000 people. SNCFT provides both passenger and freight services at a national level.

Tunisia inherited much of its rail transport system from the French and the Tunisian Government has developed the infrastructure further. Due to historical reasons, the country has two different track gauge systems. Thus SNCFT manages 471 km of 1,435 mm (4 ft 8 1/2 in) standard gauge network in the northern and a 1,674 km of 1,000 mm (3 ft 3 3/8 in) metre gauge network in the central and southern part of the country (65 km electrified); only 8 km are dual gauge track (2006).

Tunisia has a rail link with neighbouring Algeria via the border at Ghardimaou. Passenger service was restored in August 2024 with trains running three times per week, departing from Annaba on Sundays, Tuesdays, and Thursdays and from Tunis on Mondays, Wednesdays, and Fridays.

== Rolling stock ==
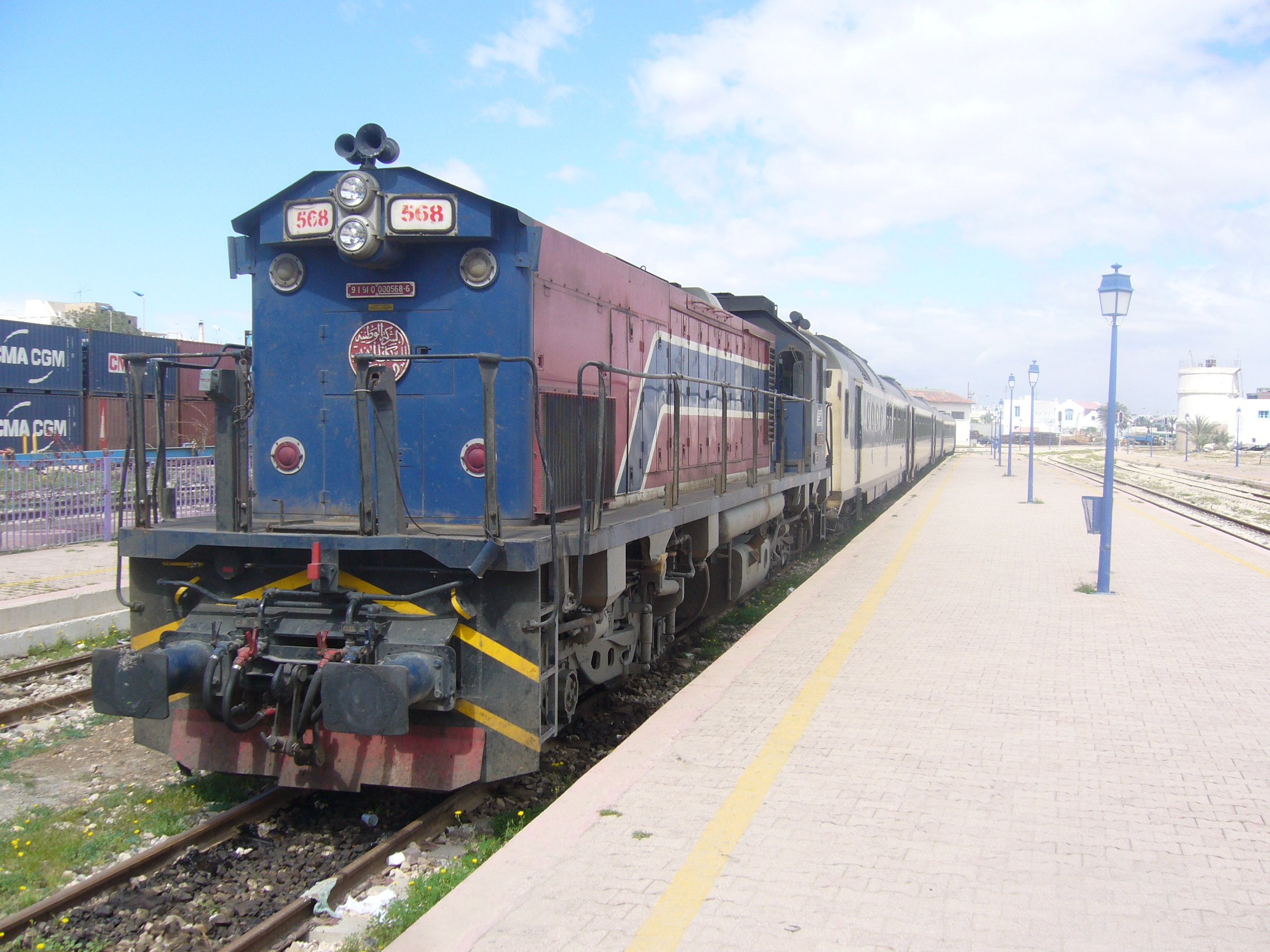
EMD GT18B Diesel Locomotive in Sfax Railway Station

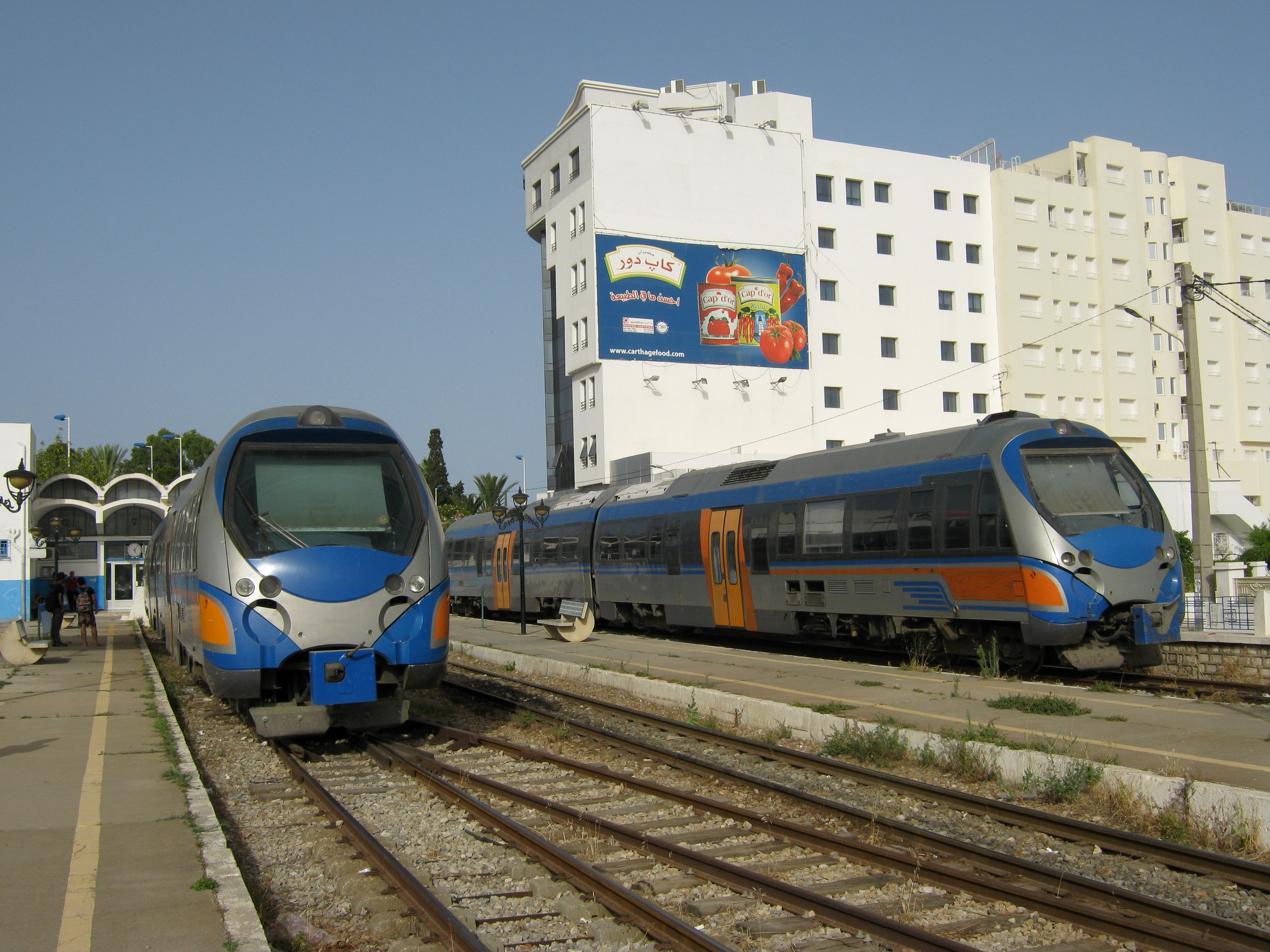
AMG800 Railcars in Nabeul Railway Station

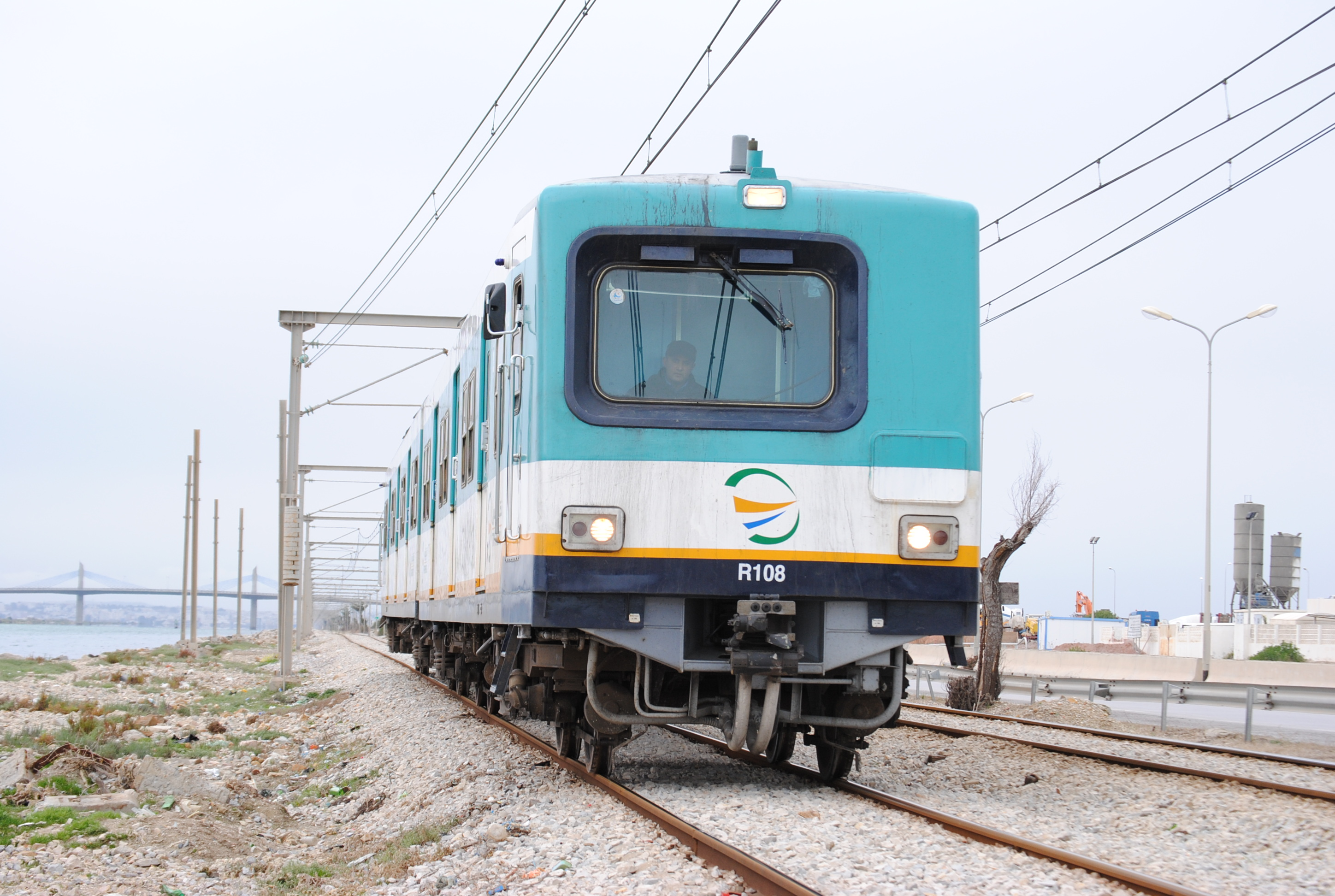
Electric train of TGM

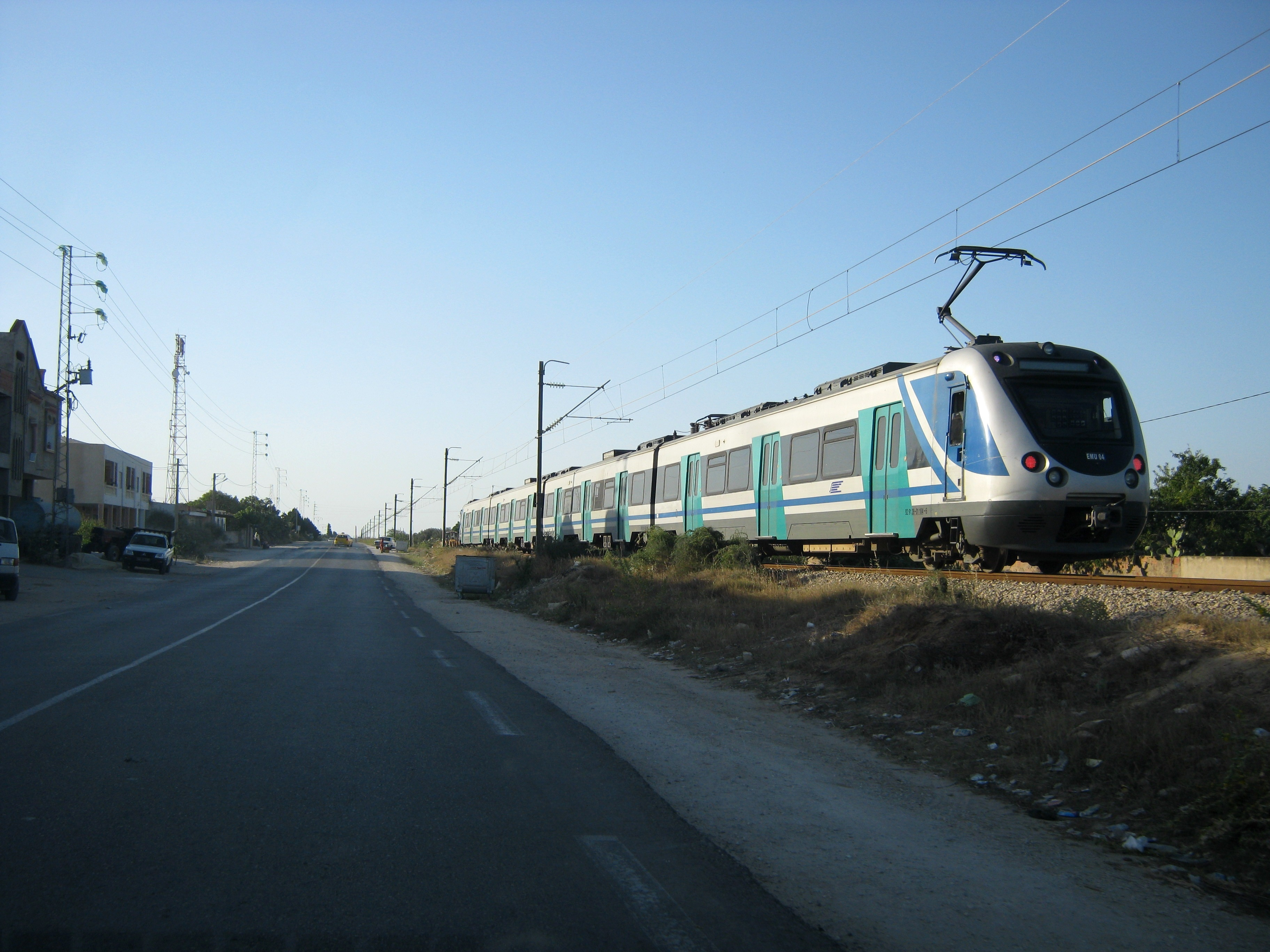
Electric train of Sahel Train Line

SNCFT owns about 180 diesel engines, 15 diesel railcars, 6 electric rail cars, over 200 passenger cars, and more than 5200 freight cars. On order are diesel engines that will attain a speed of 130 km/h; China South has supplied locomotives, two of which are used on the Tunis – Beja – Jendouba line.

== Passenger service ==
Tunisian rail network

In 2003 SNCFT served about 35.7 million passengers a year. It offers "grand confort", first class, and second class services. Fast air-conditioned trains ("Direct Climatisé") are air-conditioned in all three classes, and faster "Express" trains are also air-conditioned but have only first class and grand-confort class. Commuter trains (omnibus for local and banlieu for suburban service) usually contain only first and second class. In 2008 SNCFT took delivery of some new diesel multiple unit trains which are marketed as "Autorail Express". These are used on the routes from Tunis to Sousse and Sfax, with one round trip per day from Tunis to Dahmani.

=== Tunis area ===
Local rail-based transportation providers are managed by the Société des transports de Tunis and consist of the Metro leger, a light rail network, and the 19 km Tunis-Goulette–La Marsa 1,435 mm (4 ft 8 1/2 in) standard gauge light rail link (TGM).

SNCFT provides 3 local services in the Southern and Western suburbs of Tunis:

- Line A : Tunis - Radès - Hammam Lif - Borj Cédria - Erriadh; electrification is now completed.
- Line E : Tunis Ville - Bougatfa
- Line D : Tunis Ville - Mannouba - Gobaa

=== Overland routes ===
Tunis is the hub of the SNCFT network. The major routes are as follows:

==== Standard gauge ====
- Ligne TA: Tunis - Beja - Ghardimaou, border to Souk Ahras, Algeria
- Ligne 1: Jedaida - Mateur - Bizerte
- Ligne 2: Mateur - Tamra - Tabarka
- Ligne 3: Tinja - Menzel Bourguiba
- Ligne 4: Mateur - Beja
- Ligne 19: Sidi Smail - Nebeur Ligne Abandonné

==== Metre gauge ====
- Ligne 5: Tunis - Kalaa Sghira - Sfax - Gabes - this route is electrified from Tunis Ville To Borj Cedria
- Ligne 6: Djbel Jelloud - Kalaa Khasba - Kasserine
- Ligne 7: Bir Kasaa - La Goulette
- Ligne 8: Les Salines- Le Kef
- Ligne 9: Fej Tameur - Tajerouine
- Ligne 10: Bir Bou Regba - Nabeul Voyageurs
- Ligne 11: Kalaa Sghira - Kasserine
- Ligne 12: Kalaa Sghira - Sousse
- Ligne 13: Sfax - Metlaoui - Tozeur
- Ligne 14
- Ligne 15: Metlaoui - Moulares - Kasserine
- Ligne 16: Tabbedit - Redeyef
- Ligne 17
- Ligne 18: M'SAKEN - Moknine
- Ligne 20: Djbel Jelloud - La Goulette
- Ligne 21: Gafsa - Aouinet
- Ligne 22: Sousse Bab Jedid - Monastir - Mahdia - this route is electrified

The Lézard rouge (Red Lizard) is a diesel hauled tourist train on metre gauge and goes from Metlaoui to Seldja. The service uses a former royal train of the Bey of Tunis with attendants in period uniform and makes photo stops in the Seldja Gorge. The train had been suspended for several years, but in May 2025 it was reported to have resumed service.

== Freight service ==
SNCFT transported about 11.6 million tons of freight in 2003. In the south of Tunisia the Sfax-Gafsa Railway delivers phosphate and iron ore to the harbour at Sfax. Also the Metlaoui - Redeyef and Moularès - Kasserine lines are for the transport of phosphate.

== History ==
In 1870, the Italian company Mancardi was granted a concession for a railway between Tunis and the Sahel region but due to lack of capital was unable to build it. Instead, the first railway line in Tunisia linked Tunis with La Marsa - today's TGM line - and was inaugurated on 2 August 1872 by Sadok Bey.

=== Construction of the northern network ===
In 1872 the British Pickering company was allowed to build a standard gauge railway between Tunis and Jendouba with a concession for 50 years. However, as the plan was not implemented, in 1876, the French Corporation des Batignolles and its subsidiary, the Compagnie des chemins de fer Bône-Guelma, took over. Work started on 30 April 1877. The opening of the first link from Tunis to Tebourba took place on 24 June 1878. The line reached Medjez El Bab on 30 September, Oued Zarga on 30 December, Béja on 1 September 1879, Jendouba on 30 September and Ghardimaou on 30 March 1880. The link with Algeria was completed by 29 September 1884. In 1894, the route was linked to Bizerte. Later links were extended to Béja Mateur (1912) and Tabarka (1922). The French company was granted operational rights until 1922, after which it would be sold to the Tunisian state.

=== Construction of the southern network ===
In 1885 considerable deposits of phosphates were discovered in the region of Seldja. In 1897 a concession was granted to the Compagnie des phosphates et des chemins de fer de Sfax-Gafsa (CPCFSG) to mine the mineral and to build rail transport to the port of Sfax. The metre-gauge railway between Sfax and Métlaoui via Gafsa was completed by 1899. It was extended in 1913 to Tozeur and 1916 to Gabès. At the end of the concession, the line was to be returned to the Tunisian State.

In addition, the company was granted a concession to construct a railway between Tunis and Sousse that was built between 1895 and 1899 with branches to the Pont du Fahs, the Cape Bon, Nabeul, Kairouan and Moknine. This portion of the metre-gauge network was complemented by linking up to Fahs Ksar Ghilane (1906) where large holdings of phosphates and iron were found. The link between Sousse and Sfax was closed by 1911. The link to Cap Bon was extended in 1940 to the lignite deposits of El Oudiane. Finally, the connection between Ksar Rhilane in Algeria and the network was completed in 1930 and the strategic link between Haïdra and Kasserine was closed by 1940.

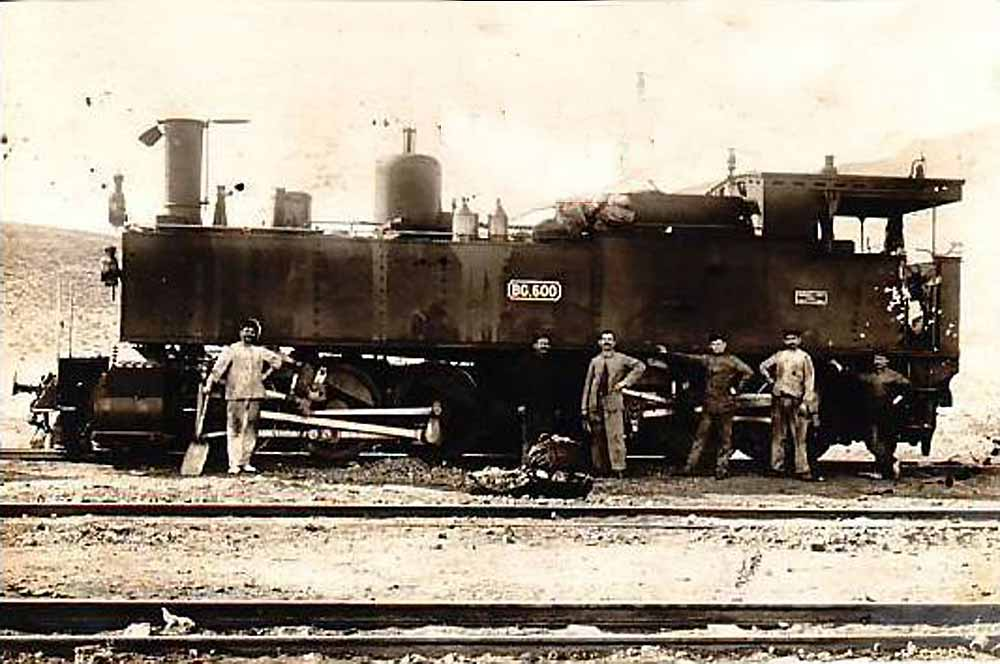
Mallet locomotive of the former Bône-Guelma railway

=== Post World War II ===
By 1952 the rail network comprised 2044 km including 456 km of standard gauge and 1110 km of metre gauge operated by the Compagnie fermière des chemins de fer tunisiens. Their funding was provided by the state budget with the exception of the line Tunis - Ghardimaou which was acquired in 1922 by the Compagnie des chemins de fer Bône-Guelma. In addition there was the 440 km of metre gauge track operated by the Compagnie des phosphates et des chemins de fer de Sfax-Gafsa and 33 km standard track of the TGM.

After independence in 1956, the Tunisian rail system was reorganised under the newly formed SNCFT, with the exception of TGM. The concession of the CPCFSG expired at the end of 1966 and its rail operation became part of Tunisian Railways on 1 January 1967.

=== Modern developments ===
Not shown on the map is the 120 km direct line between Gafsa and Gabès.

In 2004, a new section of line opened from Kalaa Seghira to M'Saaken, enabling through Tunis - Sfax services to avoid Sousse town centre. Until that year, all services passing through Sousse had to pass through the streets and along the seafront at low speed. Most of the Tunis - Sfax route was double-tracked at this time, enabling faster and more-punctual services to operate.

Discussions are underway between Libya and Tunisia about a 150 km standard gauge link from Ras Ajdir on the Libyan border to Gabès. Libya is building a coastal network planned to extend eventually to Egypt that currently terminates at Ras Ajdir. Containers could be transferred to the metre gauge at Gabès at an exchange yard. Standard gauge access to the current Gabès terminus station could be had at the coastal curve 2 km east of the terminus.

=== Timeline ===
- 2008 - Agreement with Libya for link line;
- 2012 - Electrification of the Tunis - Borj Cedria railway line and the launch of several Hyundai Rotem modern electrical trains.

==== Proposed lines ====
- Gabès
- Medenine
- Ras Ajdir border station with Libya and the Libyan Coast Line (construction launched in 2008, suspended since the Arab Spring)

== See also ==
- Rail transport in Tunisia
- Société des transports de Tunis
- Transport in Tunisia
- Reseau Ferroviaire Rapide
