= Lycée Gustave Flaubert =

Lycée Gustave Flaubert may refer to:

Schools in France:

- Lycée Gustave Flaubert (Rouen)

Schools outside of France:

- Lycée Gustave Flaubert (Rabat) - Morocco
- Lycée Gustave Flaubert (La Marsa) - Tunisia
