= Tunis Marine =

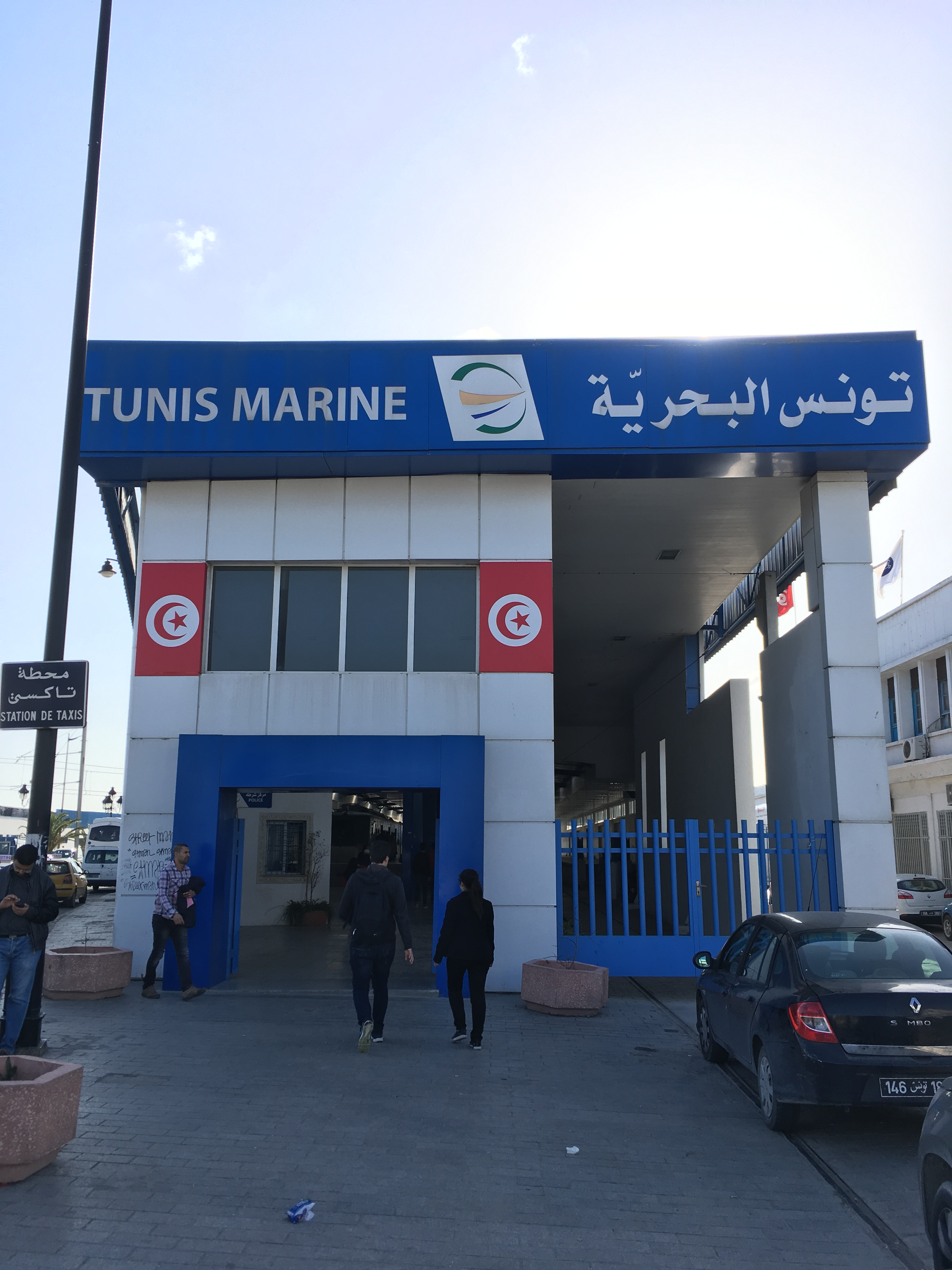
- The station in 2017

General information
- Location: Tunis; Tunisia
- Coordinates: 36.800669°N 10.191994°E
- System: Passenger terminus
- Operator: Société des transports de Tunis
Route map
Location

Tunis Marine is a railway station in Tunis, the capital of Tunisia, and forms the southern terminus of the standard gauge Tunis-Goulette-Marsa railway or "TGM", which was inaugurated in 1872. The line and the station are managed by the Société des transports de Tunis (Transtu). The service depot for the line's trains is adjacent, to the north, reached by a level crossing over Avenue Habib Bourguiba (formerly called Avenue de la Marine).

Tunis Metro (light rail) routes 1 and 4, also managed by Transtu, terminate nearby and provide services to the city centre, the main railway station, Tunis Gare Centrale, and beyond. Buses from the station serve destinations including Tunis–Carthage International Airport and the Bardo National Museum.

The next station on the TGM line is Le Bac.

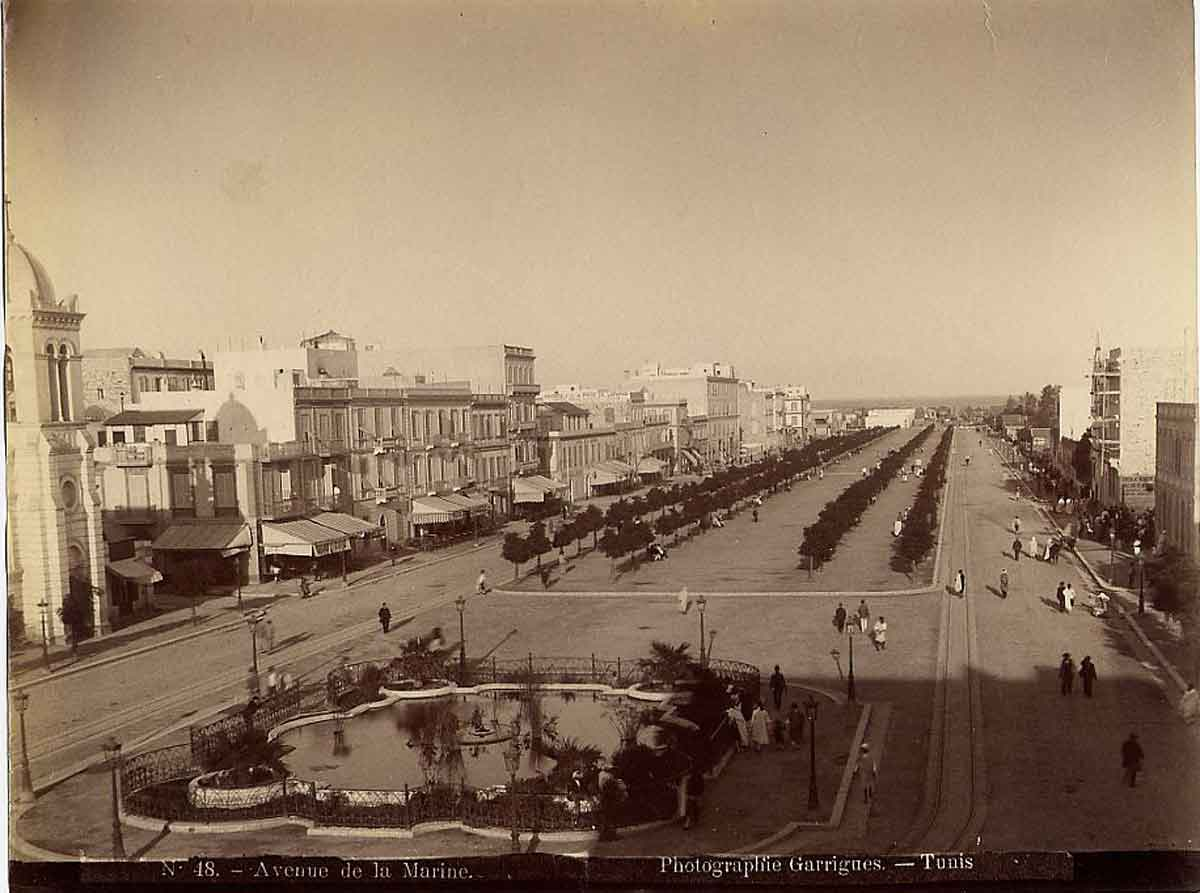
Tunis Marine (1885)

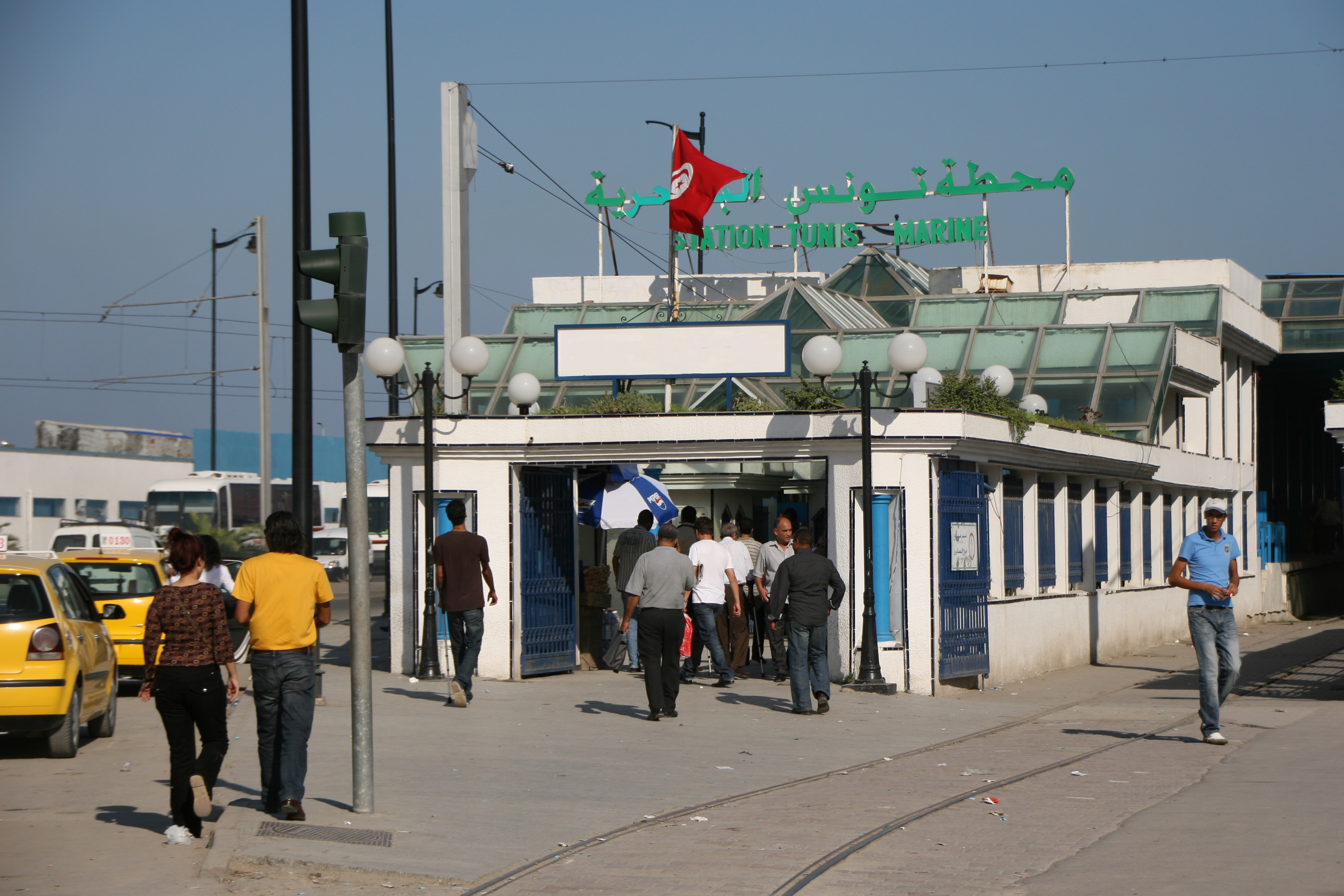
View of the station (2009)

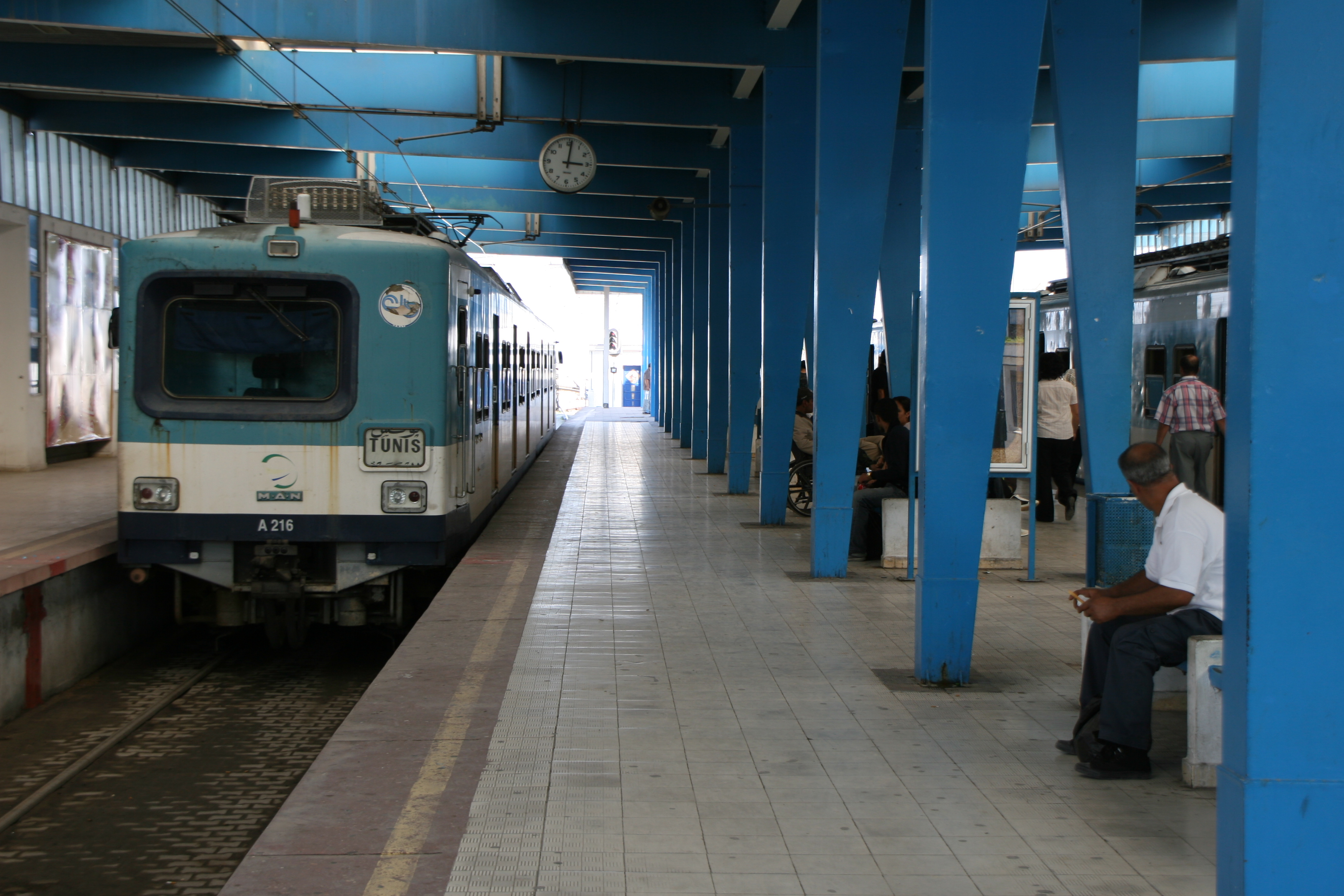
TGM train in station (2009)

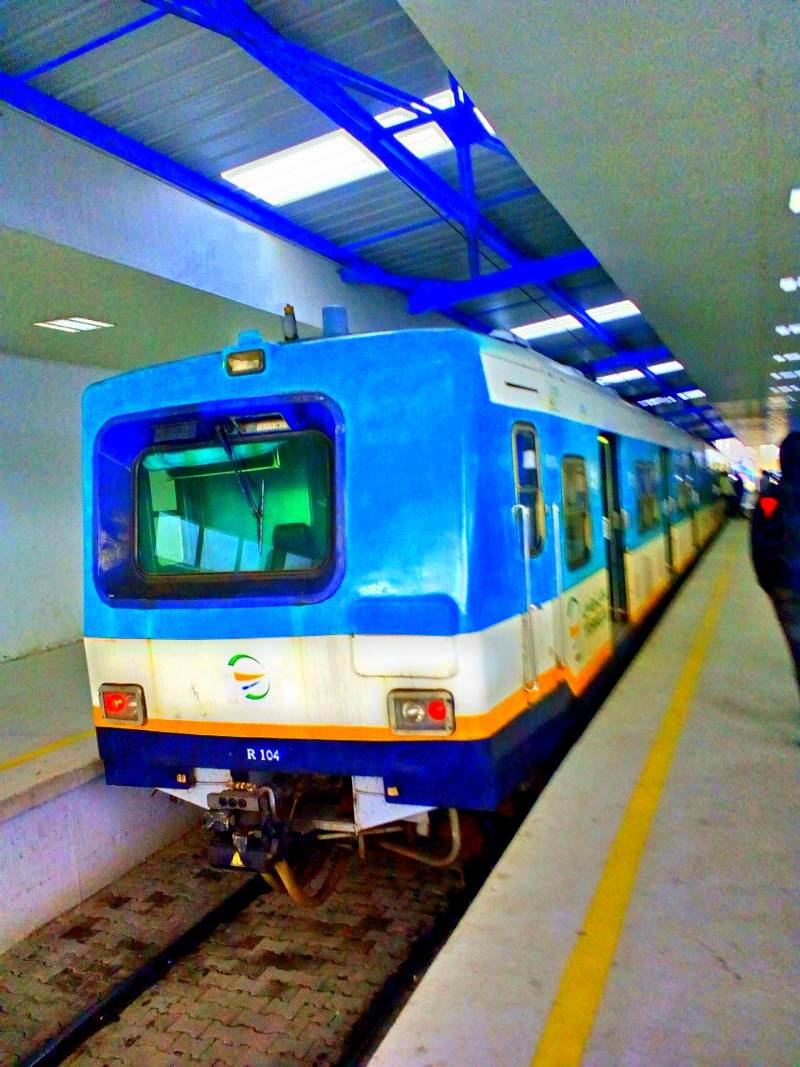
TGM train in station (2017)
