= Tunis-Goulette-Marsa =

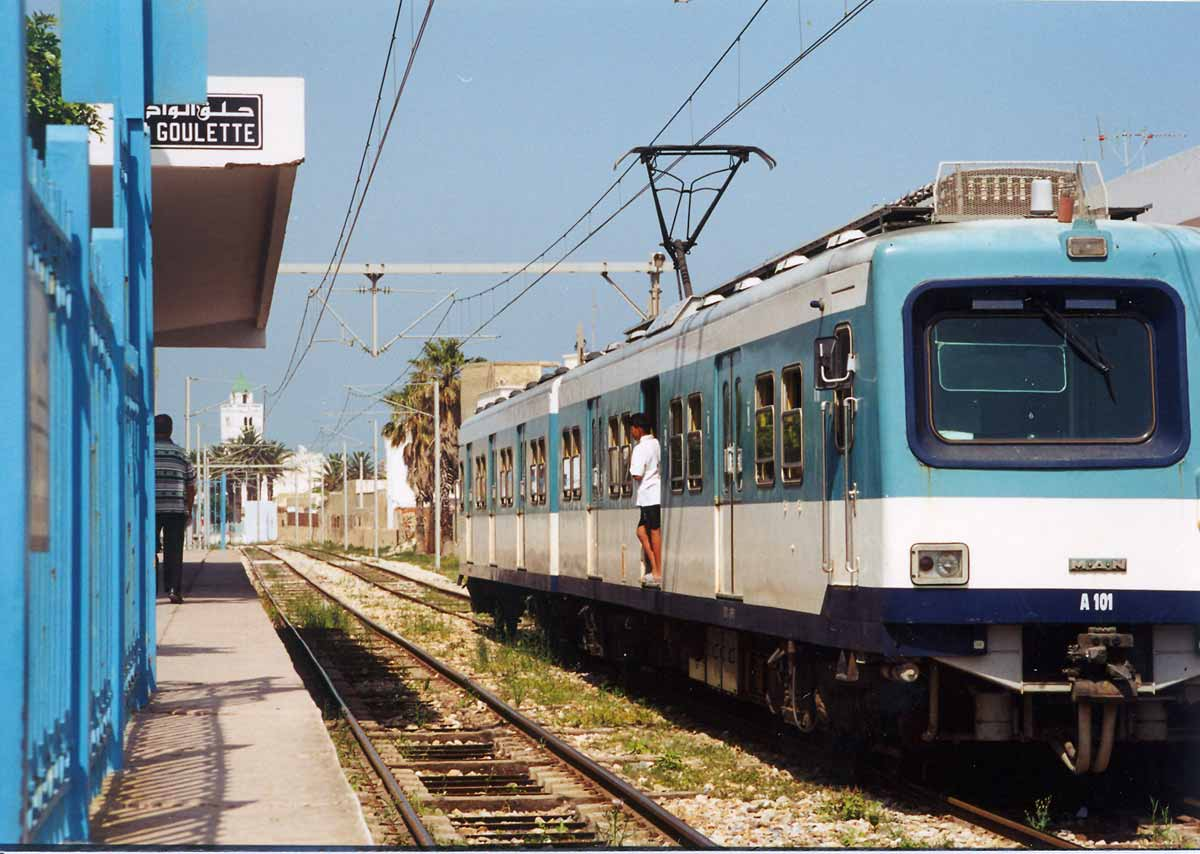
- At La Goulette station

Overview
- Status: Operational
- Locale: Tunis, La Goulette, Le Kram, Carthage, Sidi Bou Saïd, and La Marsa, Tunisia
- Termini: Tunis Marine (south); Marsa Plage (north)
- Stations: 18

Service
- Type: Commuter rail
- Operator(s): Société des transports de Tunis

History
- Opened: 1872

Technical
- Line length: 19 kilometres (11.8 mi)
- Number of tracks: 2
- Character: Surface
- Track gauge: 4 ft 8 1/2 in (1,435 mm)
- Electrification: 750 V DC Catenary

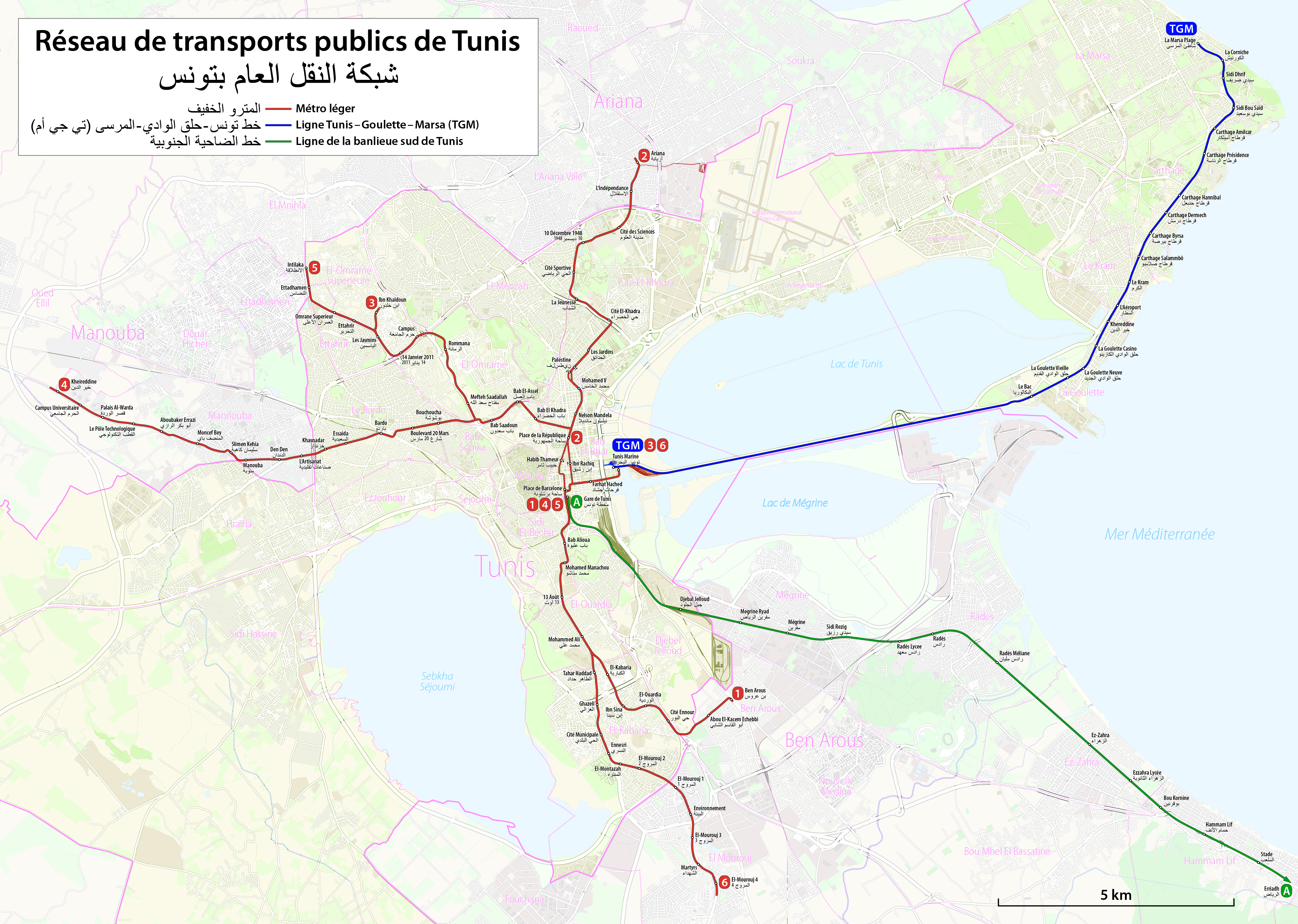
Map of the TGM is (in blue)

The Tunis-Goulette-Marsa or TGM is a 19 km (12 mi) 1,435 mm (4 ft 8 1/2 in) (standard gauge) commuter rail line in Tunisia. It links the capital city, Tunis, with the town of La Marsa via La Goulette. The commuter rail has 18 stations.

== Overview ==
The TGM was the first railway in Tunisia. It was inaugurated in 1872, a decade before France imposed the protection treaty, and has been known as the TGM since 1905. It is part of the transportation system of the Tunis area, and is managed by the Société des transports de Tunis (Transtu), which also manages the light rail of Tunis (Le métro léger de Tunis). Transtu was founded in 2003 by joining the Société du métro léger de Tunis (SMLT, founded 1981) and the Société nationale de transports (SNT, founded 1963).

== Stations ==
- Tunis Marine
- Le Bac
- La Goulette
- La Goulette Neuve
- La Goulette Casino
- Khereddine
- L'Aéroport
- Le Kram
- Carthage Salammbô
- Carthage Byrsa
- Carthage Dermech
- Carthage Hannibal
- Carthage Présidence
- Carthage Amilcar
- Sidi Bou Saïd
- Sidi Dhrif
- La Corniche
- Marsa Plage
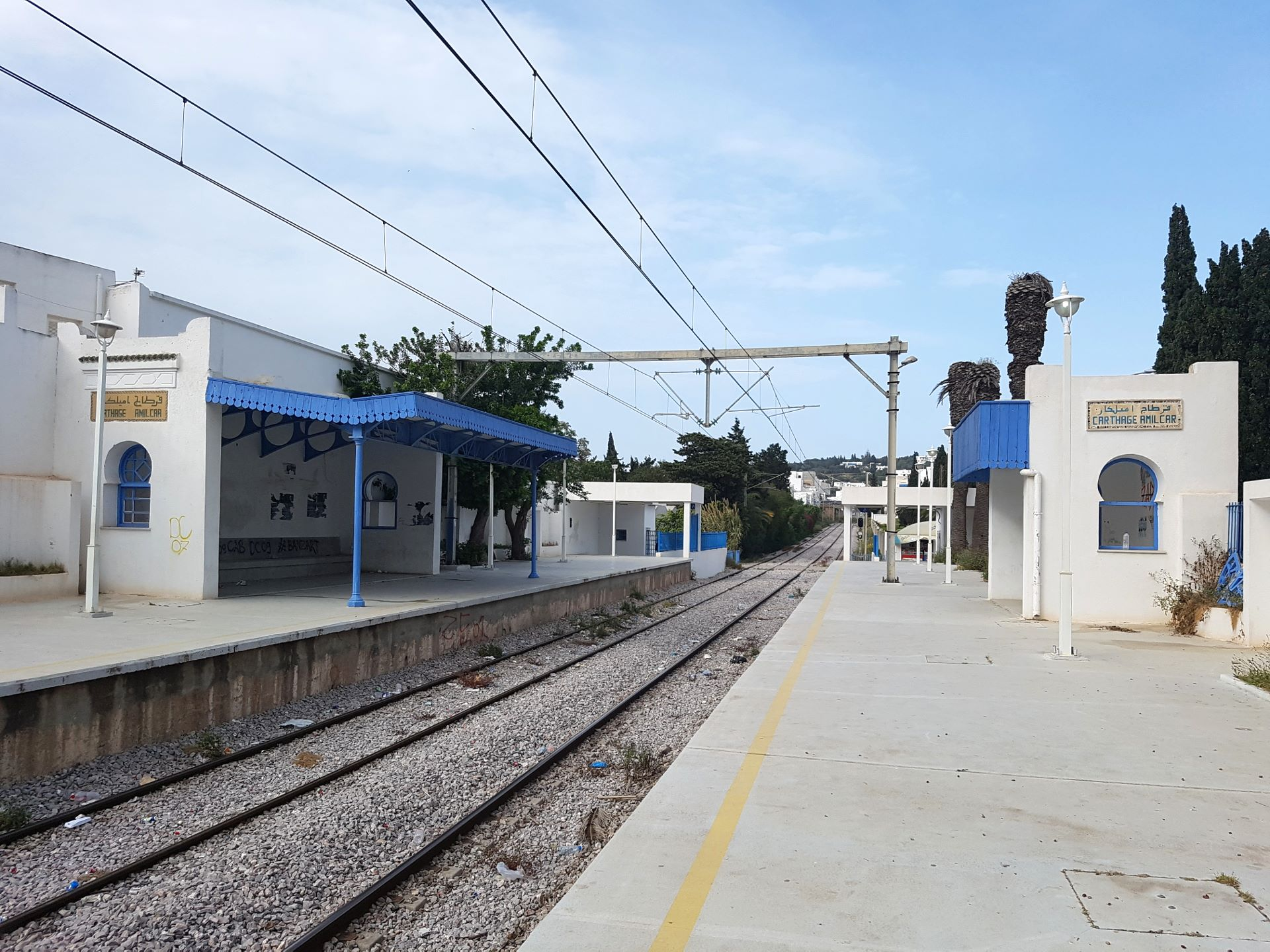

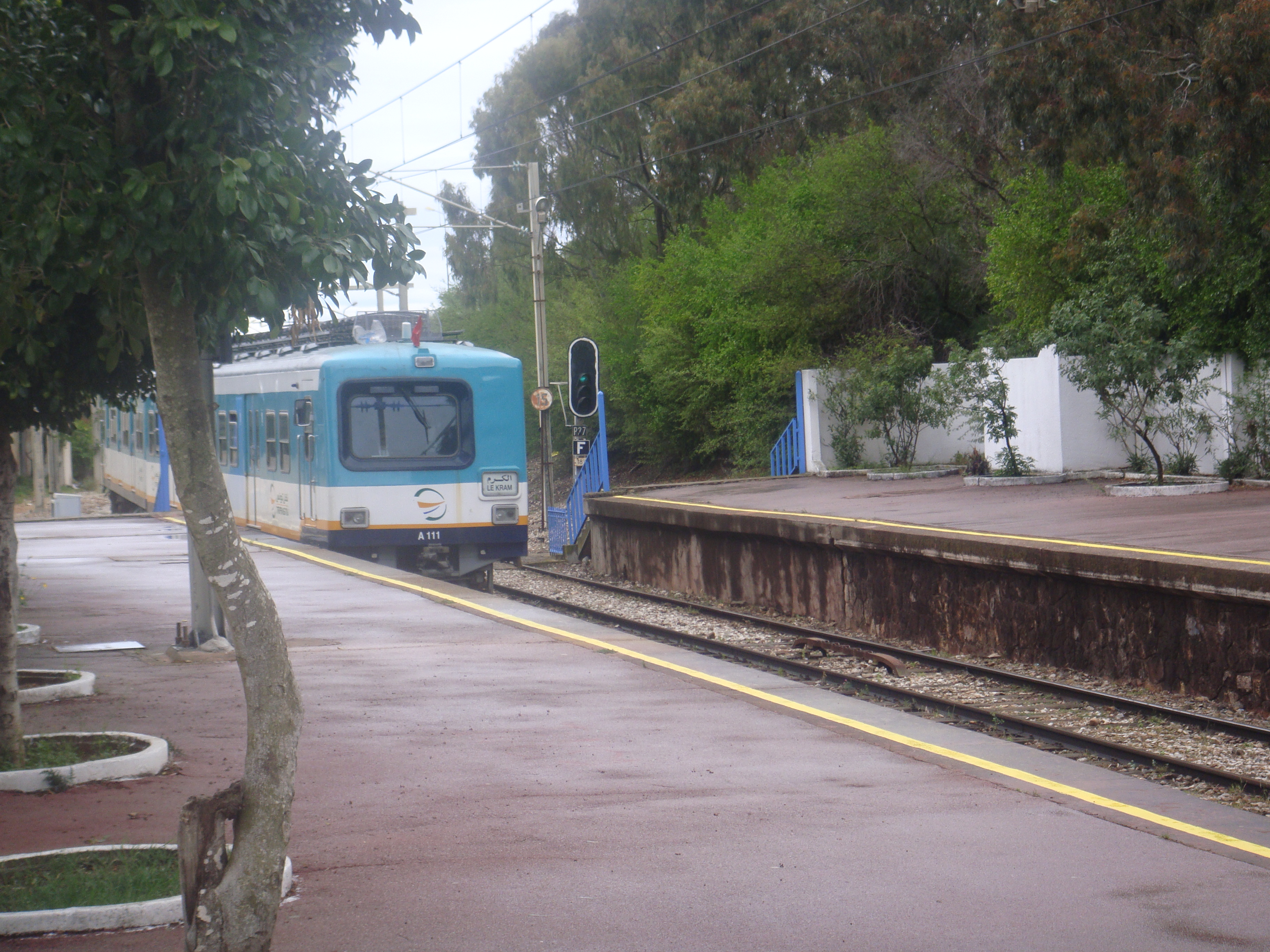

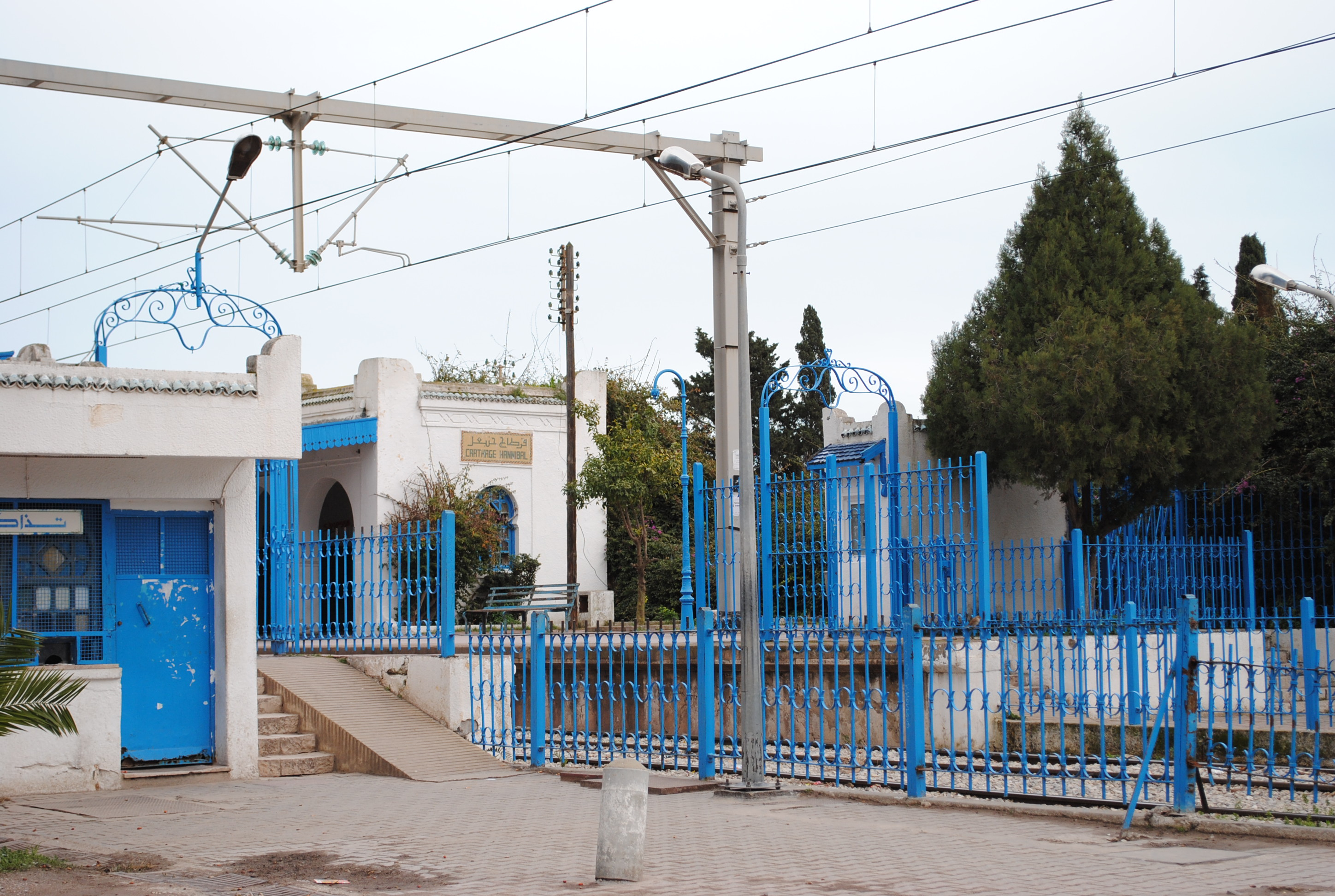

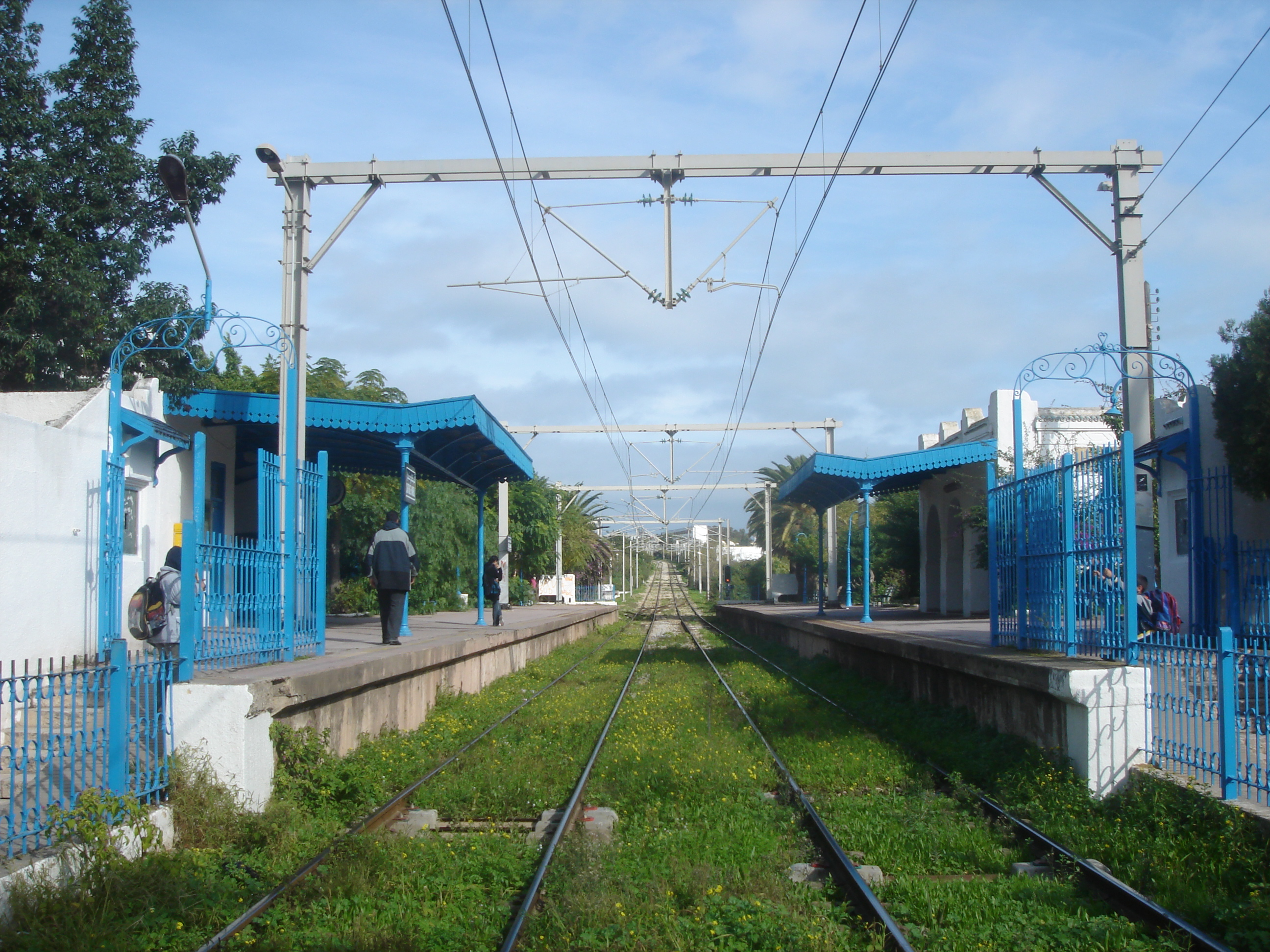

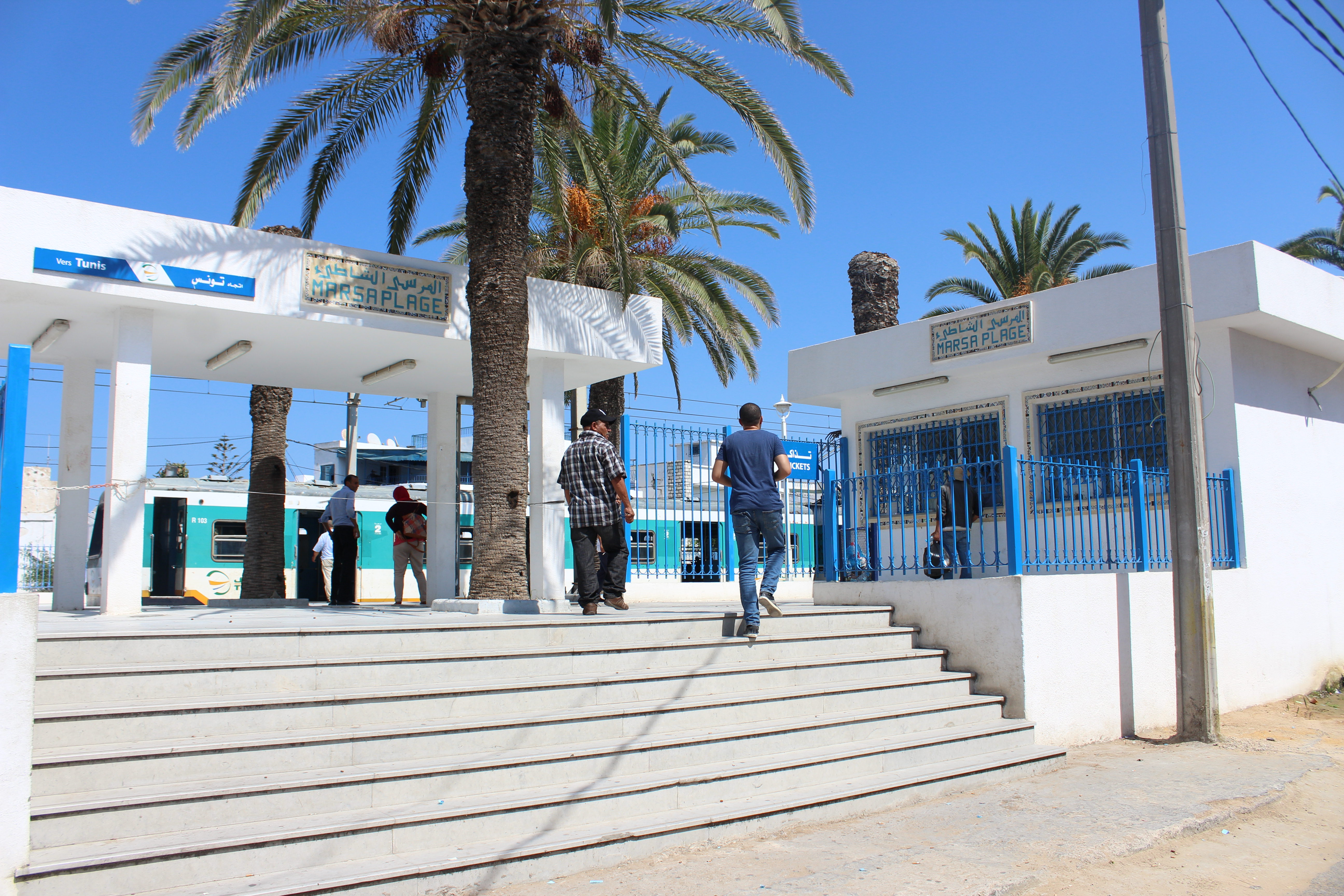

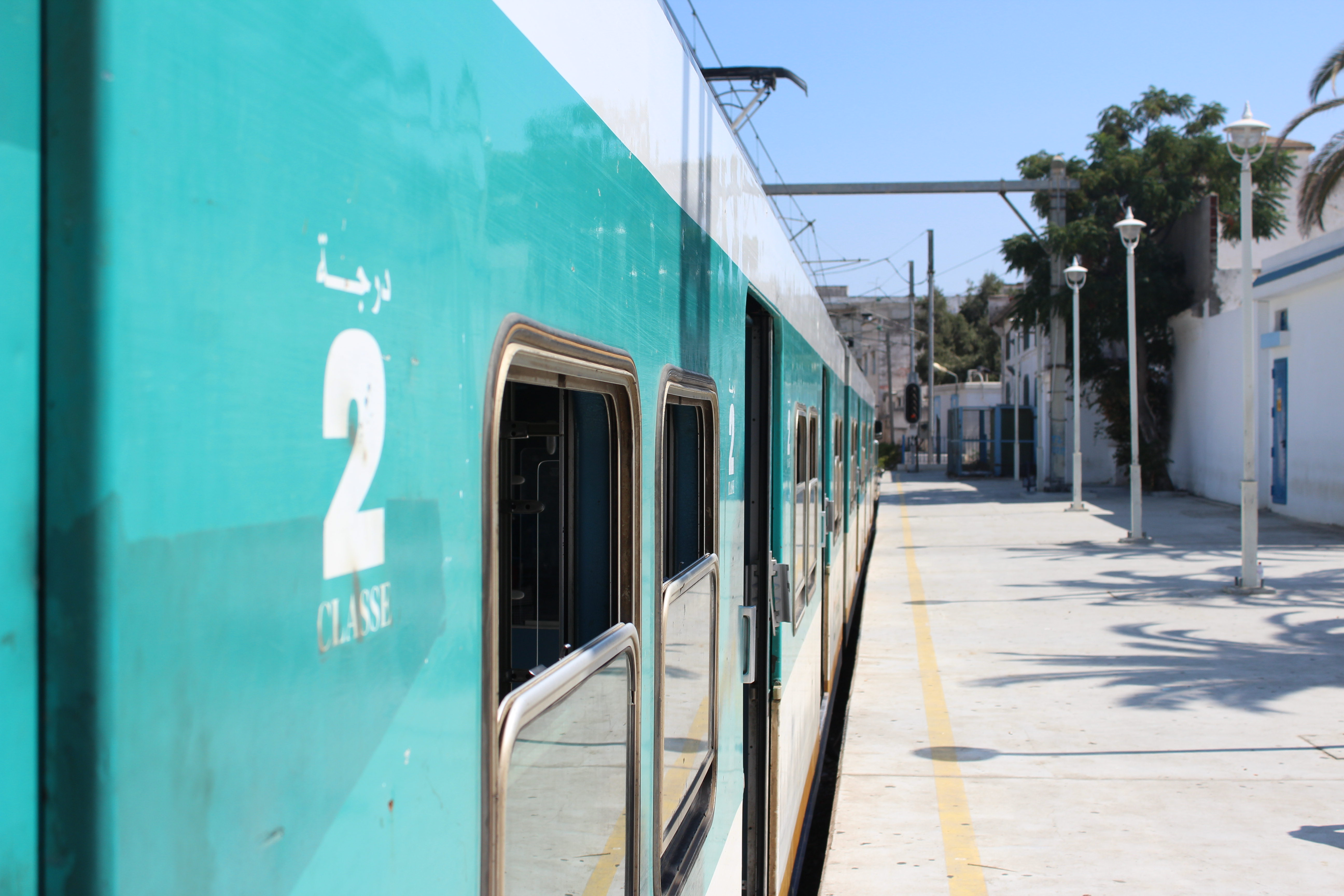

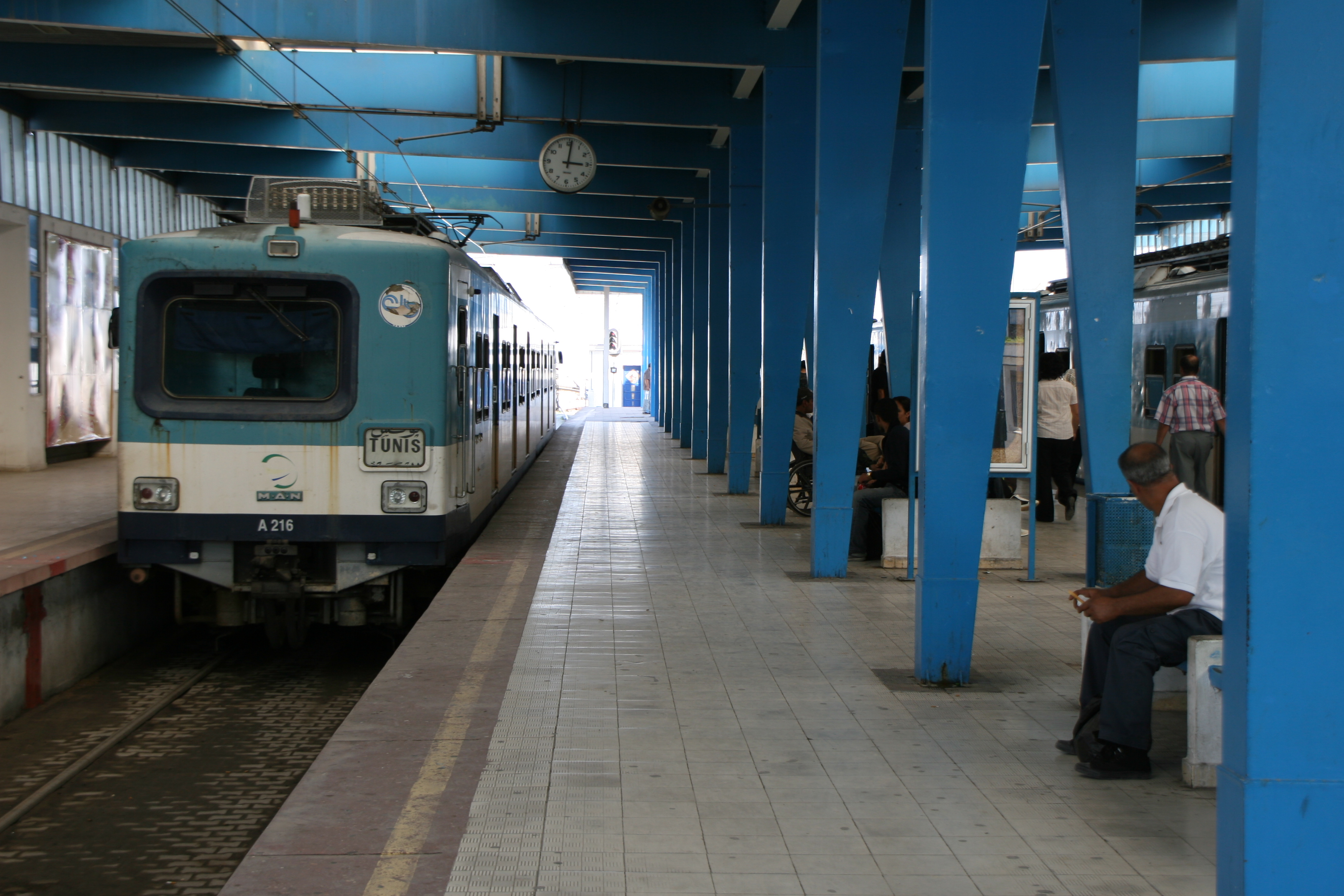

== See also ==
- SNCFT
- Société des transports de Tunis
