= Tunis Light Metro =

Light rail network serving Tunis, Tunisia

Tunis Light Metro المترو الخفيف لمدينة تونس
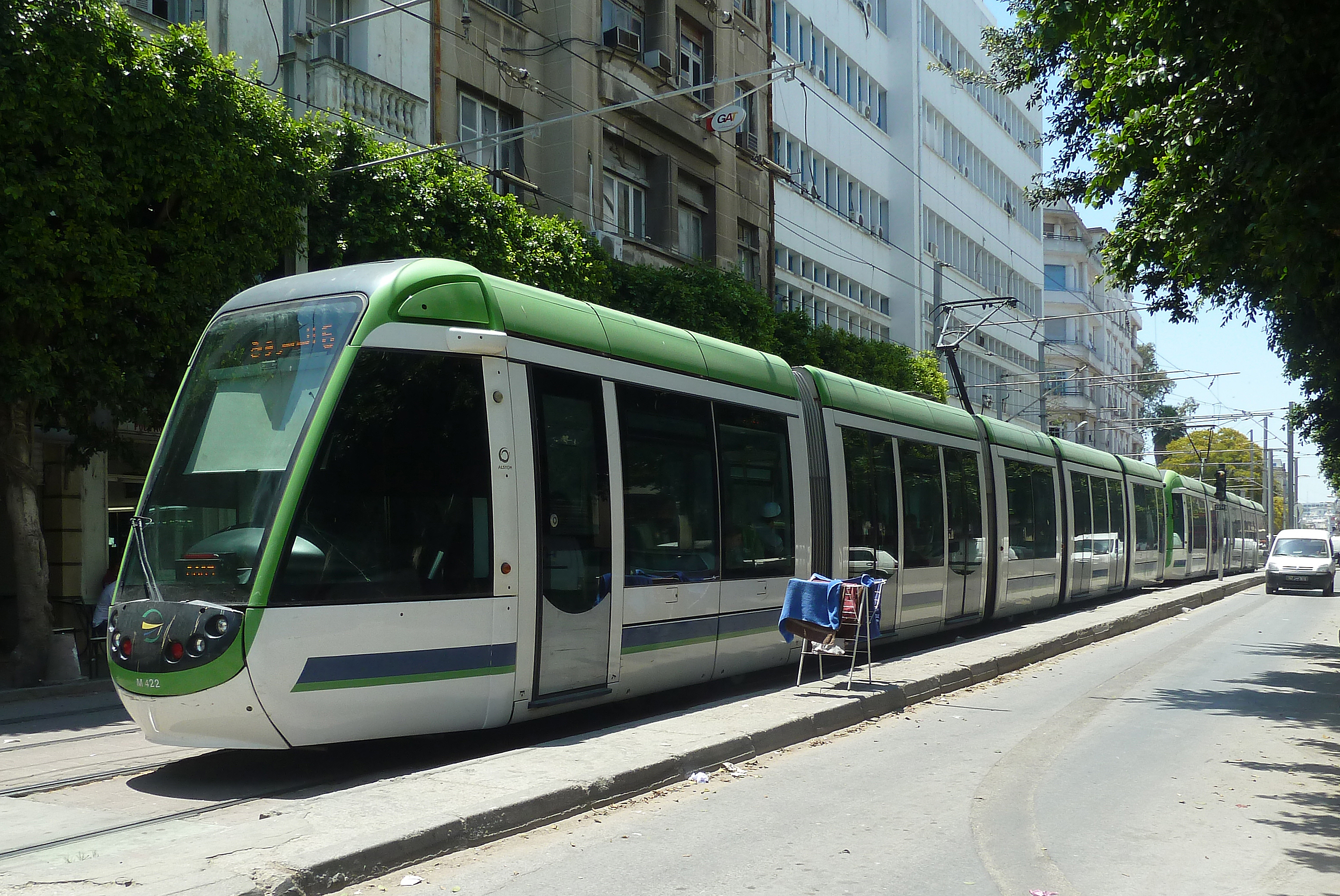
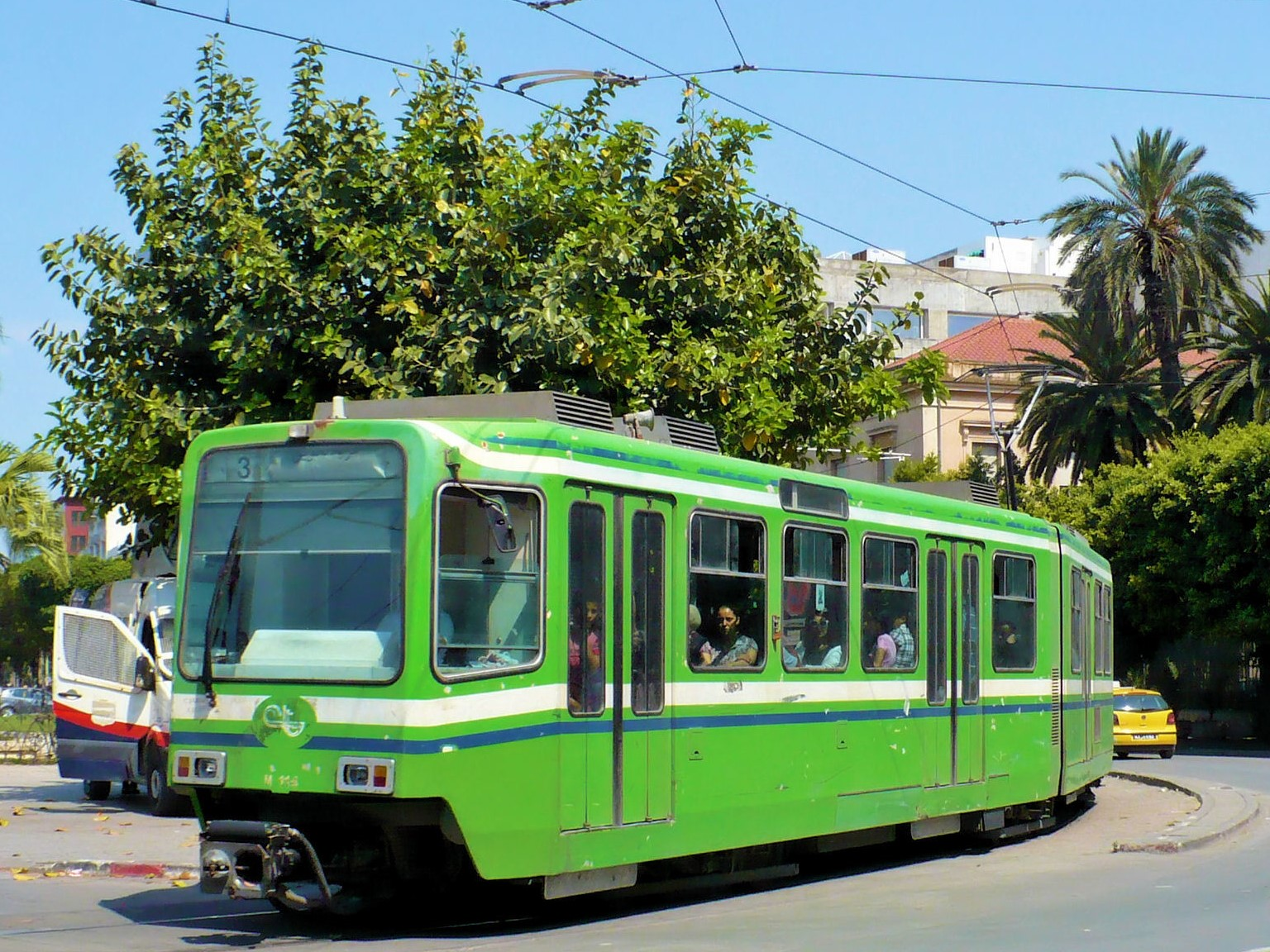
- Top: An Alstom Citadis 302 on a Line 6 service to El Mourouj; Bottom: A Siemens-Duewag TW 6000 on a Line 3 service in the city centre of Tunis

Overview
- Owner: Société des transports de Tunis (Transtu)
- Locale: Tunis, Tunisia
- Transit type: Light rail
- Number of lines: 6
- Number of stations: 65
- Website: https://www.transtu.tn/fr/

Operation
- Began operation: 13 October 1985
- Operator: Société des transports de Tunis (Transtu)
- Number of vehicles: 190 (135 Siemens-Duewag TW 6000 and 55 Alstom Citadis 302)

Technical
- System length: 45.2 km (28.1 mi)
- Track gauge: 1,435 mm (4 ft 8 1/2 in) standard gauge
- Electrification: 750 V DC overhead line
System map
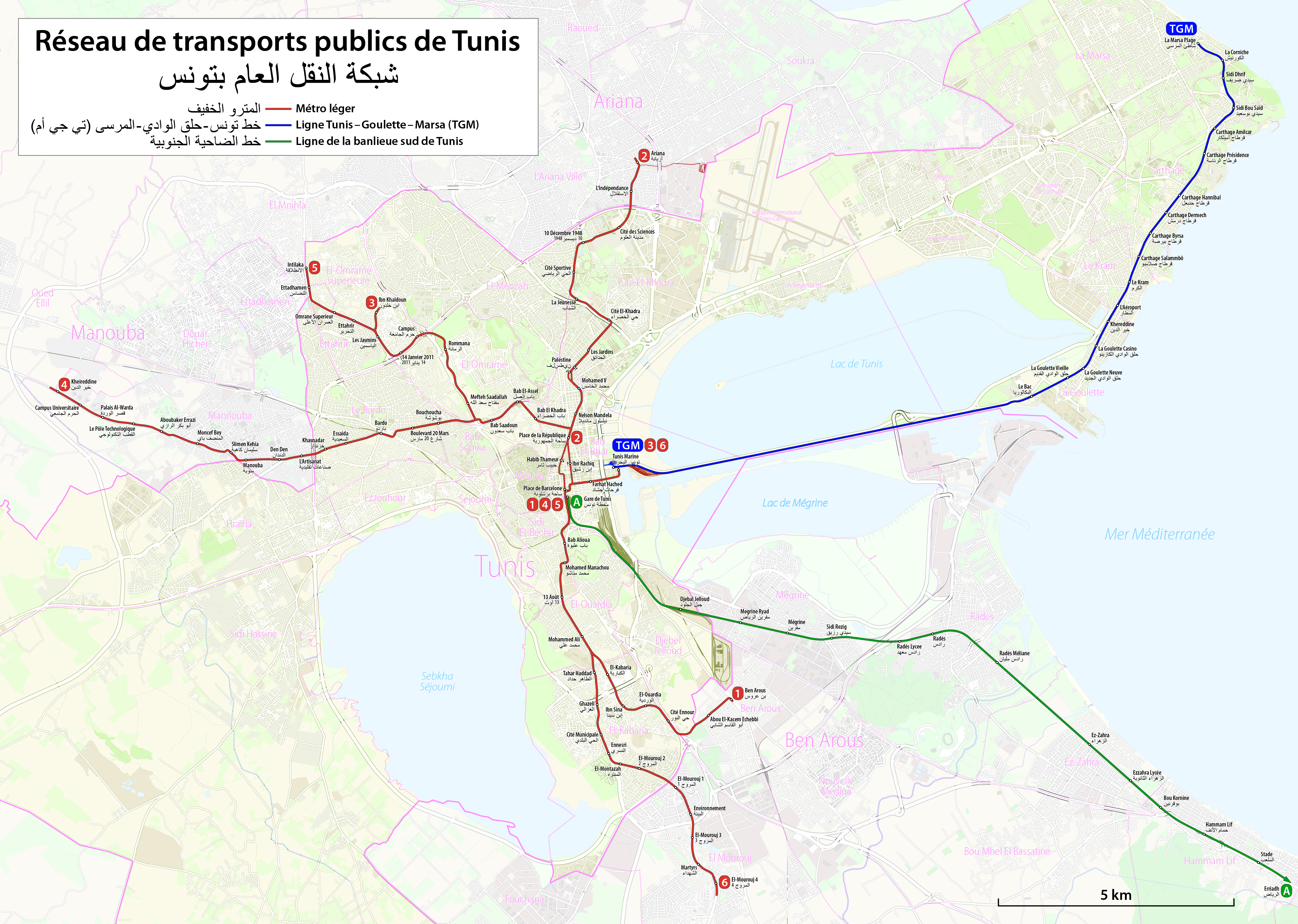

The Tunis Light Metro (French: Métro léger de Tunis, meaning Tunis light rail, Tunisian Arabic: المترو الخفيف لمدينة تونس, el-metrū el-khfīf li-mdīnat tūnis) is a light rail network serving the metropolitan area of Tunis, the capital and largest city of Tunisia. Opened in 1985, the 45.2 km (28.1 mi) long network consists of 6 lines, and serves 65 stations. It is operated by the Société des transports de Tunis (Transtu).

The Metro was the first modern light rail system in Africa, the Arab World, and in the Mediterranean region, but it has since been joined by several different networks in places such as Algeria, Morocco, and the United Arab Emirates.

== History ==
=== Predecessors ===
Like most other major North African cities, Tunis (under colonial French rule) had an electric tram network that spanned a large part of the city.

On September 5, 1885, horse-drawn trams first appeared in the city with the introduction of five lines, all running on metre gauge track. The network, which was operated by the Société Anonyme des Tramways de Tunis of Belgium, was soon joined by the network of the French Compagnie Générale Française des Tramways (CGFT) exactly one year later on September 5, 1886. The network of the CGFT was built to the same specifications to that of the Société Anonyme des Tramways de Tunis, that being metre gauge tracks and horse-drawn vehicles. In 1899, however, both of these networks would come under the unified ownership of the CGFT. Starting in 1902, the CGFT began to electrify the existing network, and in the same year created the Compagnie des Tramways de Tunis (CTT).

Although the electric trams were popular, starting in the 1930s they began to be replaced by buses and trolleybuses. This replacement accelerated during the 1940s and 50s, and on March 8, 1960, the last trams ran on lines 3 and 4, thus signalling the end of the first-generation tramway.

=== Modern network ===
==== Initial planning and construction ====
After Tunisia gained independence from France in 1956, the country, and especially Tunis, experienced a sharp increase in population. As a result, the existing transport in the city soon proved to be largely inefficient and unprepared for the number of people using it.

In 1974, preliminary studies were officially launched for the development of a light rail network, and turnkey construction of the network was later entrusted to the German company Siemens. Siemens based the design of the network on that of the German city of Hanover, and was charged with the supply of the rolling stock, overhead power traction system, signalling and safety equipment, as well as the monitoring and coordination of construction. The first stone of the network was laid on November 23, 1980, and full construction of the first line of the system, from Tunis Marine station to Ben Arous, began in 1981.

The network officially entered service on October 13, 1985, with the beginning of operation on Line 1 from Tunis Marine to Ben Arous. Later, on September 5, 1989, Line 2 entered service with trains running from Place de Barcelone station on Line 1 north to Ariana, bringing the total length of the network up to 18.7 kilometres (11.6 mi).

==== Extensions ====
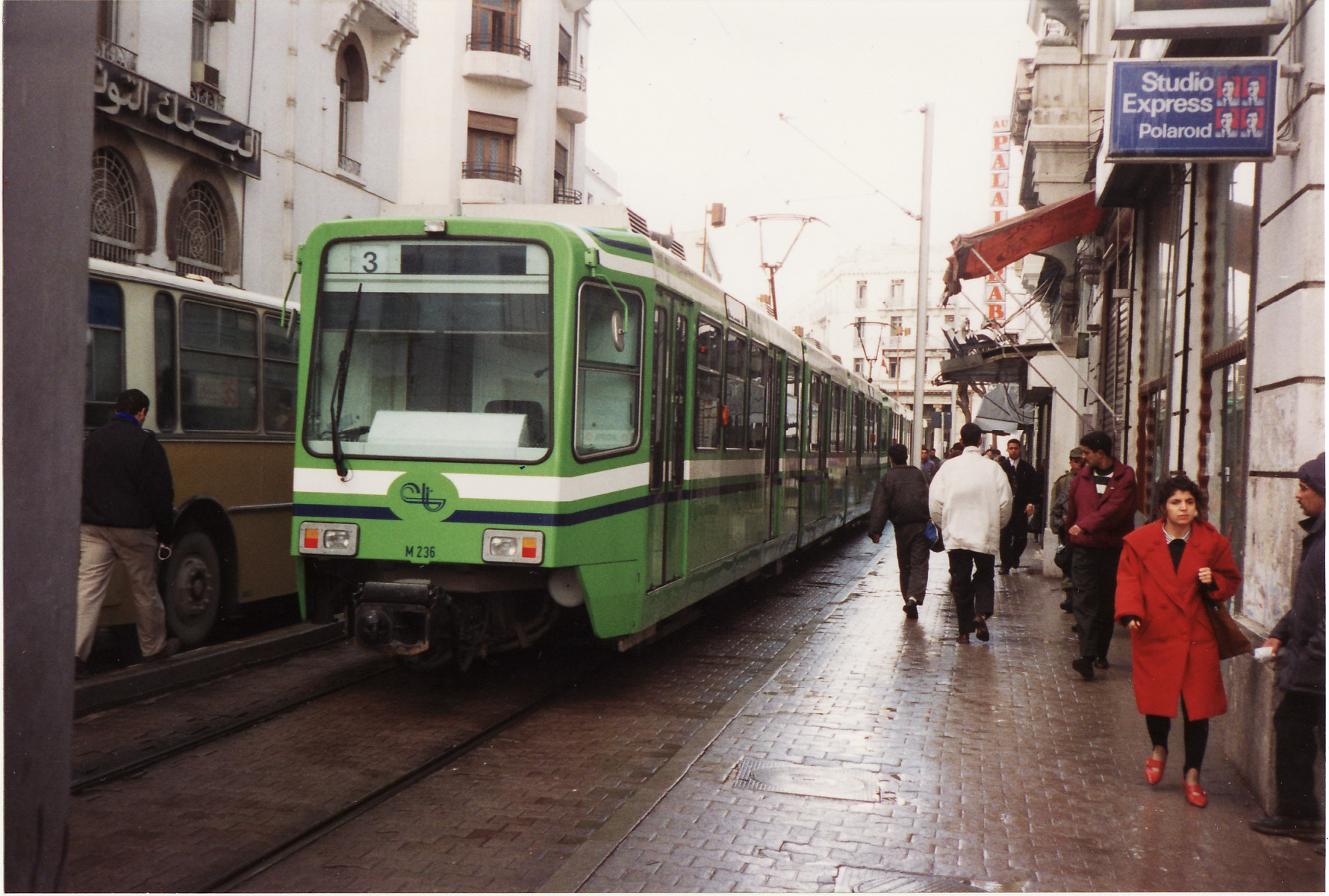
A TW 6000 LRV in the city centre, February 1994

On July 25, 1990, two branches were added to the network, serving the western districts of Tunis. This included Line 3 to Ibn Khaldoun, and Line 4 to Bardo, both of which start from Place de la République station on Line 2. Later, on November 7, 1992, Line 5 was created as a branch off of Line 3 from Les Jasmins station to Intilaka. Finally, on September 5, 1997, Line 4 was extended for 2.8 km (1.7 mi) from Bardo to Den Den. With the opening of the Line 4 extension, the network, as it was contracted by Siemens, was completed.

In April 2003, the Société du Métro Léger de Tunis (SMLT), the company which had operated the Metro network since its opening in 1985, merged with the Société Nationale des Transports (SNT) in order to create a unified transport body for the Tunis region, named the Société des transports de Tunis (operating under the commercial name of Transtu).

In June 2004, Transtu awarded a contract for the construction of a new line of the network, as well as for the supply of 30 new light rail vehicles, to the French company Alstom. The new line, numbered as line 6, would branch off of Line 1 at Mohamed Ali station and continue running south to El Mourouj, over a total length of 6.8 km (4.2 mi), while the new LRVs would be based on Alstom's Citadis low-floor design and would increase the overall capacity of the system by around 5 percent.

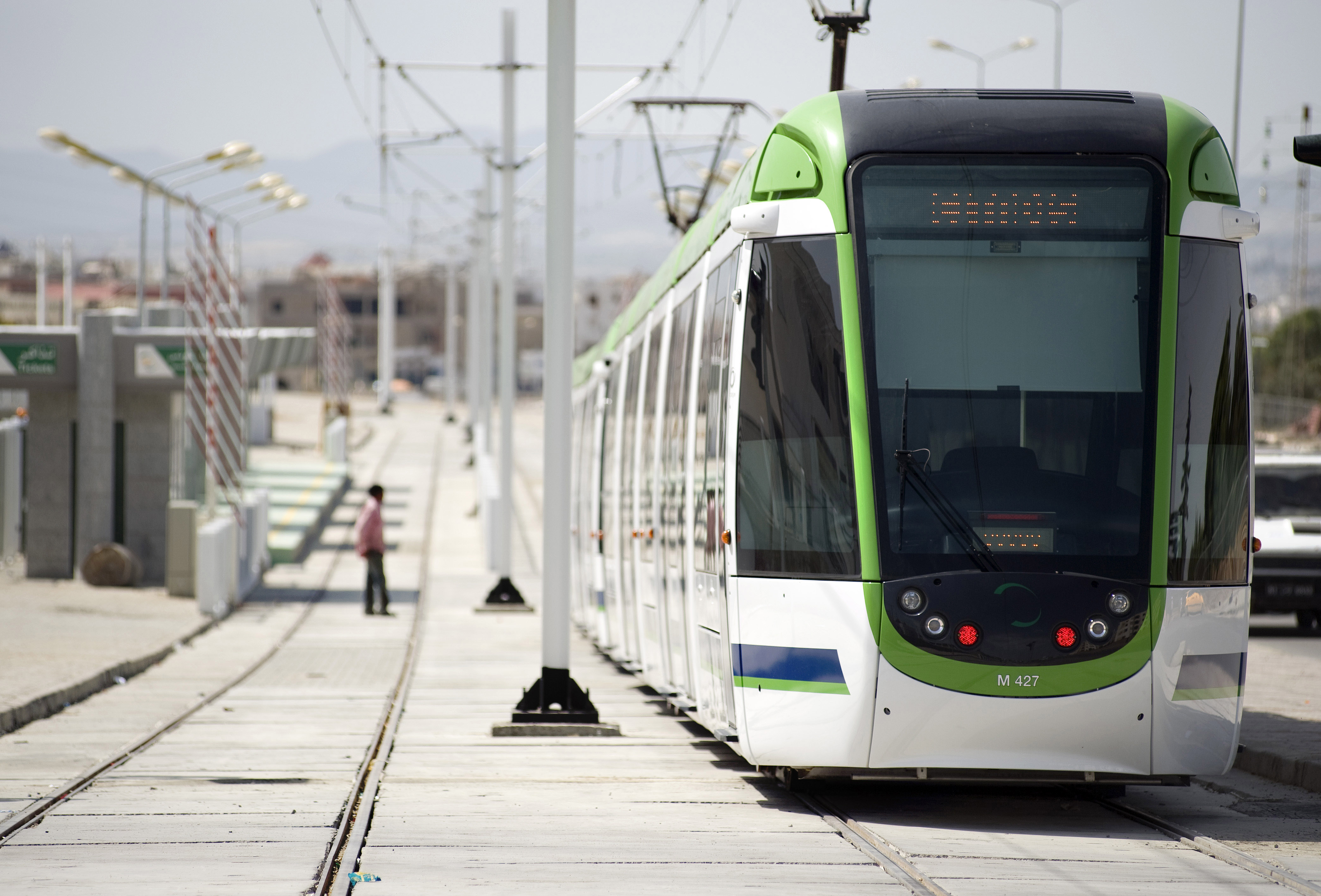
A Citadis LRV near L'Environnement station on Line 6 in June 2008, shortly before the line's opening

The first vehicles of the new fleet were delivered in March 2007, and entered service on Line 1 on September 17, 2007. The first section of Line 6, from Mohamed Ali to El Montazah, opened on August 11, 2008, and the line's second section from El Montazah to El Mourouj 4 later opened on November 12, 2008. The network's final extension, of Line 4 from Den Den station to Kheireddine, opened on December 11, 2009.

== Network ==
As of 2025, the Metro network consists of six lines and a total of 61.3 kilometres (38.1 mi) of track, with 65 stations in service.

Tunis Metro
Line	Length	Stations	Opened	Equipment
Place de Barcelone – Ben Arous	5.5 km	11	1985	Alstom Citadis 302
Place de la République – Ariana	6.3 km	12	1989	Siemens-Duewag TW 6000
Tunis Marine – Ibn Khaldoun	6.5 km	13	1990	Siemens-Duewag TW 6000
Place de Barcelone – Kheireddine	10 km	20	1990	Alstom Citadis 302
Place de Barcelone – Intilaka	7.1 km	14	1992	Siemens-Duewag TW 6000
Tunis Marine – El Mourouj 4	6.8 km	18	2008	Alstom Citadis 302

=== Line 1 ===
Place de Barcelone – Ben Arous

Line 1 is the first and oldest line of the network. Opened on October 13, 1985, it runs on a north-south axis from Place de Barcelone station in the city centre south to Ben Arous over a distance of 5.5 kilometres (3.4 mi), making it the shortest line of the network in terms of total trackage. Additionally, it is also the line with the least stations of the network, with a total of 11 stations served. It shares track with Line 6 for over half of its route, between Place de Barcelone and Mohamed Ali station.

When Line 1 originally opened, it started at Tunis Marine station rather than its current terminus at Place de Barcelone. However, as more lines of the network opened, the line was curtailed to Place de Barcelone, and the branch to Tunis Marine was taken over by lines 3 and 6. The line connects to the SNCFT national rail network, as well as the RFR lines A, D, and E, at Place de Barcelone station, and is operated with low-floor Alstom Citadis 302 vehicles.

=== Line 2 ===
Place de la République – Ariana

Line 2 runs on a north-south axis, similar to Line 1, from the city centre at Place de la République station to Ariana. Opened on September 5, 1989, the line covers a length of 6.3 kilometres (3.9 mi) over 11 stations. Upon its opening, the line originally ran from Place de Barcelone station, however services were later cut back to Place de la République in order to reduce high amounts of congestion in the city centre. Line 2 is the only line of the network to run entirely on its own trackage, with no shared sections present, and is operated with older high-floor Siemens-Duewag TW 6000 vehicles.

=== Line 3 ===
Tunis Marine – Ibn Khaldoun

Line 3 runs from Tunis Marine station in the city centre to Ibn Khaldoun on an east-west route, over a distance of 6.5 kilometres (4.0 mi) and a total of 13 stations. The line, which opened on July 25, 1990, shares a large majority of its trackage with other lines (mostly line 5), and the only section of track on which Line 3 trains exclusively run is the 0.6 km (0.37 mi) long branch from Les Jasmins to the line's terminus at Ibn Khaldoun. Connections on the line are possible to the Tunis-Goulette-Marsa (TGM) commuter railway at Tunis Marine station, and to the SNCFT national rail network and the RFR lines A, D, and E at Place de Barcelone station. Line 3 is operated with high-floor Siemens-Duewag TW 6000 vehicles.

=== Line 4 ===
Place de Barcelone – Kheireddine

Line 4 is the longest line of the network, extending for 10 kilometres (6.2 mi) from Place de Barcelone to Kheireddine on an east-west alignment, serving 20 stations along its route. The line originally opened from Bab Saadoun to Bardo over a distance of 2.2 kilometres (1.4 mi) on July 25, 1990, and was later extended further east to Den Den on September 5, 1997. The line's final extension, from Den Den to Kheireddine, opened on December 11, 2009. Line 4 is operated with low-floor Alstom Citadis 302 vehicles.

=== Line 5 ===
Place de Barcelone – Intilaka

Line 5 runs on an east-west alignment from Place de Barcelone to Intilaka over a distance of 7.1 kilometres (4.4 mi), with 14 stations served along its route. Opened on November 7, 1992, the line shares track with Line 3 for most of its route, and is operated with high-floor Siemens-Duewag TW 6000 vehicles.

=== Line 6 ===
Tunis Marine - El Mourouj 4

Line 6 is the newest line of the network, and runs on a north-south alignment from Tunis Marine station to El Mourouj 4 over a distance of 6.8 kilometres (4.2 mi), with 18 stations. The tender for the construction of Line 6 was awarded in June 2004 to the French company Alstom, and work started in 2005. The first section of the line, from Mohamed Ali to El Montazah, opened on August 11, 2008, and the full line up to El Mourouj 4 opened on November 12, 2008.

The line shares most of its track with Line 1, with the section from Place de Barcelone until Mohamed Ali also being used by Line 1 trains. Additionally, Line 6 is one of only two lines to terminate at the Tunis Marine transfer station, the other being Line 3. Since its inception, Line 6 has been operated with low-floor Alstom Citadis 302 vehicles.

=== Former lines ===
==== Line 12 ====
Line 12 was a peak-hour only line that ran from 10 Décembre station on Line 2 south through the city centre to El Ouardia 6 station on Line 1, over a distance of 12 kilometres. The line ran from 6:00 to 8:30 am, and from 5:00 to 7:30 pm.

==== Line 14 ====
Like Line 12, Line 14 was also a peak-hour only line. The line ran from Den Den station on Line 4 east to the city centre, then south on Line 1 trackage, terminating at El Ouardia 6 station. The line ran during the same hours as Line 12, with the morning rush being from 6:00 to 8:30 am, and the evening rush being from 5:00 to 7:30 pm.

== Infrastructure ==
=== Alignment ===
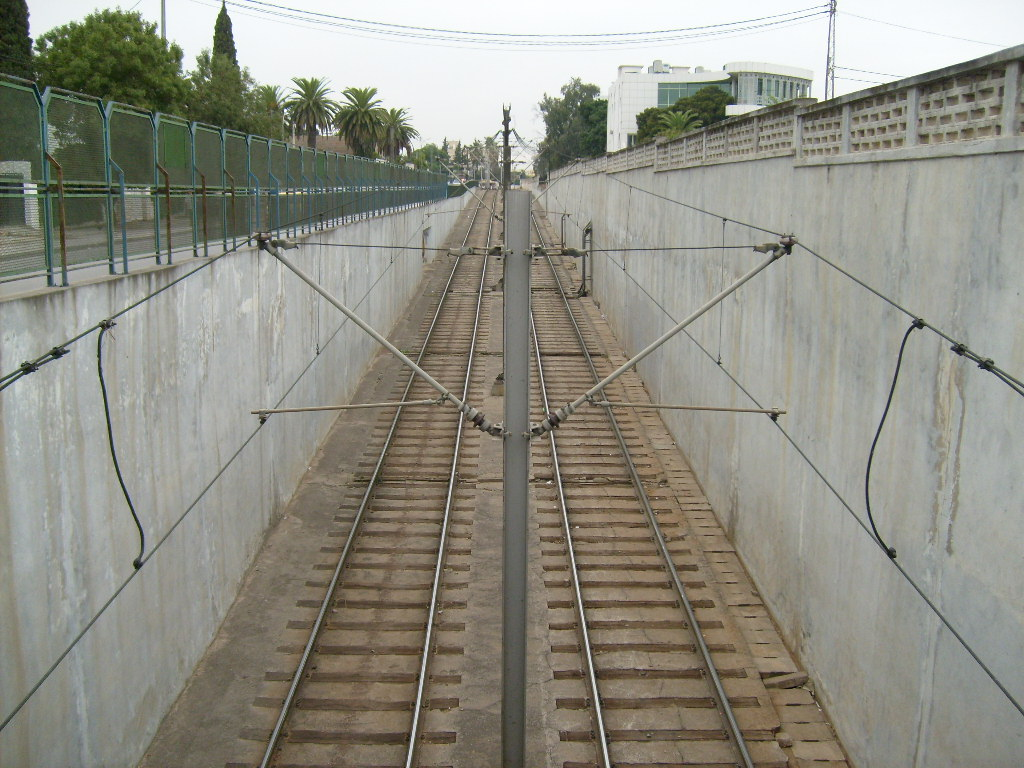
A tunnel ramp near Bardo station on Line 4, September 2008

Like most conventional modern light rail systems, the Tunis Metro runs entirely on its own reserved right-of-way, with no sections running in mixed traffic, thus allowing higher in-service speeds throughout the system. Although the system does have several level crossings that allow road vehicles to cross the tracks, it mostly enters tunnels in order to facilitate grade separation. However, despite the large number of tunnels on the system, all stations of the Metro are located at-grade. Within the city centre of Tunis, in between the stations of Place de Barcelone and Place de la République, the network splits off into two single-track lines which each run north-south on narrow inner-city streets.

=== Depots and yards ===
The network has two yards: one at Tunis Marine station, and another near Ariana station.

The depot at Tunis Marine is the primary yard of the network, and is also the original depot, having been built in phases from 1983 to 1992. It includes a track connection with the Tunis-Goulette-Marsa (TGM) local railway, and TGM trains may also use the yard, as they follow the same technical specifications as the Metro network.

The yard at Ariana, the northern terminus of Line 2, opened in 2001. Unlike the depot at Tunis Marine, which is located directly behind Tunis Marine station, the Ariana depot is located near Tunis-Carthage International Airport, and is thus linked by a 1.4 km (0.87 mi) long single-track branch line from Ariana station itself.

=== Stations ===
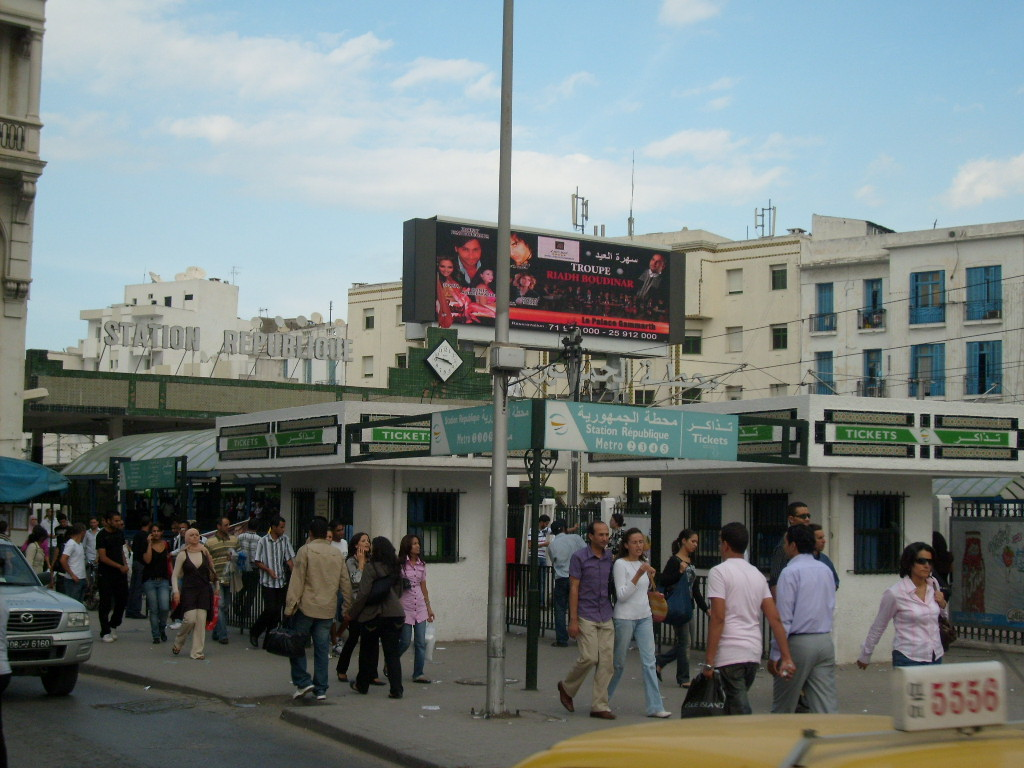
The entrance to Place de la République station in September 2008

Most stations on the Metro network follow a standardised design, with several large concrete shelters serving as covers for waiting areas, as well as a small ticket office. Some stations, such as Bab el Assel on lines 3, 4, and 5, or Palestine on Line 2, have staggered platforms due to the lack of space in the surrounding area for a single station. Additionally, intermodal stations, like El Montazah on Line 6, or Slimane-Kahia on Line 4, have multiple platforms and sidings for increased capacity.

The largest and most important stations of the network, Place de Barcelone and Place de la République, both of which are located in the city centre, serve as a transfer point between most lines of the network. As a result, they have a large number of platforms, terminating sidings, and facilities in order to handle the high numbers of both ridership and congestion that they receive.

In between Place de Barcelone and Place de la République, on the single-track lines running from north to south through the city centre, there were formerly two unidirectional stations on each of the lines, named Ibn Rachiq on the southbound track, and Habib Thameur on the northbound, both of which opened as part of Line 2 in 1989. Habib Thameur station closed on December 11, 2017, following a fire which badly damaged the station, and Ibn Rachiq was later also closed in order to speed up travel times through the city centre.

== Rolling stock ==
=== Siemens-Duewag TW 6000 ===
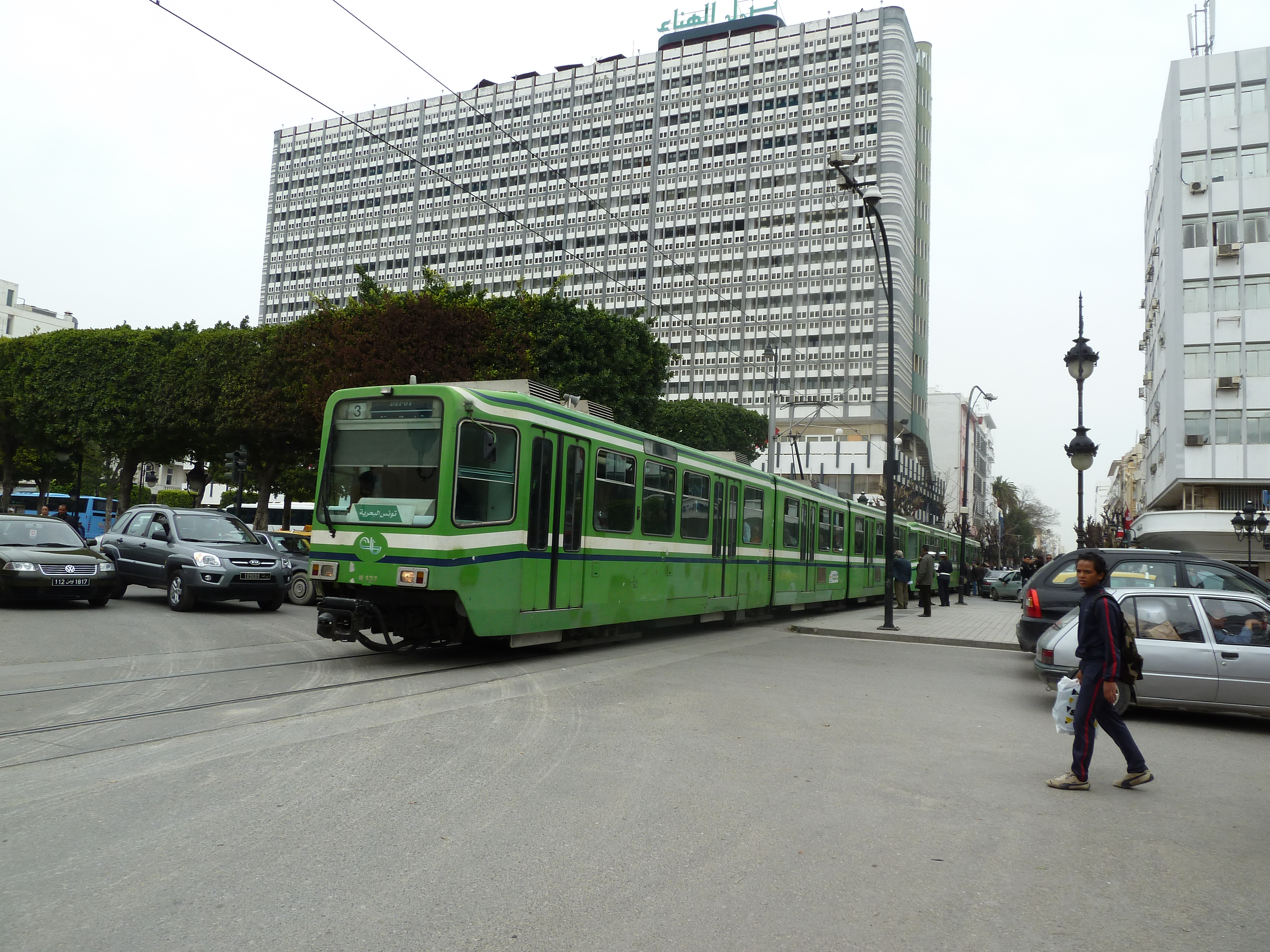
TW 6000 vehicle #M127 on the single-track section of the network in Tunis' city centre, April 2011

The first model of rolling stock to be used on the Metro was the Siemens-Duewag TW 6000, a model which was ordered as part of the turnkey contract for the construction of the network. The vehicles are derived from those used on the Hanover light rail system, and are bidirectional, with doors equipped for high platforms. Each vehicle has three sections, and are able to be coupled together. As of 2025, they are currently in service on lines 2, 3, and 5, and are based at both the Tunis Marine and Ariana depots.

A total of 135 TW 6000 vehicles were built in three batches between 1983 and 1997:

Fleet numbers	Quantity	Years built
M101-M178	78	1983-1985
M201-M243	43	1991-1992
M301-M314	14	1997

The technical specifications of the TW 6000 vehicles are as follows:

- Bogies: type Bo-2-2-Bo
- Electric motors: 2 x 240 kW
- Weight: 40 tonnes
- Length: 30 metres (98 ft)
- Width: 2.47 metres (8 ft 1 in)

=== Alstom Citadis 302 ===
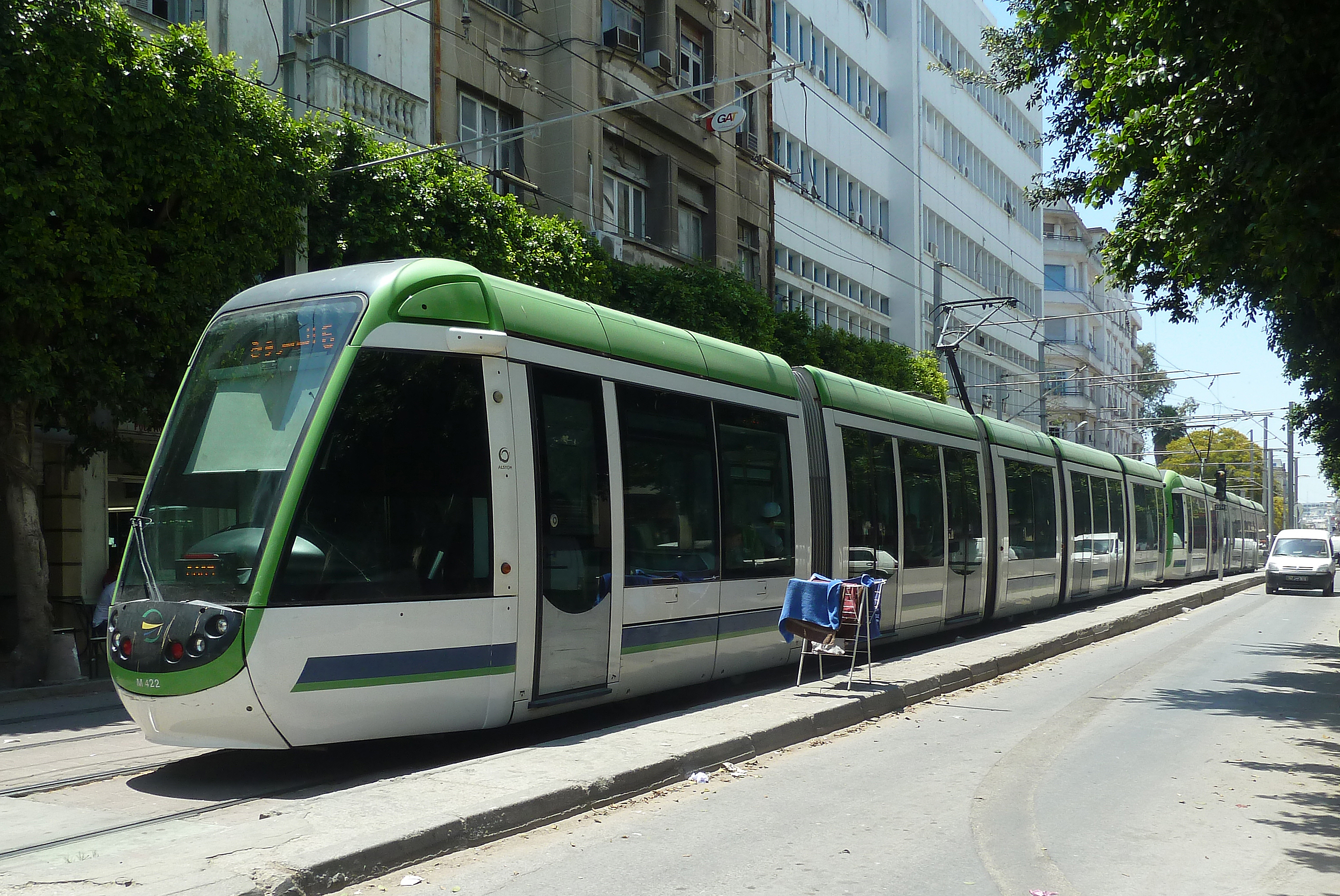
Citadis vehicle #M422 (and an additional tram coupled behind) on a Line 6 service to El Mourouj, June 2012

In January 2003, tenders were put out for the supply of 30 LRVs in order to increase capacity on the Metro network. Alstom won the contract in June 2004, and in March 2007, the first two vehicles were delivered. The first cars entered service on Line 1 on September 17, 2007. Unlike the TW 6000 LRVs, the Citadis 302 trams are unidirectional, with a single driver's cab at one end of each five-section vehicle. Consequently, the vehicles are always coupled back-to-back in service, thus contributing to a higher number of passengers per train. As the trams are low-floor, they required some modification to the network in order to facilitate their operation. As of 2025, they are in service on lines 1, 4, and 6. The vehicles are based entirely at Tunis Marine depot.

In addition to the 30 trainsets first delivered, nine trainsets were ordered in May 2007. A contract for 16 more trams was signed in July 2010, bringing the total number of Citadis vehicles to 55.

Fleet numbers	Quantity	Years built
M401-M430	30	2007-2008
M431-M439	9	2009
M501-M516	16	2012-2013

The technical specifications for the Citadis 302 vehicles are as follows:

- Length: 32 metres (105 ft) (64 metres (210 ft) when coupled in regular service)
- Width: 2.4 metres (7 ft 10 in)
- Height: 3.4 metres (11 ft)
- Electric motors: 4 x 120 kW

== See also ==
- List of Tunis Metro stations
- List of town tramway systems in Africa
- Réseau Ferroviaire Rapide
- Transport in Tunisia

== Notes ==
1. The Transtu website reports 61.3 kilometres (38.1 mi) of track, however this is measured in terms of single-track lines. In actuality, the network is closer to around 45 kilometres (28 mi) in length.
2. Although most of the line opened in 1985, El Ouardia 6 station opened a year after the rest of Line 1, in 1986.
