= Khereddine =

Khereddine خيرالدين
- Location in Tunisia
- Coordinates: 36°49′49.8″N 10°18′58.7″E
- Country: Tunisia
- Governorate: Tunis Governorate
- Time zone: UTC1 (CET)

Khereddine, also spelled Khéreddine or Kheireddine is a residential city in the northern suburbs of Tunis. Khereddine is linked to Tunis by the TGM railway.
