= Lycée Gustave Flaubert (La Marsa) =

Location
- 16 rue Othman Kaak, 2078 La Marsa; La Marsa; Tunisia
- Coordinates: 36.8801°N 10.3354°E

Information
- Website: erlm.tn/lgf/

Lycée Gustave Flaubert is a French international school in La Marsa, Tunisia. It serves levels sixième of collège (junior high school/middle school) until terminale, the final year of lycée (senior high school/sixth form college). It is directly operated by the Agency for French Education Abroad (AEFE), an agency of the French government.

The Société du Collège Maurice Cailloux, founded on October 1, 1948, by French officials and farmers, established the school, initially a private boarding school for French children. It was named the Collège Maurice Cailloux in 1952. The school was developed by the architect Tissot. The French government purchased the facility in 1957. It was originally established as a collège only and was an annex of the Lycée Français de Carthage, which at the time was newly built. Collège Cailloux was extended to the lycée level when the former Lycée Français de Carthage was given to the Tunisian government in 1961 as part of the independence of Tunisia. The school was officially renamed Lycée Gustave Flaubert, but is still popularly known as "lycée Cailloux" even after it adopted its current official name on May 27, 1998.

As of 2015-2016 it had 1,571 students and 220 staff.
