= Société des transports de Tunis =

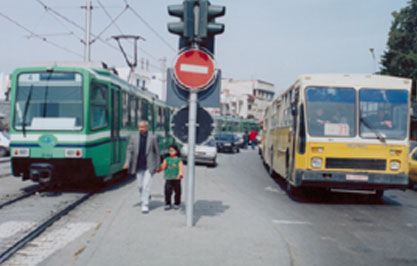
Métro léger and bus in Tunis

The Société des transports de Tunis or Transtu is the parastatal authority to manage public mass transit in the greater Tunis area (Grand Tunis). It supervises the bus network, the Métro léger de Tunis (a light railway system) and the TGM light rail link to La Marsa. Transtu was founded in 2003 when the Société nationale des transports (SNT) and the Société du métro léger de Tunis (SMLT) were combined. In 2023 Transtu carried 113 million passengers. The longest line is currently line 47.

== History ==
In 1872 Tunisia's first railway was inaugurated linking Tunis to La Goulette. The first trolley, initially horse-drawn, was opened in 1885; electrification of the trams started in 1902. A suburban train between Tunis, Bab Saadoun and La Manouba was opened in 1903. In 1930 bus service was started. By 1944, the trolleys were replaced by trolleybusses. After gaining independence, the transport systems in Tunis were nationalized. The Société nationale des transports (SNT) was charged to manage transit in the greater Tunis area in 1964. The Metro leger was subsequently created to provide a modern transit system without incurring the cost of building a subterranean metro. First trains on Line 1 began to operate between Tunis and Ben Arous in 1985. In 2003 the SNT and the Société du métro léger de Tunis were combined.

Transtu's passenger numbers fell from 335 million in 2010 to 113 million in 2023, as its fleet aged and some vehicles stood idle for lack of spare parts. In 2025 it received 165 used buses donated by Île-de-France Mobilités and the Paris operator RATP under an agreement signed on 27 January 2025, and in June 2025 the first 111 of 300 new buses ordered from a Chinese manufacturer. In September 2025 the Geneva public transport operator Transports Publics Genevois signed an agreement to donate almost 200 internal combustion buses to Transtu, to be handed over in the four years from January 2026.

== Network ==
The authority manages three networks:

- The bus system covers 5,836 kilometers in Tunis and surroundings serving a population of about 2 million people. 1,050 buses are covering 206 lines. The yellow buses indicate their terminals in Arabic and French.
- The Métro léger de Tunis consists of 6 lines that total 82 km; it will be further expanded.
- TGM connects Tunis and La Marsa.

== See also ==
- Transport in Tunisia
