= La Marsa =

La Marsa المرسى El Marsa
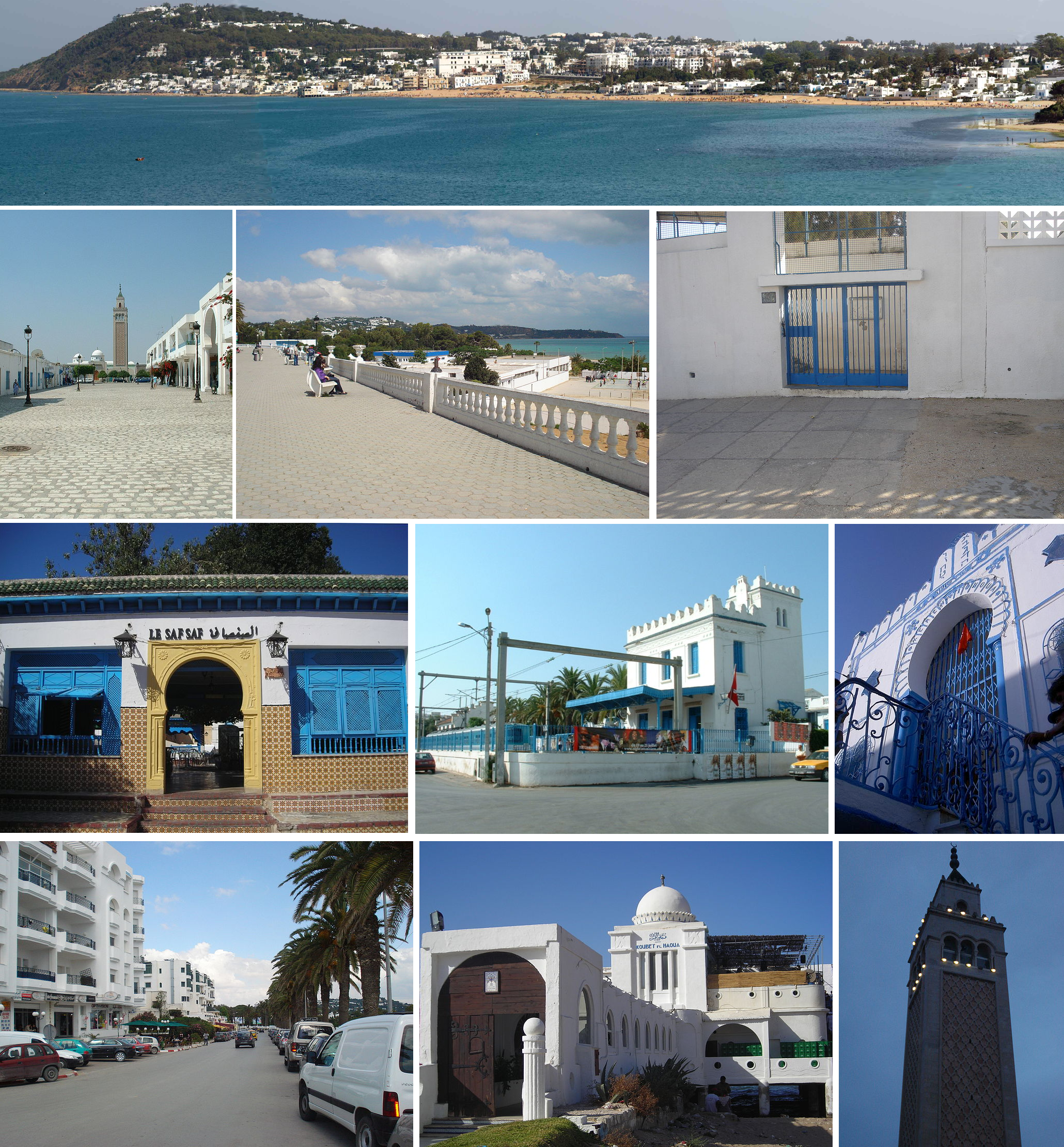
- Top:Panorama view of La Marsa and Marsa Beach, Second row:El Ahmadi Mosque and Abdelhafidh El Mekki Street, La Marsa Corniche, Gustaue Flaubert Secondary School, Third row:Saf-Saf Cafe, TGM Marsa Plage right-rail station, Synagogue Keren Yechoua de La Marsa, Bottom:Corniche Avenue, Koubet El Hooua, El Ahmadi Minaret Mosque (all item were from left to right)

- Location within Tunisia
- Coordinates: 36°52′35″N 10°19′31″E
- Country: Tunisia
- Governorate: Tunis Governorate
- Delegation(s): La Marsa

Government
  - Mayor: Moez Bouraoui (Independent)

Area
  - City: 4 km^{2} (1.5 sq mi)
  - Metro: 6 km^{2} (2.3 sq mi)

Population (2023)
  - City: 100,000
  - Density: 16,666/km^{2} (43,160/sq mi)
- Time zone: UTC+1 (CET)
  - Summer (DST): UTC+2 (CEST)

La Marsa (Tunisian Arabic: المرسى Il Marṣā) is a coastal city located in the northeastern part of Tunisia, situated along the Mediterranean Sea. It is part of the Tunis Governorate and has a population of around 100,000 people. The city is known for its beaches, upscale residential areas, and lively atmosphere, with numerous restaurants, cafes, and shops. It is connected to Tunis by the TGM railway. Gammarth is adjacent to El Marsa further up the coast.

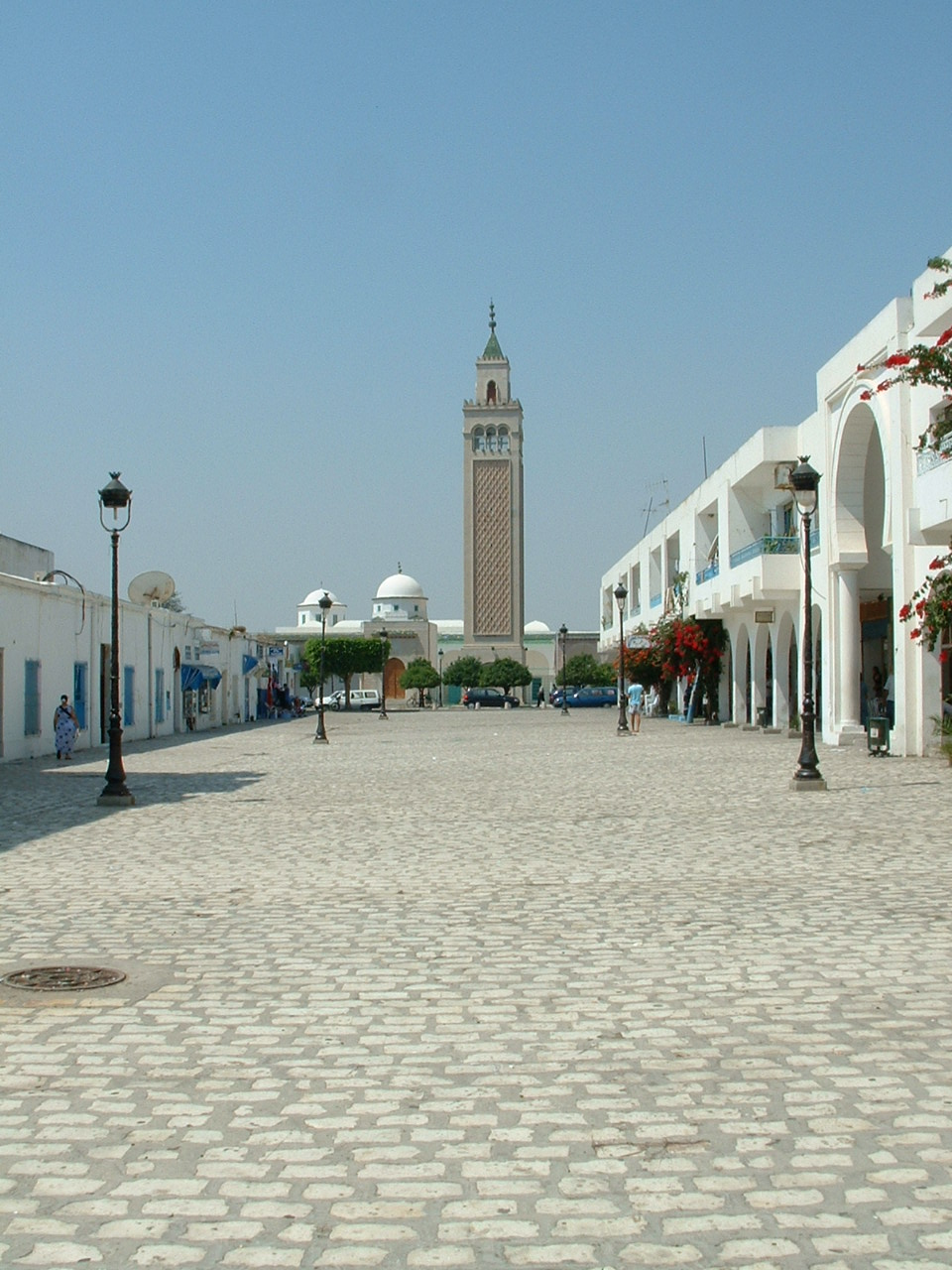
El Marsa

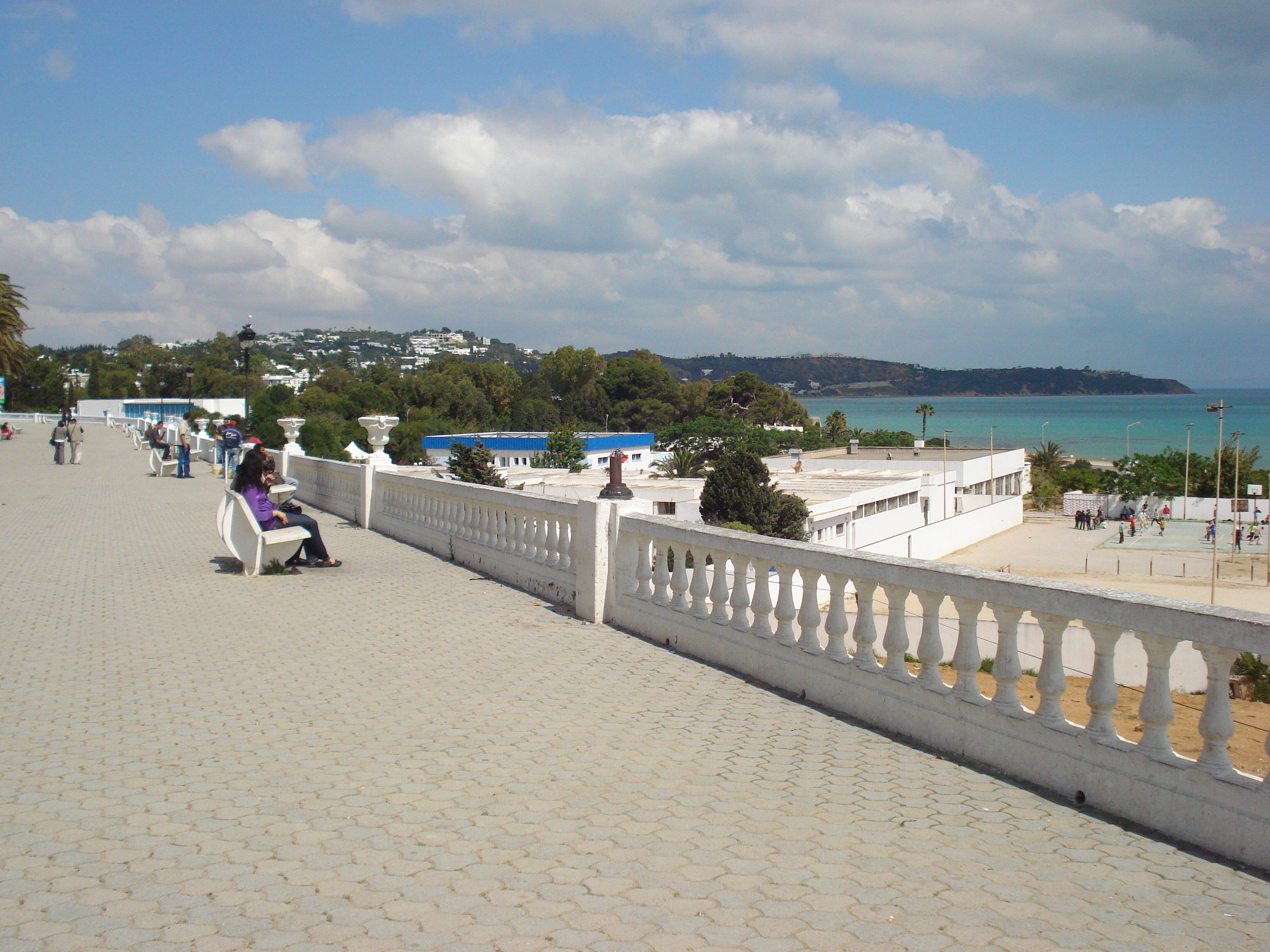
El Marsa beach

== History ==
- Ancient Carthage was a Semitic civilization centered on the Phoenician city-state of Carthage, located in North Africa on the Gulf of Tunis, outside what is now Tunis, Tunisia. It was founded in 814 BC. Originally a dependency of the Phoenician state of Tyre, Carthage gained independence around 650 BC and established a hegemony over other Phoenician settlements throughout the Mediterranean, North Africa and what is now Spain which lasted until the end of the 3rd century BC. At the height of the city's prominence, its political influence extended over most of the western Mediterranean and it was one of the major trade hubs.
- For much of its history, Carthage was in a constant state of struggle with the Greeks on Sicily and the Roman Republic, which led to a series of armed conflicts known as the Sicilian Wars and Punic Wars. They also had conflicts with the Berbers, the indigenous inhabitants of the entire area where Carthage was built. In 146 BC, after the third and final Punic War, Carthage was destroyed and then occupied by Roman forces. Nearly all of the other Phoenician city-states and former Carthaginian dependencies fell into Roman hands from then on.

The Dar al-Taj Palace was a favourite residence of the Beys of Tunis, but was destroyed in the years after the Tunisian independence.

== Attractions ==
- Abdalliya Palace is a notable work of the Hafsid dynasty sultans. Built in the early sixteenth century by one of their last sovereigns, Abu Abdallah Mohamed, this palace stands on the ancient port site of El Marsa.

== Education ==
La Marsa houses the following French international schools:

- Lycée Gustave Flaubert
- École Paul-Verlaine

They are a part of the Etablissement Régional De La Marsa (ELRM) which has 7 schools in Tunisia as members.

La Marsa also houses five primary schools:

- École primaire Habib Bourguiba
- École primaire Nahj el Ward
- École primaire Taieb El Mhiri
- École primaire El Tabbek
- École primaire El Riadh

La Marsa also houses 3 middle schools:

- Collège fadhel ben achour
- Collège tayeb mhiri
- Collège Rmila

Taïeb Mhiri School is a secondary school in La Marsa.

== Transport ==
- Tunis-Goulette-Marsa (TGM) is a 19 km 1,435 mm (4 ft 8 1/2 in) standard gauge light rail line linking the capital Tunis with El Marsa via La Goulette.
- The TGM was the first railway in Tunisia and inaugurated in 1872. Since 1905 it has been known as the TGM. It is part of the transportation system of the Tunis area, and together with the light rail of Tunis (Le métro léger de Tunis) managed by the Société des transports de Tunis (Transtu). Transtu was founded in 2003 by joining the Société du métro léger de Tunis (SMLT, founded 1981) and the Société nationale de transports (SNT, founded 1963).

Transports that passes through the N9 Highway:

- The bus line N°20 from Tunis Passage to La Marsa El Riadh, managed by the Société des transports de Tunis (Transtu)
- The bus line TCV from Tunis Passage to La Marsa Sidi Abdelaziz managed by a private company (Transport En Commun De Voyageur)
- The collective taxi (Taxi jama3i) is the fastest way to go to La Marsa from Tunis

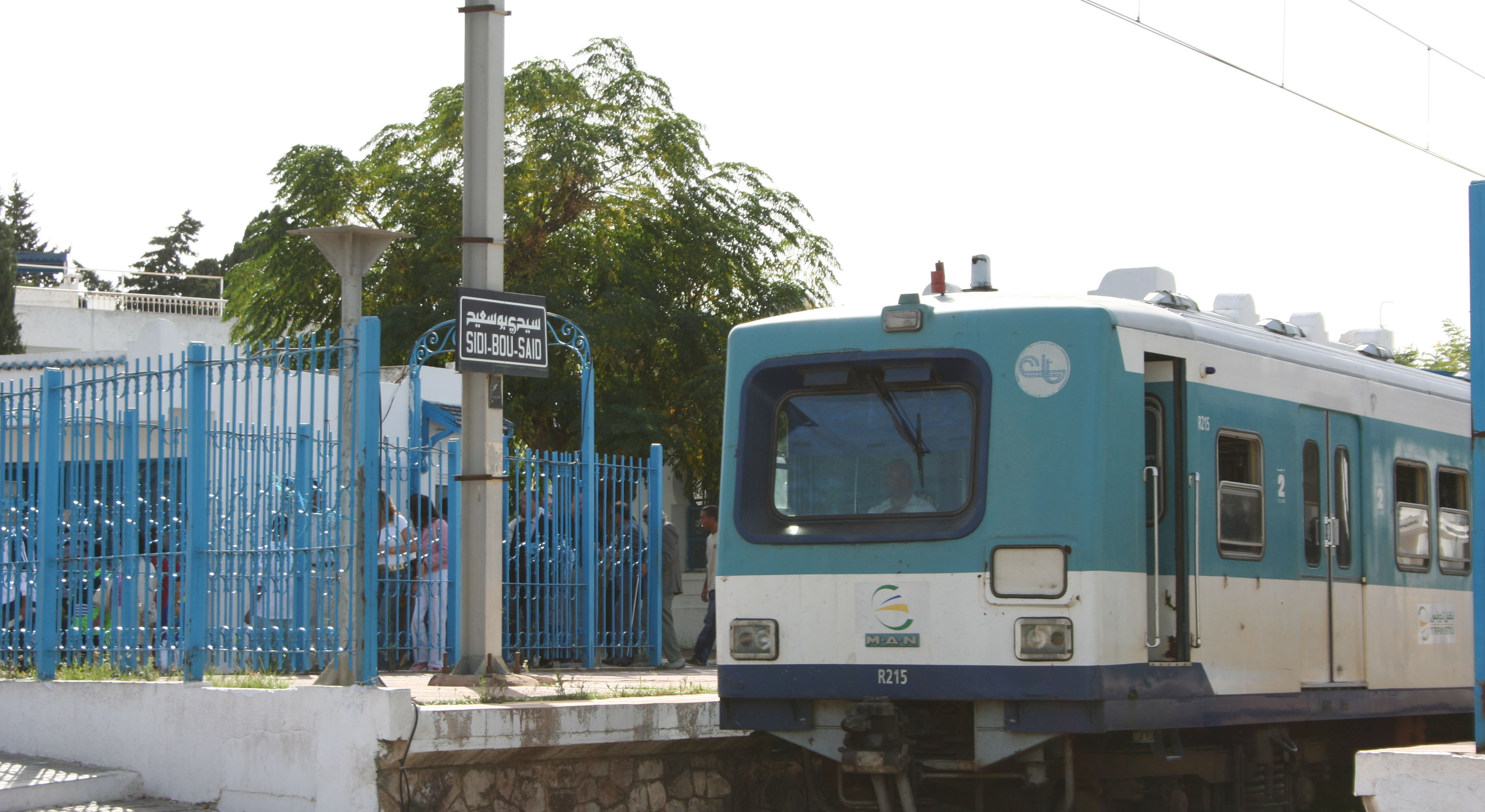
TGM

== Sport ==
- AS Marsa

Avenir Sportif de El Marsa (Arabic: المستقبل الرياضي بالمرسى, often referred to as ASM) is a football club from El Marsa in Tunisia. Founded in 1939, the team plays in green and yellow colours. Their ground is Stade Abdelaziz Chtioui, which has a capacity of 6,000. When the club was founded its name was Club Musulman (Muslim Club).

- Stade Abdelaziz Chtioui

Stade Abdelaziz Chtioui (Arabic: ملعب عبدالعزيز شتوي) is a football stadium in El Marsa, Tunisia. It is currently used by football team Avenir Sportif de El Marsa commonly called the AS Marsa. The stadium holds 6,000 people.
