= List of Tunis Metro stations =

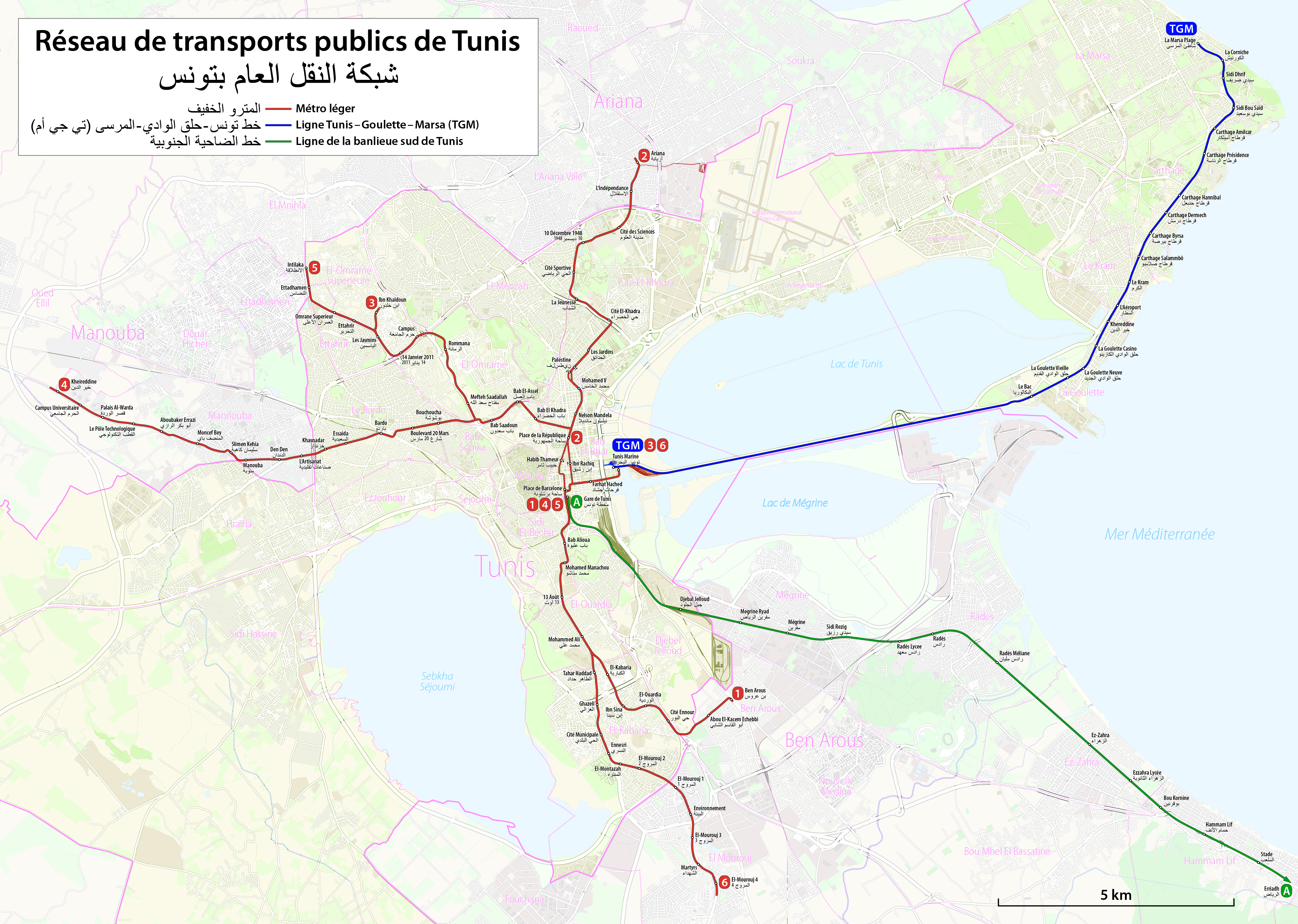
Metro leger's network, 2007

Following is a list of stations of the Metro of Tunis, the light rail serving the city of Tunis.

== Line 1 ==
Line 1 opened in 1985.

Line		Stations	Geographical coordinates	Delegation	P+R	Correspondences
	■	Place de Barcelone	36°47′46″N 10°10′50″E	Bab el Bhar		+ Gare de Tunis
	•	Bab Alioua	36°47′09″N 10°10′47″E	Sidi el Béchir
	•	Mohamed-Manachou	36°46′56″N 10°10′47″E	Sidi el Béchir
	•	13-Août	36°46′30″N 10°10′45″E	Sidi el Béchir
	•	Mohamed Ali	36°46′04″N 10°11′02″E	El Ouardia
	•	El Kabaria	36°45′35″N 10°11′26″E	El Kabaria
	•	Ibn Sina	36°45′15″N 10°11′38″E	El Kabaria
	•	El Ouardia VI	36°45′15″N 10°11′57″E	El Kabaria
	•	Cité Ennour	36°45′05″N 10°12′17″E	El Kabaria
	•	Abou El Kacem Echebbi	36°45′09″N 10°12′53″E	Ben Arous
	■	Ben Arous	36°45′20″N 10°13′13″E	Ben Arous

== Line 2 ==
Line 2 opened in 1989.

Line		Stations	Geographical coordinates	Delegation	P+R	Correspondences
	■	Place de la République	36°48′23″N 10°10′51″E	Bab el Bhar
	•	Nelson-Mandela	36°48′40″N 10°10′57″E	Bab el Bhar
	•	Mohammed-V	36°48′57″N 10°11′00″E	Bab el Bhar
	•	Place de Palestine	36°49′09″N 10°10′52″E	Cité El Khadra
	•	Les Jardins	36°49′24″N 10°11′08″E	Cité El Khadra
	•	Cité El Khadra	36°49′45″N 10°11′25″E	Cité El Khadra
	•	La Jeunesse	36°50′00″N 10°10′58″E	Cité El Khadra
	•	Cité sportive	36°50′19″N 10°10′55″E	El Menzah
	•	10-Décembre-1984	36°50′40″N 10°11′04″E	Cité El Khadra
	•	Cité des sciences (El Fell)	36°50′49″N 10°11′33″E	Cité El Khadra
	•	L'indépendance	36°51′16″N 10°11′45″E	L'Ariana
	■	Ariana	36°51′35″N 10°11′51″E	Ariana

== Line 3 ==
Line 3 opened in 1990.

Line		Stations	Geographical coordinates	Delegation	P+R	Correspondences
	■	Tunis Marine	36°48′00″N 10°11′34″E	Bab el Bhar		+ TGM
	•	Farhat-Hached	36°47′52″N 10°11′10″E	Bab el Bhar
	■	Place de Barcelone	36°47′46″N 10°10′50″E	Bab el Bhar		+ Gare de Tunis
	•	~~Habib-Thameur~~	unserved (2019)	Bab el Bhar
	•	Place de la République	36°48′23″N 10°10′51″E	Bab el Bhar
	•	Bab El Khadra	36°48′37″N 10°10′21″E	Bab Souika
	•	Bab Laassal	36°48′48″N 10°10′05″E	Bab Souika
	•	Bab Saadoun	36°48′35″N 10°09′43″E	Bab Souika
	•	Meftah Sâadallah	36°48′47″N 10°09′23″E	El Omrane
	•	Rommana	36°49′25″N 10°09′03″E	El Omrane
	•	Université de Tunis - El Manar	36°49′34″N 10°08′38″E	El Omrane supérieur
	•	14-Janvier 2011	36°49′22″N 10°08′24″E	El Omrane supérieur
	•	Les Jasmins	36°49′33″N 10°08′05″E	Ettahrir / El Omrane supérieur
	■	Ibn Khaldoun	36°49′51″N 10°08′03″E	El Omrane supérieur

== Line 4 ==
Line 4 opened in 1990.

Line		Stations	Geographical coordinates	Delegation	P+R	Correspondences
	■	Place de Barcelone	36°47′46″N 10°10′50″E	Bab el Bhar		+ Gare de Tunis
	•	~~Habib-Thameur~~	unserved (2019)	Bab el Bhar
	■	Place de la République	36°48′23″N 10°10′51″E	Bab el Bhar
	•	Bab El Khadra	36°48′37″N 10°10′21″E	Bab Souika
	•	Bab Laassal	36°48′48″N 10°10′05″E	Bab Souika
	•	Bab Saadoun	36°48′35″N 10°09′43″E	Bab Souika
	•	Bouchoucha	36°48′33″N 10°08′56″E	Bab Souika / Bardo
	•	20-Mars	36°48′30″N 10°08′34″E	Bardo
	•	Bardo	36°48′26″N 10°08′07″E	Bardo
	•	Essaidia	36°48′19″N 10°07′36″E	Bardo
	•	Khaznadar	36°48′15″N 10°07′18″E	Bardo
	•	L'Artisanat	36°48′10″N 10°06′58″E	Manouba
	•	Den Den	36°48′08″N 10°06′39″E	Manouba
	•	Manouba	36°48′08″N 10°06′09″E	Manouba
	•	Slimane-Kahia	36°48′12″N 10°05′57″E	Manouba
	•	Moncef-Bey	36°48′19″N 10°05′26″E	Manouba
	•	Aboubaker El Razi	36°48′27″N 10°04′57″E	Manouba
	•	Le Pôle technologique	36°48′33″N 10°04′32″E	Manouba
	•	Ksar El Warda	36°48′37″N 10°04′05″E	Manouba
	•	Campus de Manouba	36°48′47″N 10°03′43″E	Manouba
	■	Kheireddine	36°48′55″N 10°03′24″E	Manouba

== Line 5 ==
Line 5 opened in 1992.

Line		Stations	Geographical coordinates	Delegation	Correspondences
	■	Place de Barcelone	36°47′46″N 10°10′50″E	Bab el Bhar	+ Gare de Tunis
	•	~~Habib-Thameur~~	unserved (2019)	Bab el Bhar
	■	Place de la République	36°48′23″N 10°10′51″E	Bab el Bhar
	•	Bab El Khadra	36°48′37″N 10°10′21″E	Bab Souika
	•	Bab Laassal	36°48′48″N 10°10′05″E	Bab Souika
	•	Bab Saadoun	36°48′35″N 10°09′43″E	Bab Souika
	•	Meftah Sâadallah	36°48′47″N 10°09′23″E	El Omrane
	•	Rommana	36°49′25″N 10°09′03″E	El Omrane
	•	Université de Tunis - El Manar	36°49′34″N 10°08′38″E	El Omrane supérieur
	•	14-Janvier 2011	36°49′22″N 10°08′24″E	El Omrane supérieur
	•	Les Jasmins	36°49′33″N 10°08′05″E	Ettahrir
	•	Ettahrir	36°49′45″N 10°07′43″E	Ettahrir
	•	Omrane supérieur	36°49′50″N 10°07′26″E	Ettahrir
	•	Ettadhamen	36°50′09″N 10°07′04″E	Ettadhamen
	■	Intilaka	36°50′21″N 10°07′01″E	Ettadhamen

== Line 6 ==
Line 6 opened in 2008. the metro line is going to get extended with a new station in mourouj 6.

Line		Stations	Geographical coordinates	Delegation	Correspondences
	■	Tunis Marine	36°48′00″N 10°11′34″E	Bab el Bhar	+ TGM
	•	Farhat-Hached	36°47′52″N 10°11′10″E	Bab el Bhar
	■	Place de Barcelone	36°47′46″N 10°10′50″E	Bab el Bhar	+ Gare de Tunis
	•	Bab Alioua	36°47′09″N 10°10′47″E	Sidi El Béchir
	•	Mohamed-Manachou	36°46′56″N 10°10′47″E	Sidi El Béchir
	•	13-Août	36°46′30″N 10°10′45″E	Sidi El Béchir
	•	Mohamed-Ali	36°46′04″N 10°11′02″E	El Ouardia
	•	Tahar-Haddad	36°45′39″N 10°11′13″E	El Kabaria
	•	Ghazeli	36°45′17″N 10°11′16″E	El Kabaria
	•	Cité municipale	36°44′54″N 10°11′20″E	El Kabaria
	•	Ennesri	36°44′42″N 10°11′25″E	El Kabaria
	•	El Montazah	36°44′34″N 10°11′37″E	El Kabaria
	•	El Mourouj 2	36°44′32″N 10°11′52″E	El Kabaria
	•	El Mourouj 1	36°44′18″N 10°12′24″E	El Mourouj
	•	Environnement	36°43′59″N 10°12′37″E	El Mourouj
	•	El Mourouj 3	36°43′43″N 10°12′39″E	El Mourouj
	•	Martyrs	36°43′25″N 10°12′43″E	El Mourouj
	■	El Mourouj 4	36°43′11″N 10°12′59″E	El Mourouj
