= Bab Lakouas =

Bab Lakouas (Arabic: باب الأقواس) is one of the gates of the medina of Tunis, located to the west of the ancient ramparts, between Bab Saadoun and Bab Souika and close to the Halfaouine district. It disappeared with the enclosure of the city.
