= Réseau Ferroviaire Rapide =

Suburban rail network serving Tunis, Tunisia

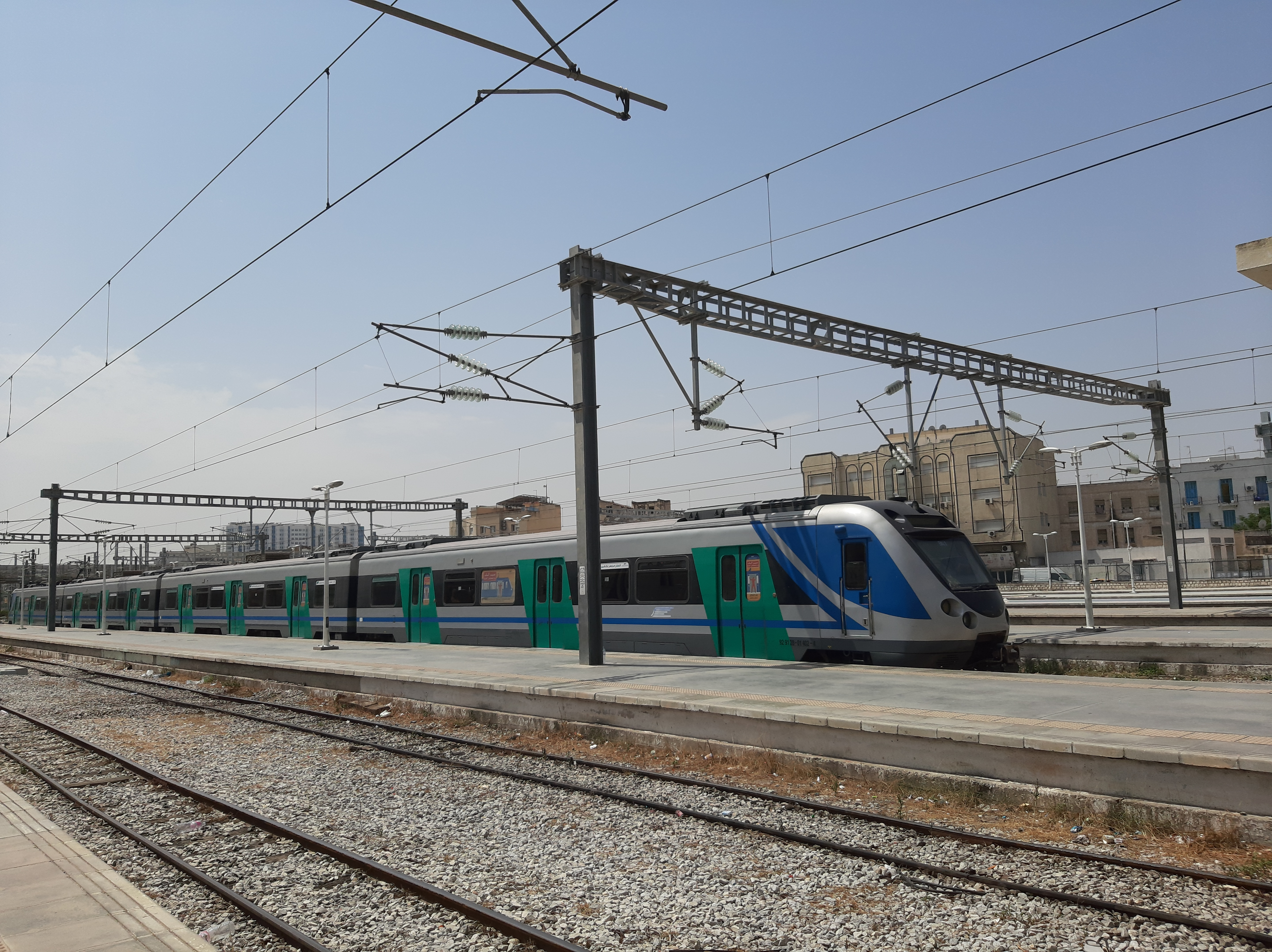
- A Line A train at Tunis Central station in August 2020.

Overview
- Native name: الشبكة الحديدية السريعة بتونس
- Owner: Société Nationale des Chemins de Fer Tunisiens (SNCFT)
- Area served: Tunis, Ben Arous, and Manouba, Tunisia
- Transit type: Commuter rail
- Number of lines: 3
- Number of stations: 31

Operation
- Began operation: April 6, 2012
- Operator: Société Nationale des Chemins de Fer Tunisiens (SNCFT)

Technical
- System length: 47.2 km (29.3 mi)
- Track gauge: 1,000 mm (3 ft 3 3/8 in) metre gauge (Line A); 1,435 mm (4 ft 8 1/2 in) standard gauge (Line D/E)
- Electrification: 25 kV 50 Hz AC overhead line

The Réseau Ferroviaire Rapide (English: Rapid Rail Network, Arabic: الشبكة الحديدية السريعة بتونس; commonly abbreviated RFR) is a suburban rail network serving the metropolitan area of Tunis, the capital and largest city of Tunisia. Opened in 2012, the 47 km (29 mi) long network consists of three lines and serves 31 stations. It is operated by the Société Nationale des Chemins de Fer Tunisiens (SNCFT), Tunisia's national railway authority.

== History ==
Plans for an electrified rail network serving Tunis’ outer suburbs had been envisaged since the 1960s, however it wasn't until the early 1990s that concrete plans started. The first line to be proposed for electrification was the Tunis-Bordj Cédria line in 1990, a line which had opened in 1882 and had been continuously upgraded since the mid-1980s. Funding for the electrification of the line was eventually secured in April 2001.

On July 18, 2007, the Société du Réseau Ferroviaire Rapide de Tunis (RFR) was created for the realisation, implementation, and construction of the electrified rail network, now also branded as the RFR. As part of the project, the existing plans for the electrification of the Tunis-Bordj Cédria line were integrated into the RFR network as Line A. Additionally, planning for four new lines started, including lines C, D, E, and F.

Work on the Line A project continued, and in November 2007, a contract was signed with Hyundai Rotem for the supply of 19 four-car metre gauge EMUs for operation on the line. Later, in February 2008, the contract for the electrification of the line was awarded to a consortium of Alstom and Ansaldo STS (now Hitachi Rail STS). The first Line A train was delivered in February 2010.

In November 2010, the RFR awarded a consortium of Systra and Studi the contract for construction management of the first phase of the RFR project, consisting of lines D and E. Line A entered service on April 6, 2012, however the line's official inauguration wouldn't be held until June 19, 2012.

In February 2013, the contract for the construction of lines D and E was officially awarded to a consortium of Siemens Mobility, Colas Rail, and Somatra-Get. Later, in October 2016, the RFR selected Hyundai Rotem for the supply of 28 standard-gauge trains to operate on lines D and E, with the contract for the trains being signed later in December of that year. In December 2017, extra funding for the completion of the first phase was provided by the European Investment Bank (EIB).

The first phase of the project was planned to open in 2019, however as time progressed, the completion of both lines became heavily delayed. The first trains for lines D and E were delivered in August 2019.

Line E officially entered service from Tunis Central station to Bougatfa–Sidi Hassine on March 20, 2023. Test running on Line D started in early January 2025, and the line entered service from Tunis Central to Gobâa on January 25, 2025.

== Lines ==
=== Line A ===
Tunis Central - Erriadh

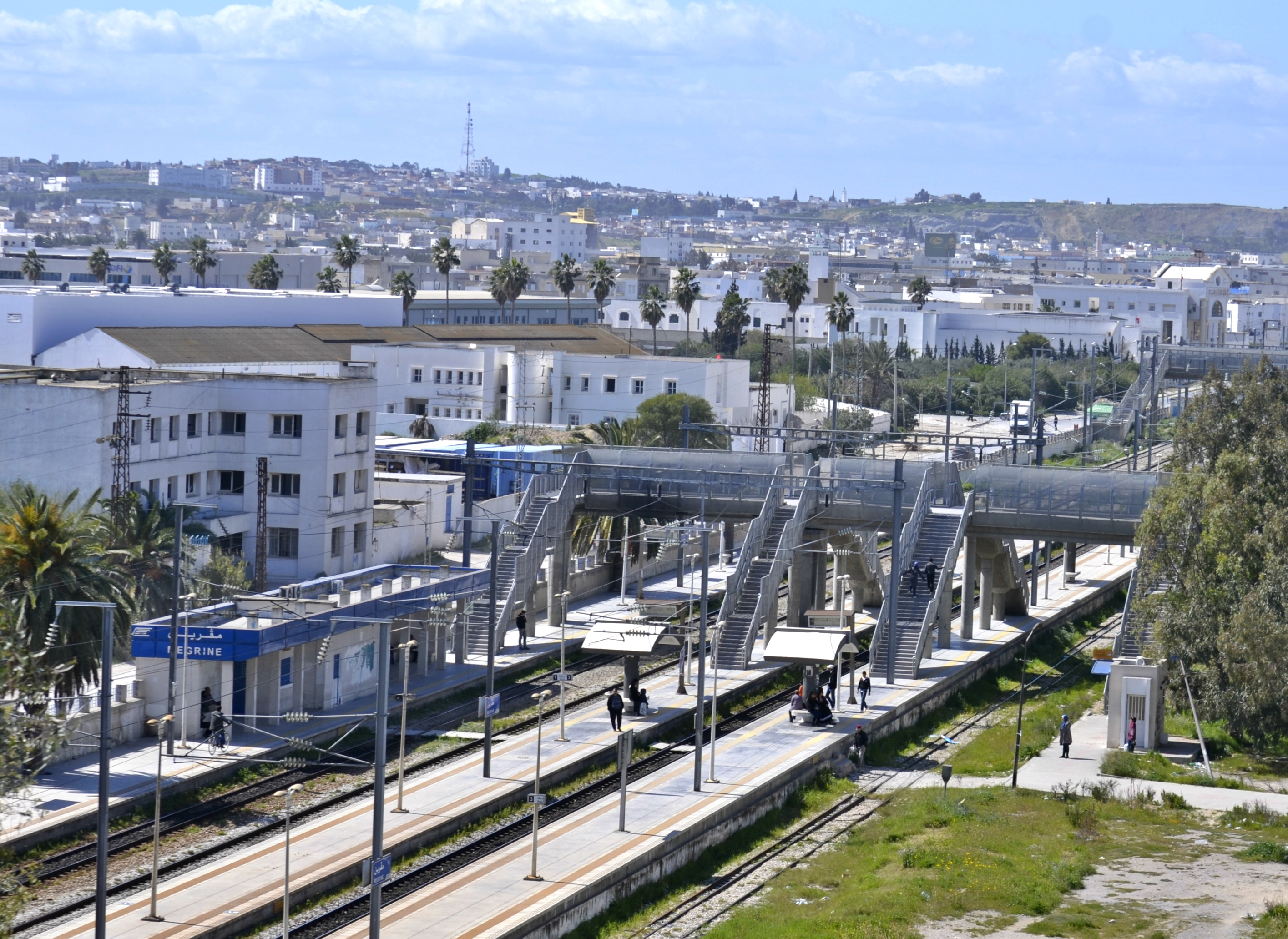
Mégrine station in 2013.

Line A is the oldest and longest line of the network, running on a north–south axis from Tunis Central station to Erriadh over a distance of 25 kilometres (16 mi) and serving 18 stations. Opened on April 6, 2012, the line is also currently the only metre gauge line of the RFR network, running on the SNCFT's southern mainline network.

| | Stations | Commune served | Connections |
|---|---|---|---|
| ● | Tunis Central | Tunis | Tunis Metro: |
| • | Jebel Jelloud | Djebel Jelloud | |
| • | Mégrine Riadh | Mégrine | |
| • | Mégrine | Mégrine | |
| • | Sidi Rézig | Mégrine | |
| • | Lycée Radès | Radès | |
| • | Radès | Radès | |
| • | Radès Méliane | Radès | |
| • | Ez-Zahra | Ezzahra | |
| • | Lycée Ezzahra | Ezzahra | |
| • | Boukornine | Hammam Lif | |
| • | Hammam Lif | Hammam Lif | |
| • | Arrêt du Stade | Hammam Lif | |
| • | Tahar Sfar | Hammam Chott | |
| • | Hammam Chatt | Hammam Chott | |
| • | Bir El Bey | Hammam Chott | |
| • | Borj Cédria | Borj Cédria | |
| ● | Erriadh | Borj Cédria | |

=== Line D ===
Tunis Central - Gobâa

Line D is the newest line of the network, having opened on January 25, 2025. Like Line A, Line D runs on an existing SNCFT mainline alignment, however instead of metre gauge tracks, the line runs on the standard-gauge mainline from Tunis to Ghardimaou. The line runs from Tunis Central to Gobâa on an east–west route over a total distance of 13.2 kilometres (8.2 mi) and serves 9 stations, sharing track with Line E from Tunis to Saida Manoubia.

| | Stations | Commune served | Connections |
|---|---|---|---|
| ● | Tunis Central | Tunis | Tunis Metro: |
| • | Saida Manoubia | Tunis | |
| • | Mellassine | Mellassine | |
| • | Erraoudha | Le Bardo | |
| • | Bardo | Le Bardo | Tunis Metro: |
| • | El Bortal | Le Bardo | |
| • | Manouba | La Manouba | |
| • | Cité des Orangers | La Manouba | |
| ● | Gobâa | La Manouba | |

=== Line E ===
Tunis Central - Bougatfa/Sidi Hassine

Line E is the shortest line of the network, running over a distance of 9 kilometres (5.6 mi) and 7 stations on an east–west route from Tunis Central to Bougatfa. Unlike lines A and D, Line E runs mostly on an entirely new alignment, serving the communities on the northern and western shores of Lake Séjoumi, an area previously unserved by any form of rail transit. As a result, the line, which opened on March 20, 2023, mostly runs elevated and at-grade.

| | Stations | Commune served | Connections |
|---|---|---|---|
| ● | Tunis Central | Tunis | Tunis Metro: |
| • | Saida Manoubia | Tunis | |
| • | Ennajah | Tunis | |
| • | Ettayaran–Ezzouhour 1 | Ezzouhour | |
| • | Ezzouhour 2 | Ezzouhour | |
| • | El Hrairia | El Hraïria | |
| ● | Bougatfa–Sidi Hassine | Sidi Hassine | |

== Rolling stock ==
=== Line A ===
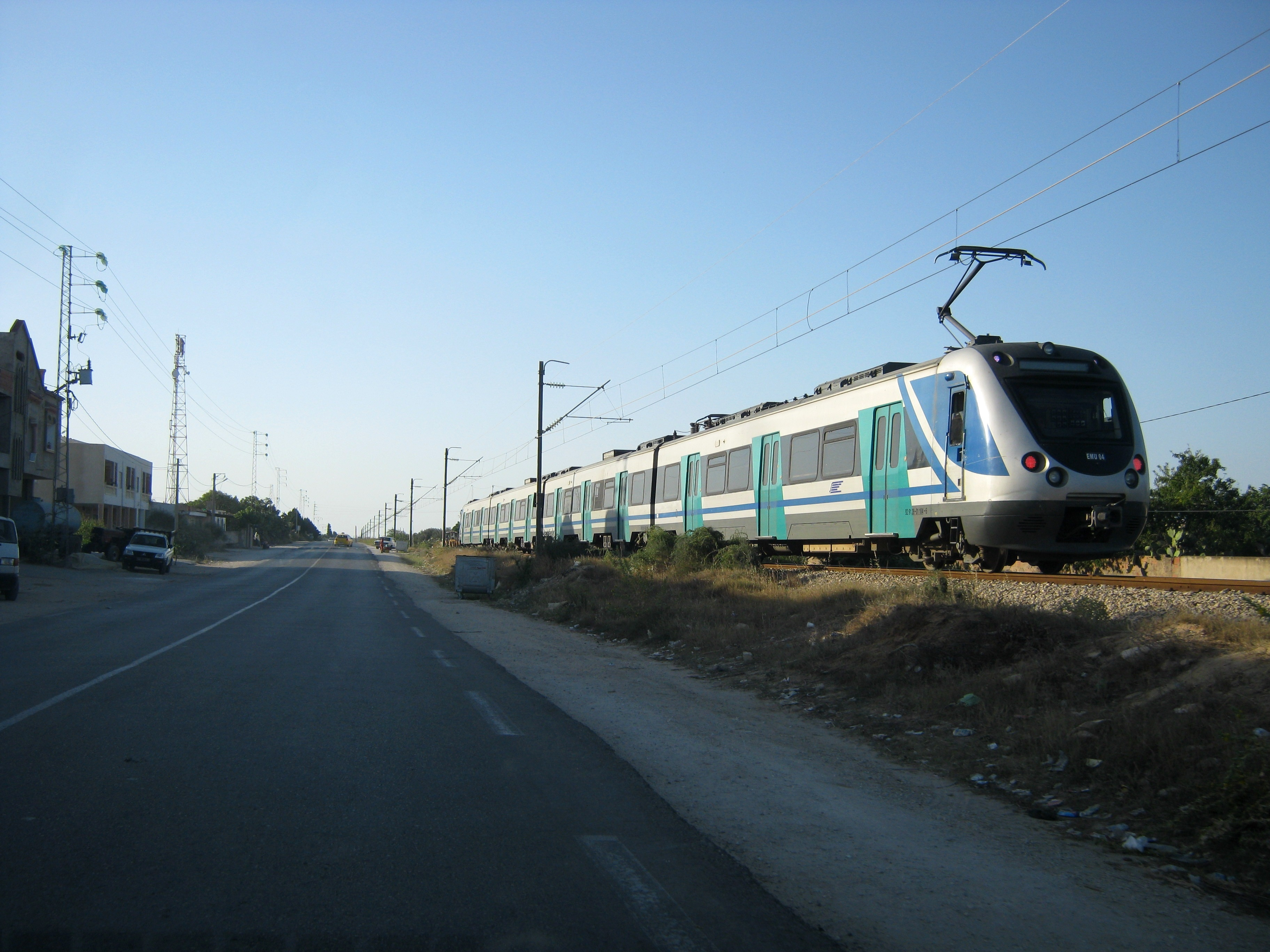
A metre gauge EMU similar to those of Line A, seen here on the Sahel Metro in 2014.

Line A is operated with 19 four-car metre-gauge EMUs supplied by the South Korean manufacturer Hyundai Rotem. Bought under a contract signed in December 2007, the trains feature a design that is identical to those used on the Sahel Metro. The trains were delivered from February to December 2010.

=== Lines D and E ===
As lines D and E are both standard-gauge, they both share rolling stock. The lines are both operated with 28 four-car EMUs, also supplied by Hyundai Rotem. The company was selected for the supply of the trains in October 2016, and the first trains were delivered in August 2019. All trains were delivered by 2023.

== Planned lines and extensions ==
=== Line C ===
Like Line A, Line C will be the result of the upgrade and electrification of an existing metre-gauge line. The line will run south from Tunis Central on the existing Djebel Jelloud-Kasserine mainline until Bir Kasaa, where it will turn east on a new alignment, terminating at Mohamdia.

=== Line D extension ===
An extension is currently under construction to extend Line D six kilometres north from its present terminus at Gobâa to Mnihla.

=== Line F ===
Line F will be an entirely new line running from Tunis Central north to Ariana, mostly running on the western shore of Lake Tunis.

== See also ==
- Transport in Tunisia
- Tunis Light Metro
