= Abi Mnigel Mosque =

Mosque in Tunis, Tunisia

Mosque
- جامع أبي منيجل
- Location within Tunisia

Religion
- Affiliation: Islam
- Branch/tradition: Sunni

Location
- Location: Tunis, Tunisia
- Coordinates: 36.805961°N 10.165065°E

Architecture
- Type: Mosque

Abi Mnigel Mosque (Arabic: جامع أبي منيجل) is a small mosque in the north of the Medina of Tunis, near the Bab Souika suburb.

== Localization ==
It is located in 16 El Nfefta Street.

== Etymology ==
According to the historian Mohamed Belkhodja, the mosque's name has two possible origins: A not well-known saint called Abi Mnigel, or the Abi Mnigel Bird (Tayr Al Ababil), a sacred bird mentioned in the coran.

== History ==
According to the commemorative plaque at the entrance, it was built in the 13th century. it's known for its minbar that was made in 1493 and where the chahada is engraved. The mosque was restored between 1963 and 1966.
