= Mellassine =

Suburb of Tunis, Tunisia

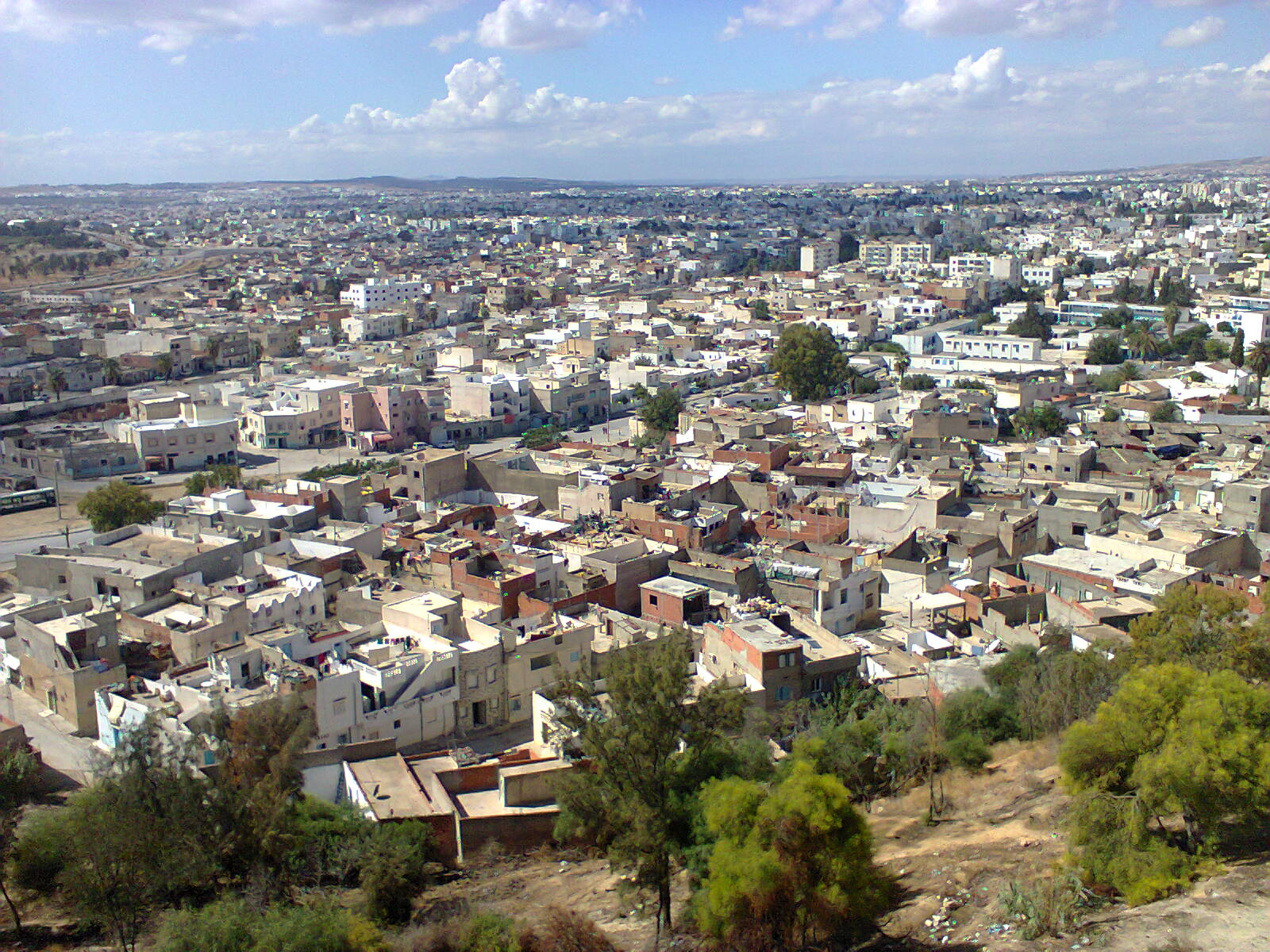
Panoramic view of El Mellassine

Mellassine (Arabic: الملاسين) is a popular residential suburb in the west of the capital Tunis, Tunisia. It is administrated by the Sijoumi Delegation, Tunis Governorate.

== Strategical Place ==
It is proximate to many well-known places, such as 9 April 1938 Boulevard, the Medina of Tunis, Charles-Nicolle Hospital, La Rabta Hospital, the Faculty of Medicine of Tunis, Sabkhet Sijoumi and the city of Le Bardo. It hosts Sijoumi Preparatory School as well for pupils from 7th to 9th primary years and is an exit to the route that connects the west of Tunis, thus the A3 Autoroute to the south of Tunis, thus the A1 Autoroute.

== Transportation ==
Access to this suburb is can be done via:

- Taxi
- Bus by Transtu
- Collective Taxi with sign number 32
- Collective Taxi with sign “Charles Nicole” where it stops
- Train Line E (Gare de Tunis–Bougatfa) at Ennajeh Station, stopping in Ennajeh Neighbourhood
- Train Line D (Gare de Tunis–Goubaa), stopping in the centre of Mellasine

== Challenges ==
The Mellassine suburb experiences a tarnished reputation, for issues like poverty, unemployment, crimes and the spread of drugs. People who do not reside there are usually warned to avoid going there or to proximate places due to petty crimes and riots. Several victims reported being mugged, pickpocketed, strangers trying to approach them and children throwing stones at people and cars. The local residents of Mellassine complain that the government neglects them, and especially neglects the poor neighbourhoods.

Efforts by the local residents of Tunis, whether they live in Mellassine or not, are being done to challenge these stereotypes and help Mellassine evolve to be a better place.
