= Bab Alioua =

Gate in Tunis, Tunisia

- Arabic: باب عليوة
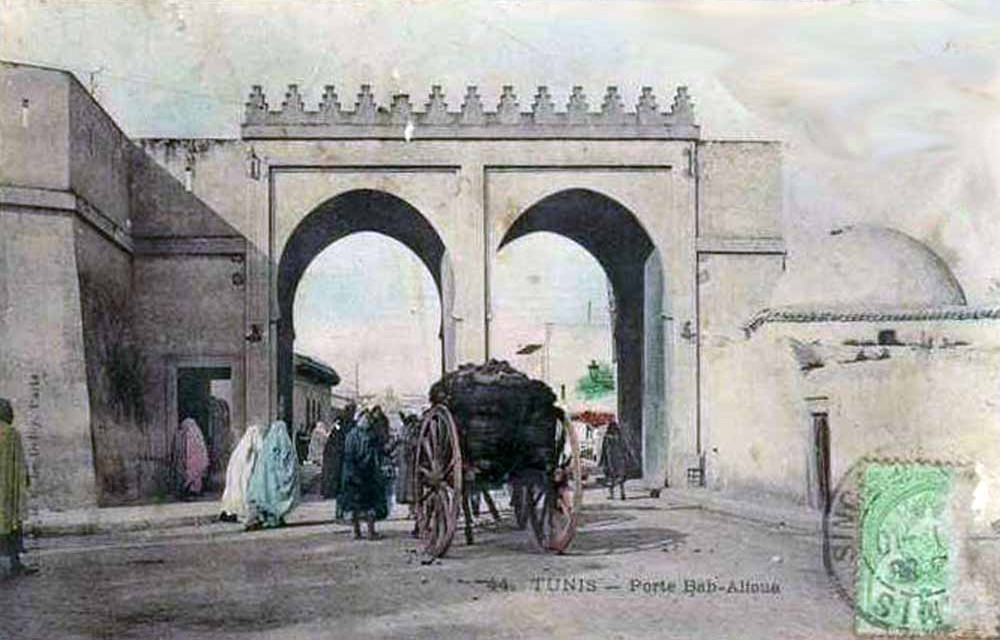
- Bab Alioua in 1900
- Etymology: "Gate of the small story", for a nearby one-story building

General information
- Town or city: Tunis
- Country: Tunisia
- Coordinates: 36.79011°N 10.17992°E

Bab Alioua (Arabic: باب عليوة) is one of the gates of the medina of Tunis, the capital of Tunisia.

Bab Alioua, which translates as the "Gate of the Small Story", was built by the sultan hafside Abū lshâq Ibrâhîm al-Mustansir (1349–1369) at the eastern edge of the ramparts of the medina. It takes its name from a small building near the gate that served as a lookout post. It was through this door that Hayreddin Barbarossa entered Tunis in 1534.
