= Place de Barcelone (Tunis) =

Urban square in Tunis

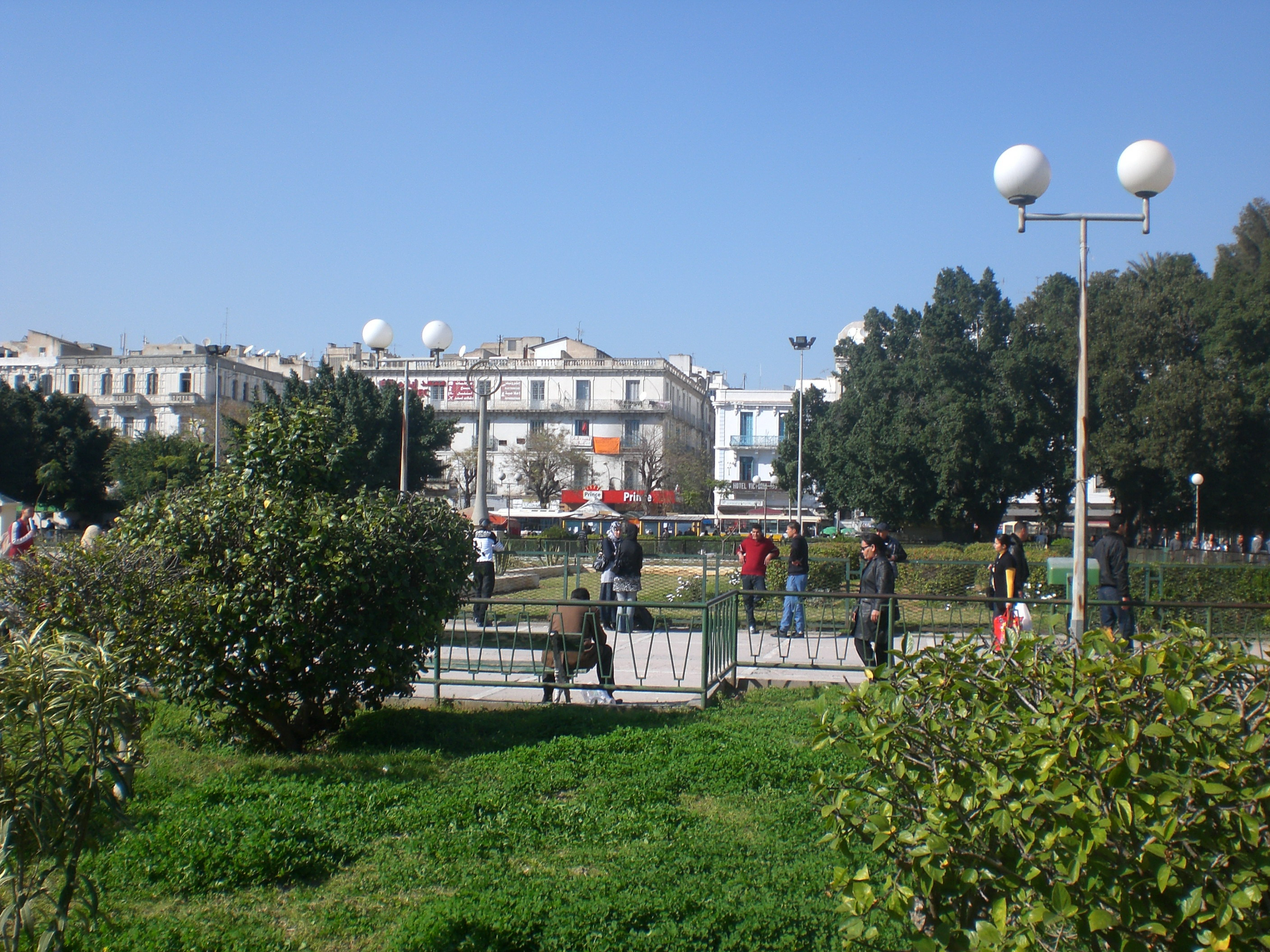
View of Barcelona square

Place de Barcelone (Barcelona square or Barcelona place) is a square in the center Tunis, capital of Tunisia.

== Location ==
The square is surrounded by the streets of Belgium (rue de Belgique) and Ali-Darghouth. The streets that converge towards the square are the streets of Holland (rue de Holland), Koufa, Greece (rue de Grèce), Ali-Darghouth, England (rue d'Angleterre), Spain (rue d'Espagne), as well as Avenue Farhat-Hached. It is not far from the embassies of France in Tunisia, Italy and Place Mongi-Bali.

== Transport ==
It is home to an important urban transport hub, with the Tunis light metro, many bus lines, the Gare de Tunis managed by the Tunisian National Railway Company and a public garden. In 2011 it was the place of several demonstrations.

In 2008 the central director of major projects of the Société des transports de Tunis (Transtu) announced that it would launch a redevelopment project with a total value of 27.3 million dinars. He must create an underground bus station, the whole of the place then being dedicated to the metro; an improvement in traffic in the neighboring streets and avenues is also expected.

== Gallery ==
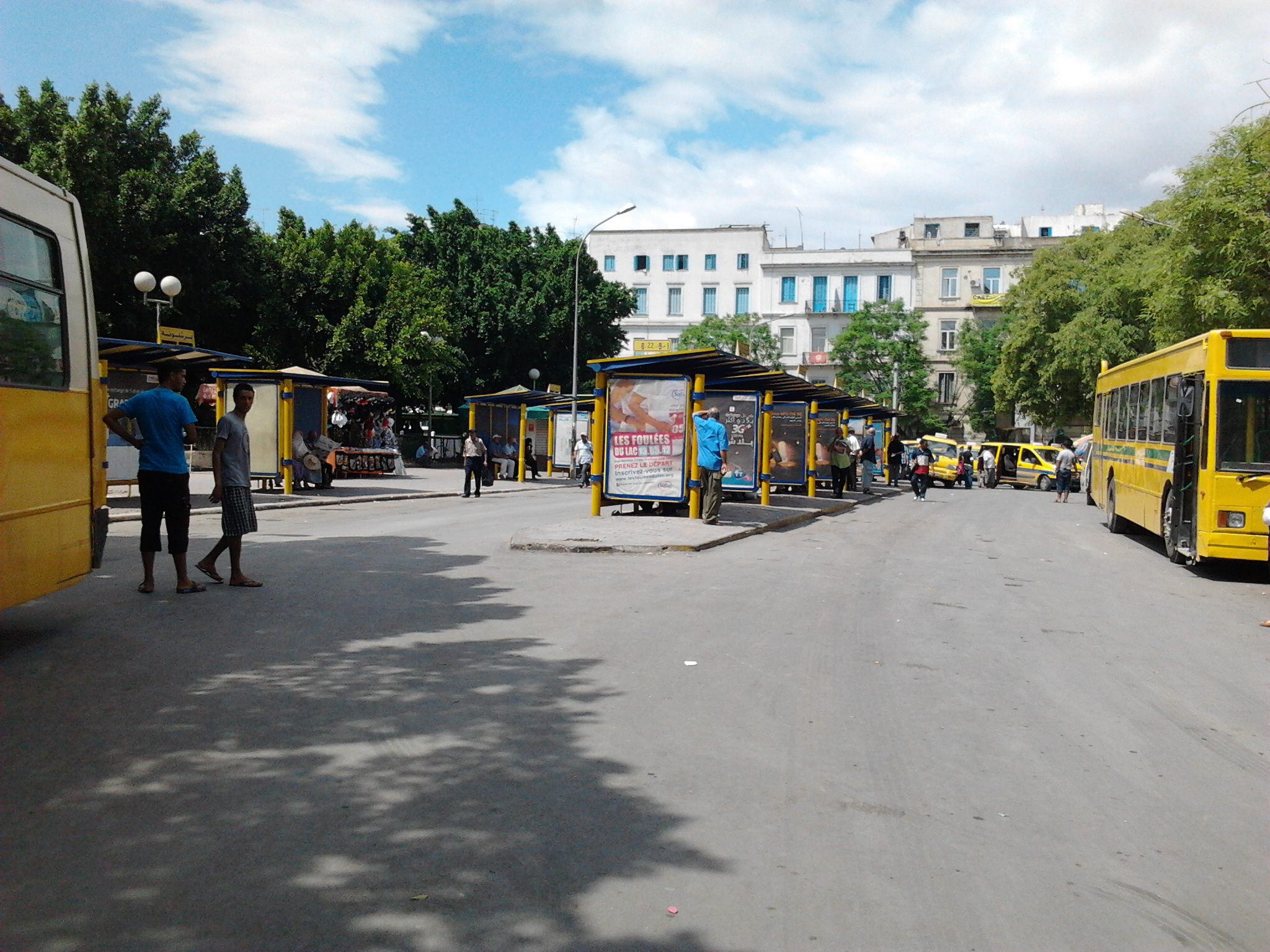
Bus station and vehicles belonging to the Transtu

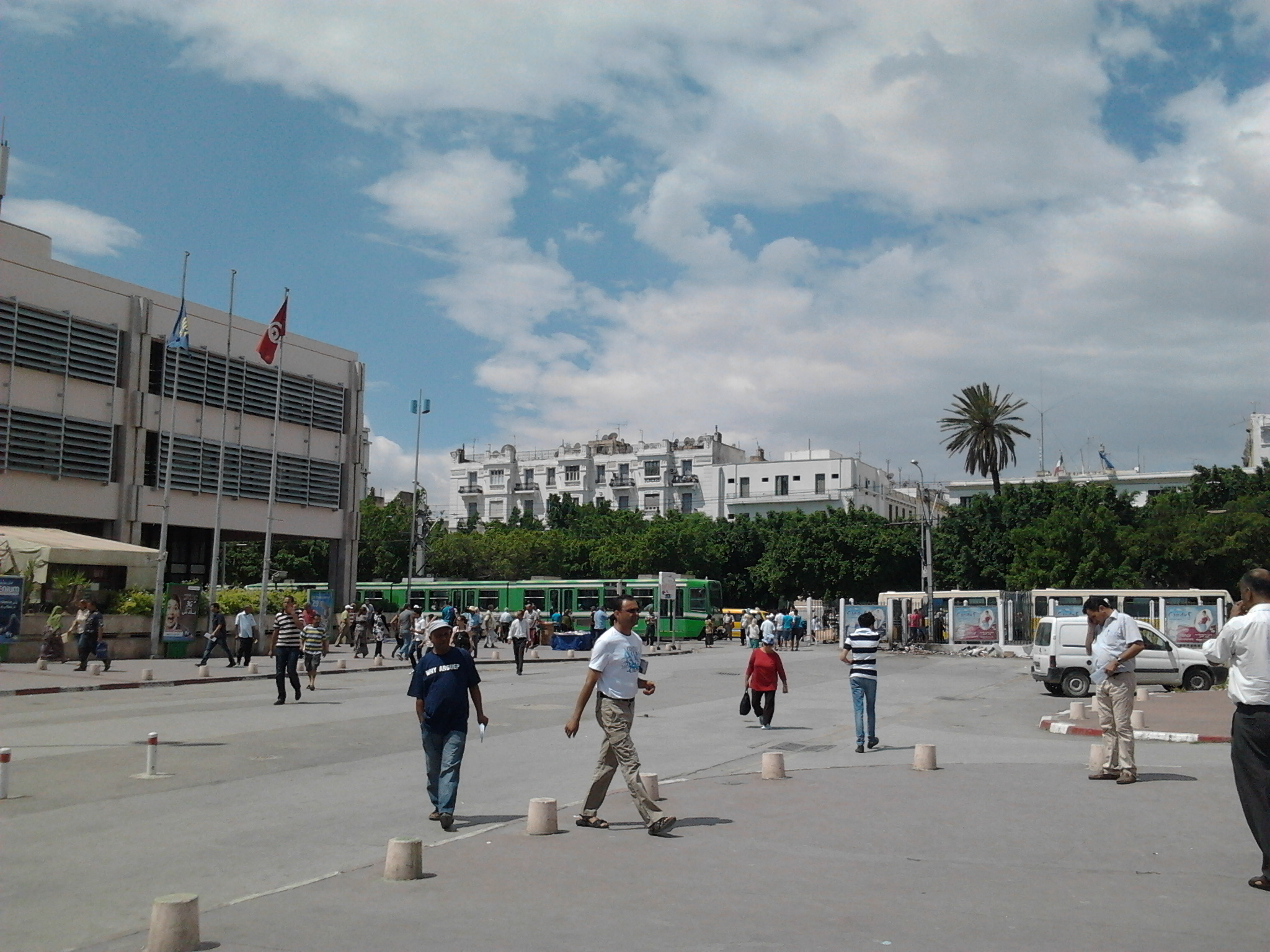
Station car park with Mongi-Bali square in the background

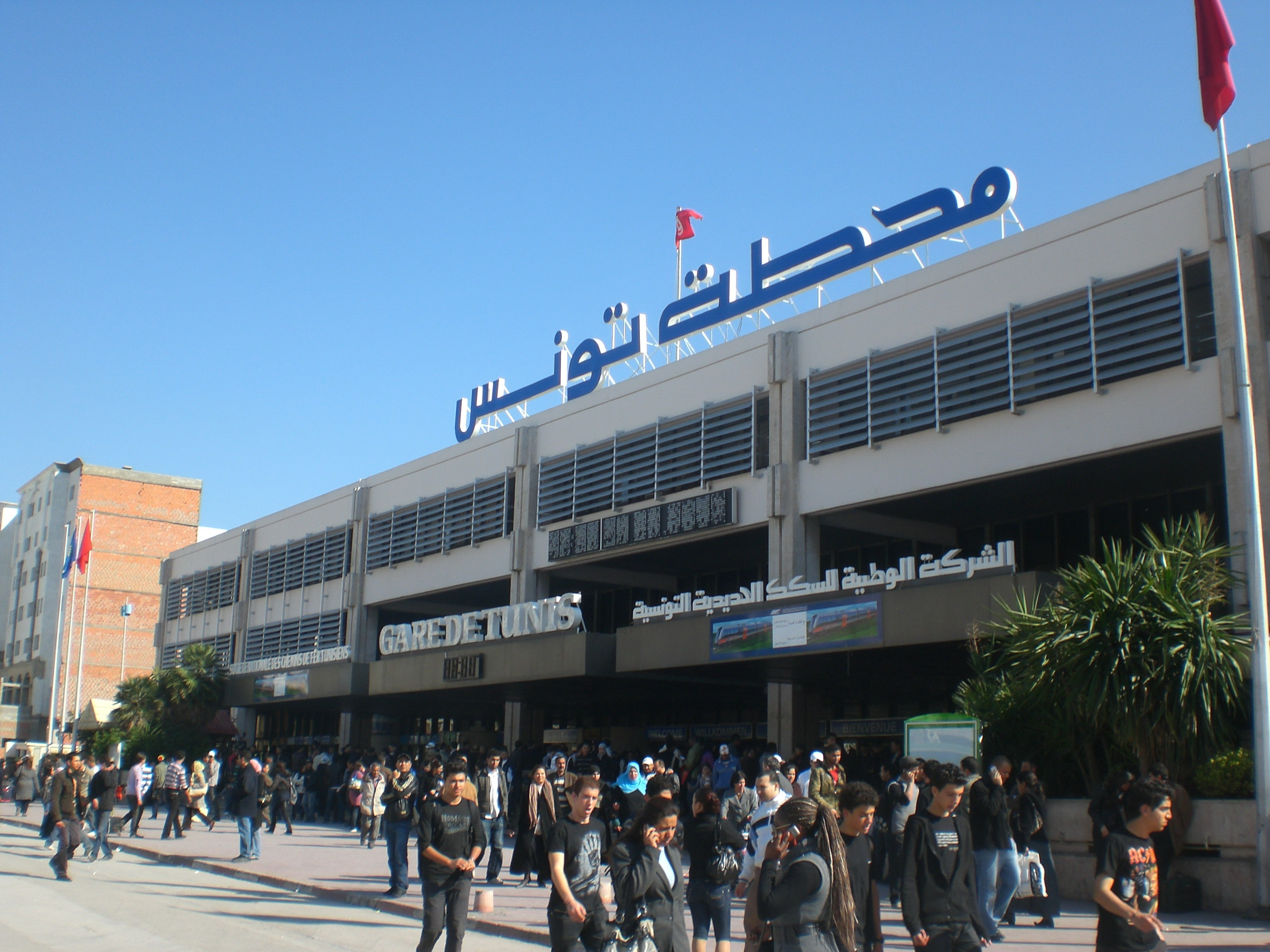
facade of the station

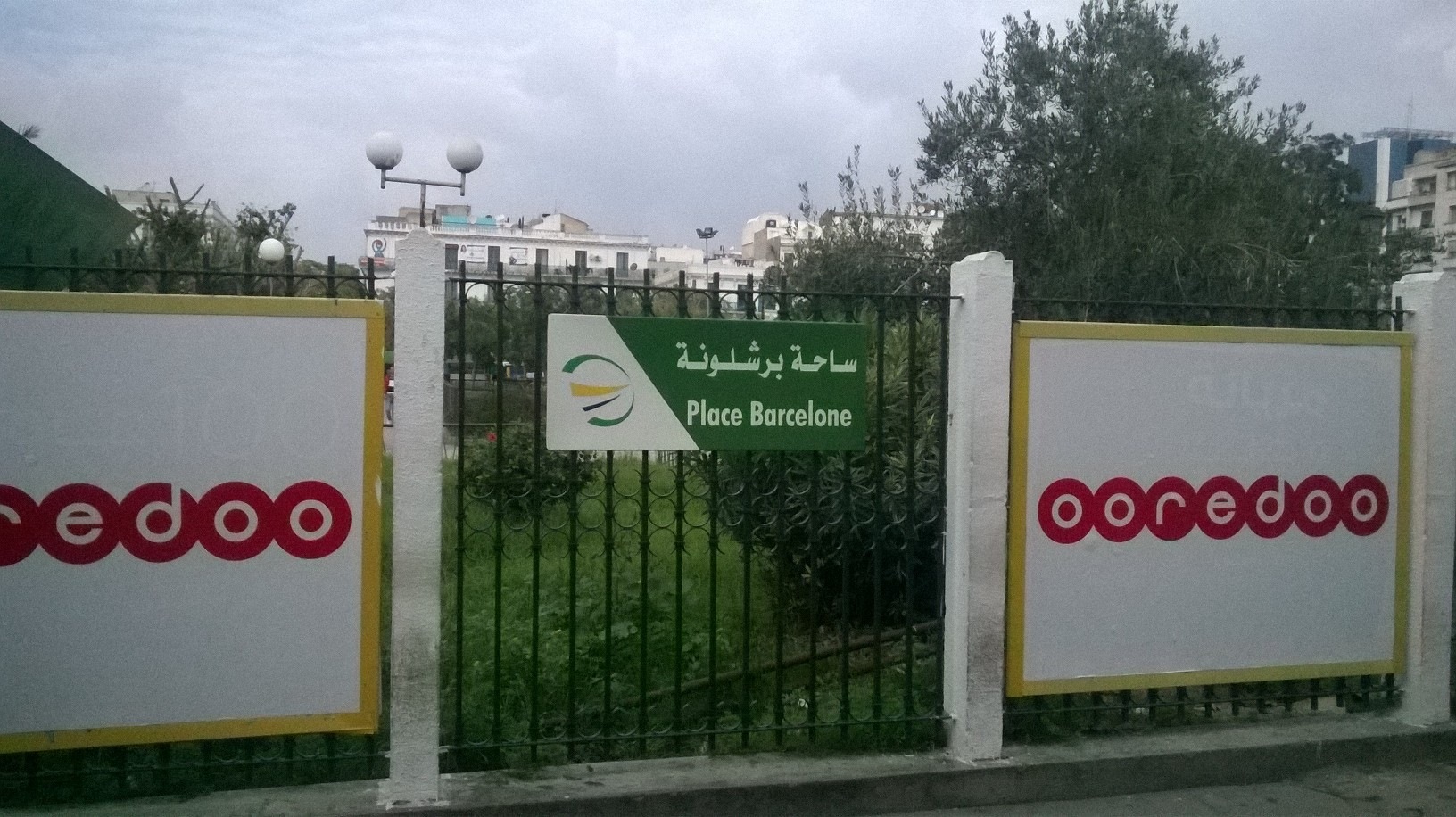
Plate indicating the metro station: Barcelona square

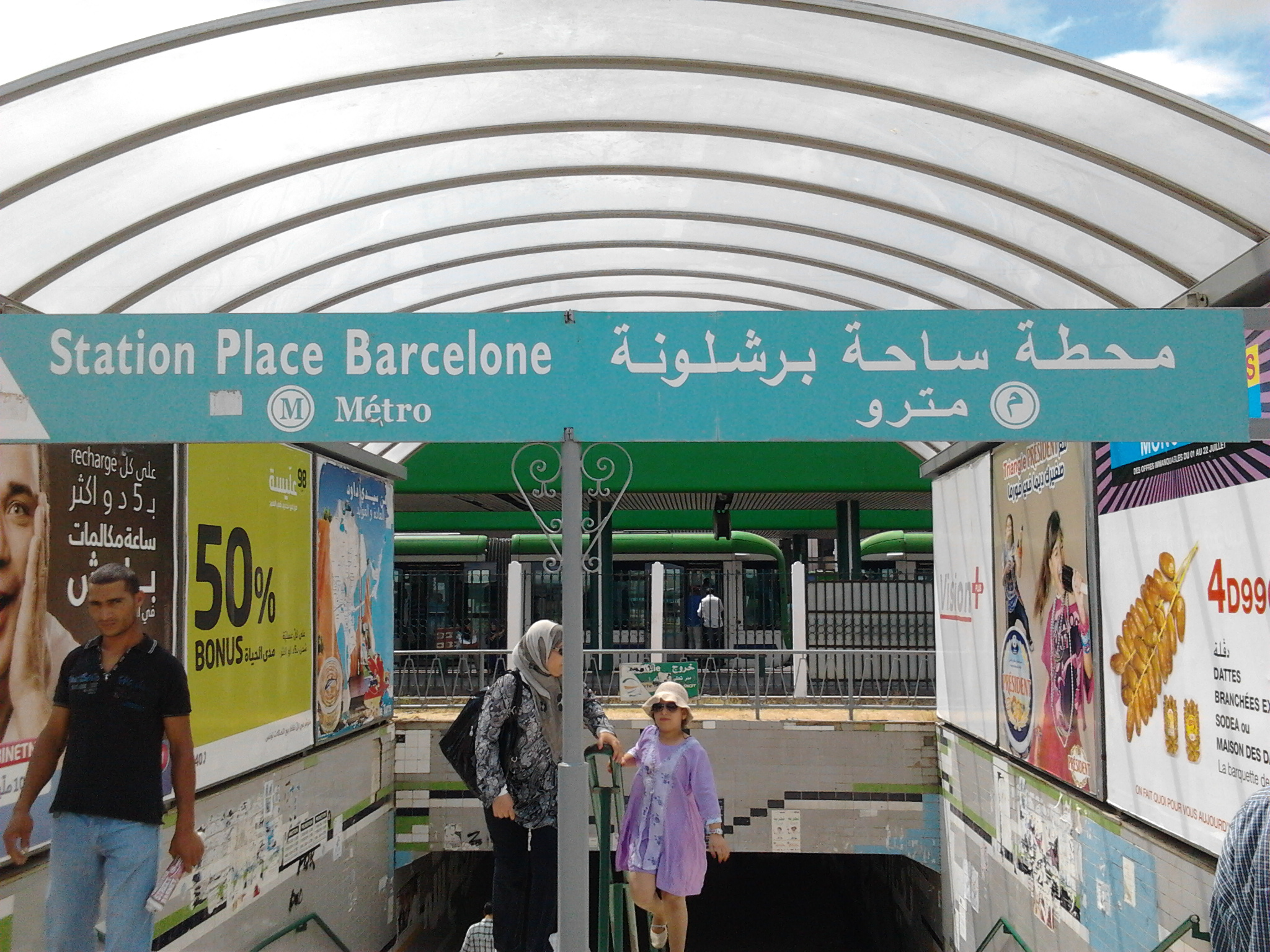
Entrance to the metro station

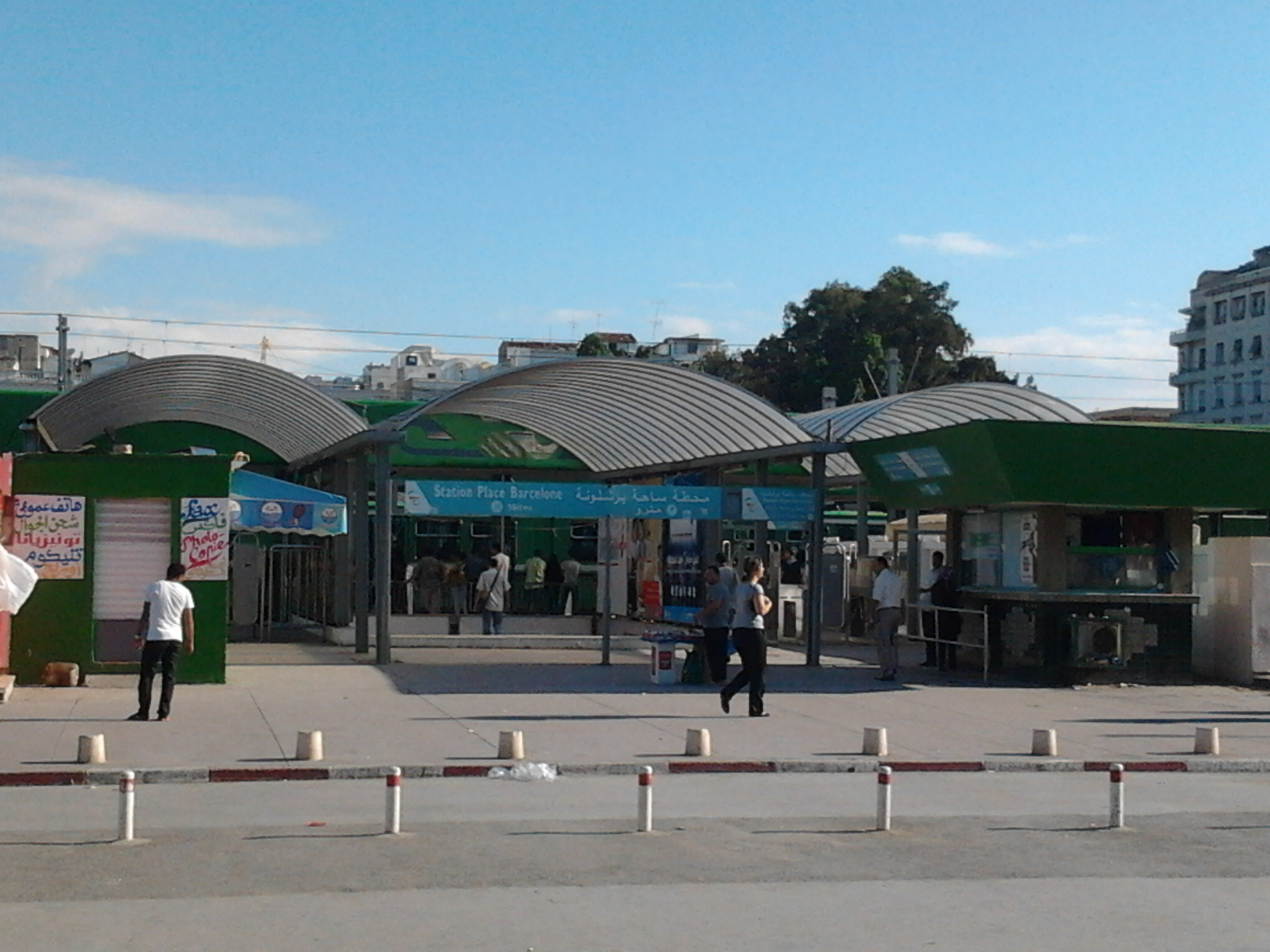
Metro station

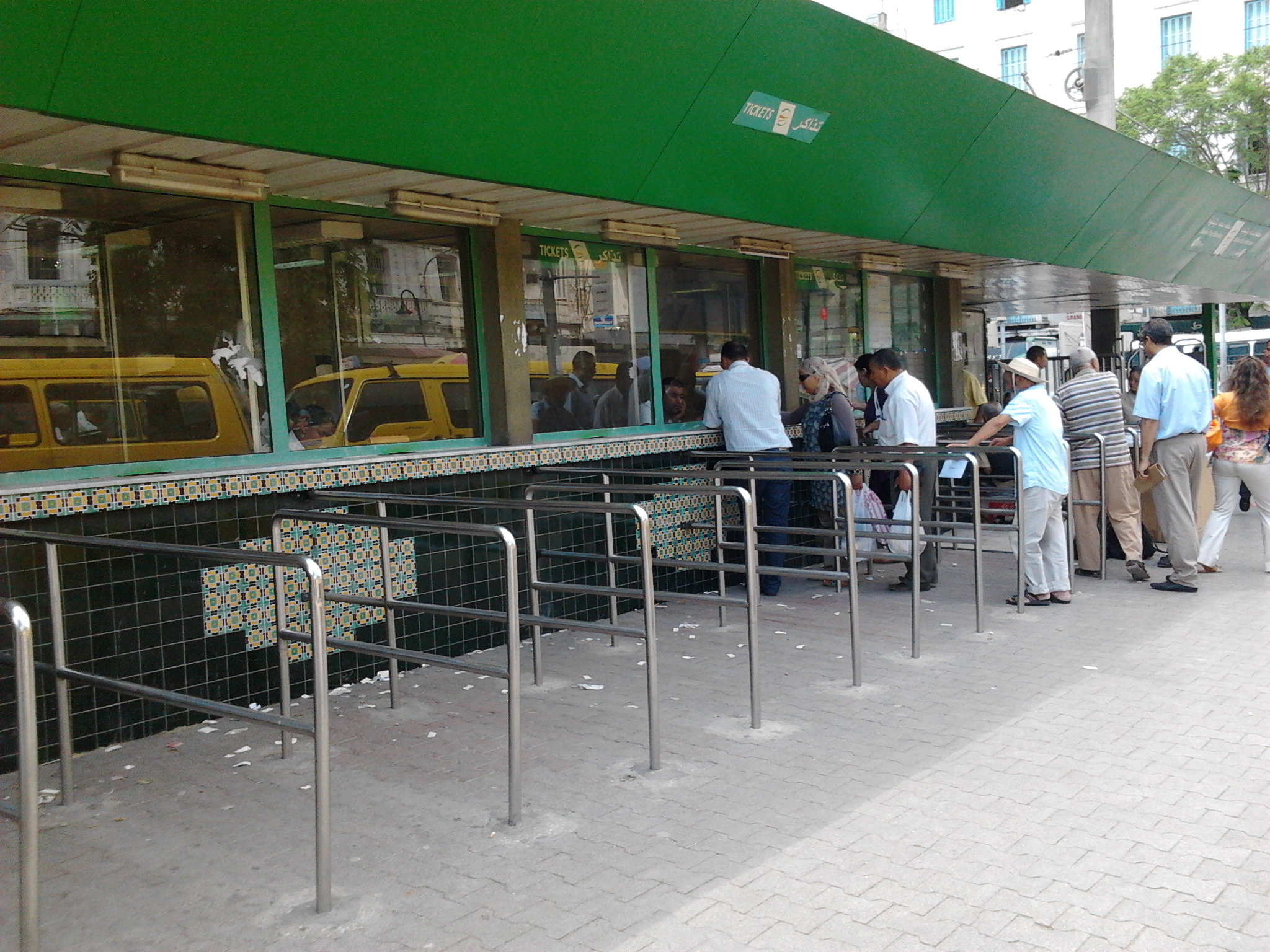
Counters of the metro

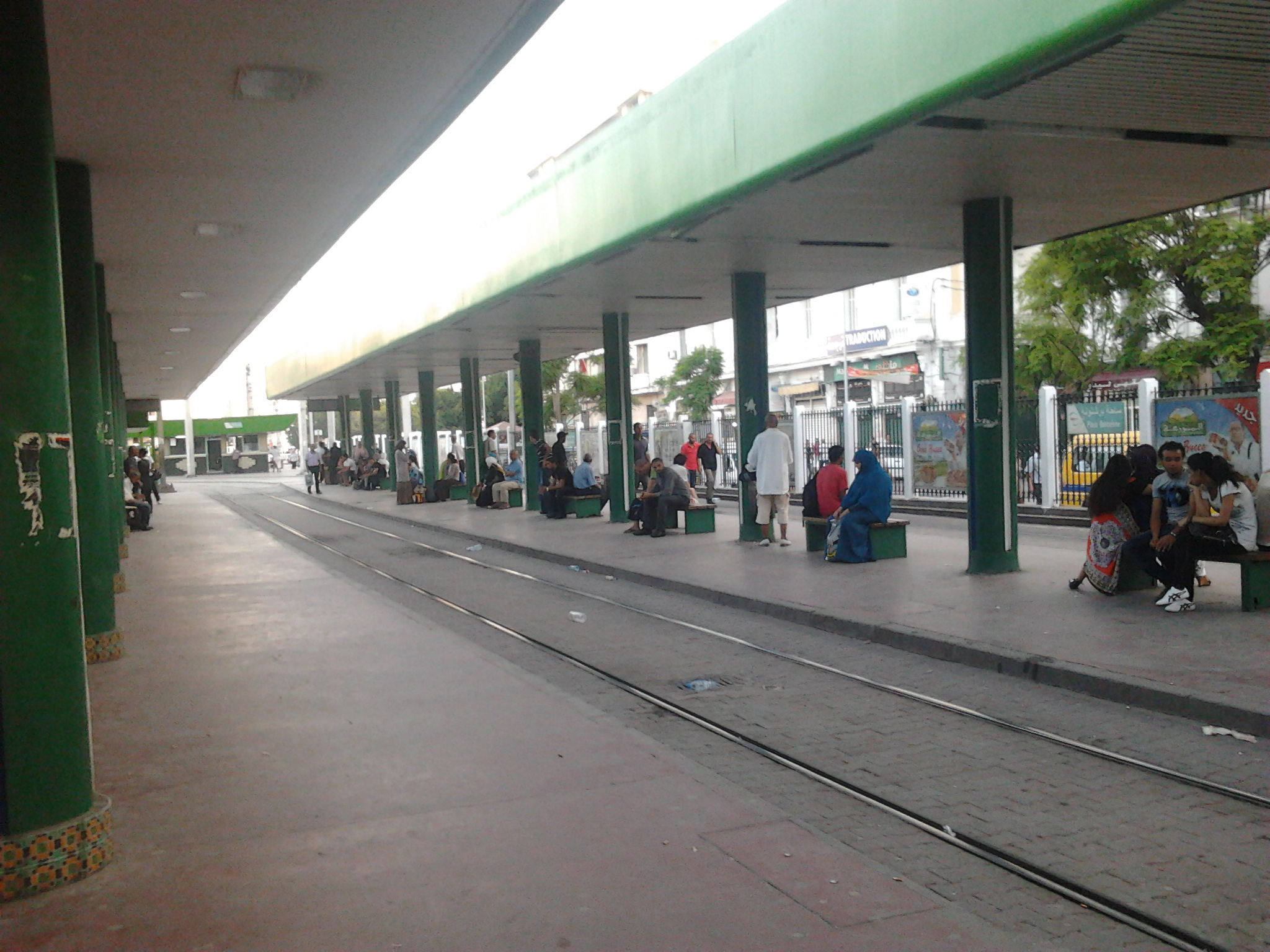
One of the two platforms of the metro station
