= Bab el Bhar =

- Arabic: باب البحر
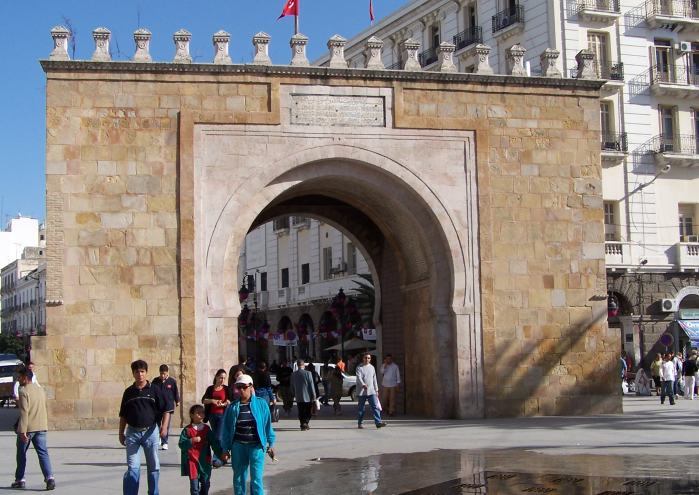
- The gate in 2005
- Interactive map of the Bab el Bhar area
- Alternative names: Porte De France
- Etymology: connected the medina to the Lake of Tunis harbor and the Gulf of Tunis

General information
- Type: City gate
- Location: Place Beb Bhar, Tunis, Tunisia
- Coordinates: 36.799165°N 10.175618°E

Bab el Bhar (Arabic: باب البحر, gate of the sea), also known as Porte De France (the gate of France), is a gate on the east side of the medina of Tunis, the capital of Tunisia. It marks the separation between the medina and the modern city.

The gate has undergone many alterations over its lifespan; its current form is an archway topped by a crenellated parapet.

== Gallery ==
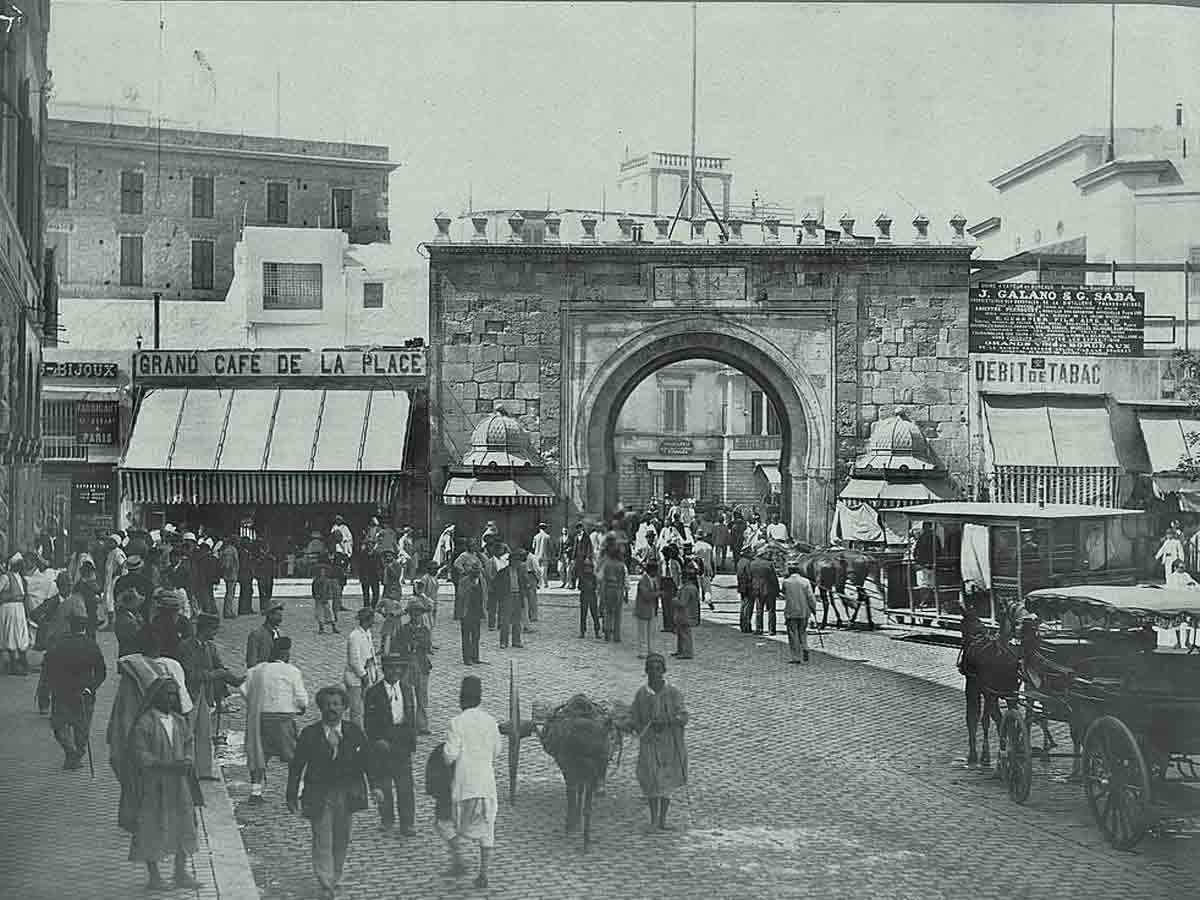
The gate surrounded by shops in 1895

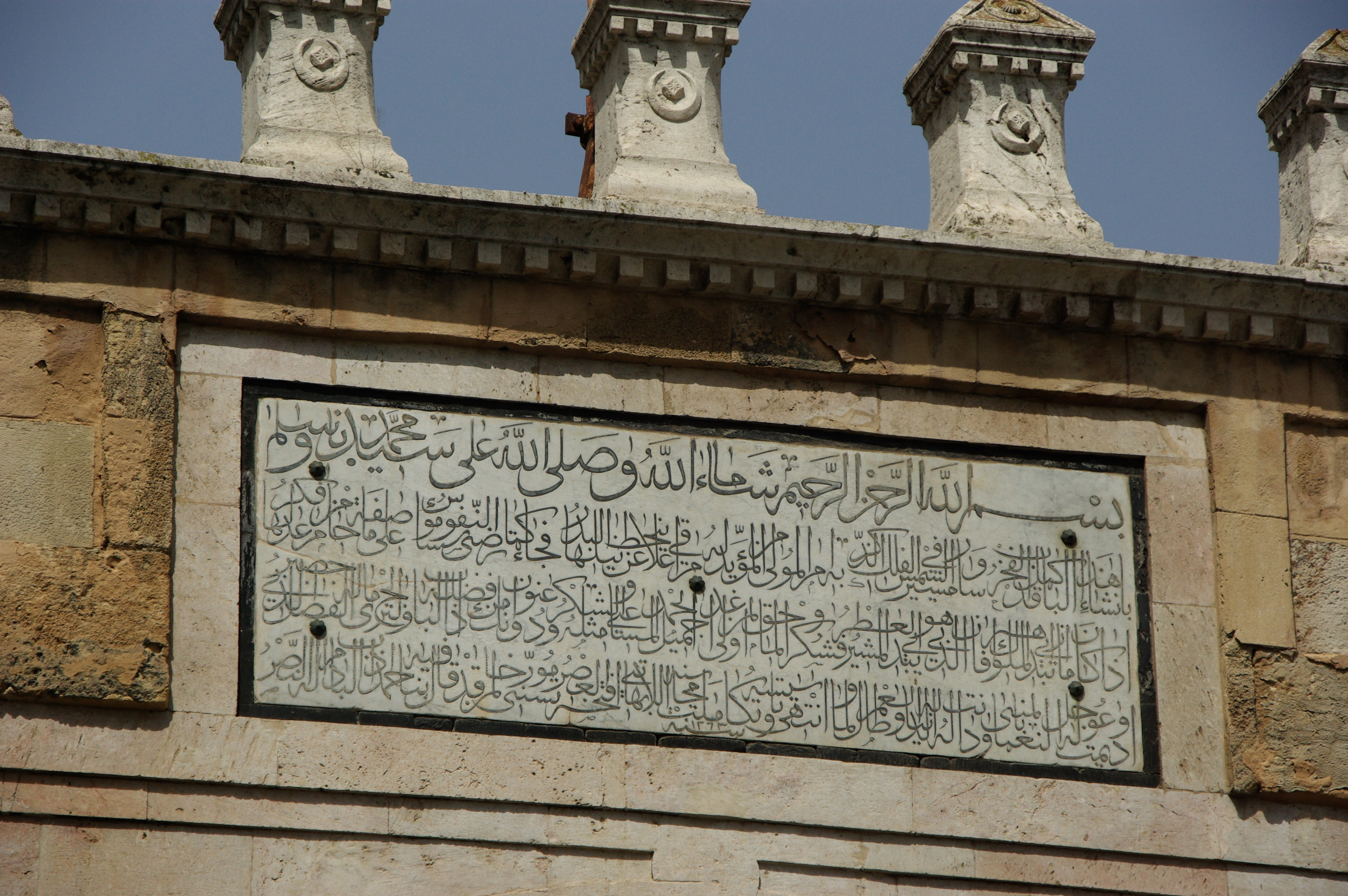
Details of the inscription on top of the door

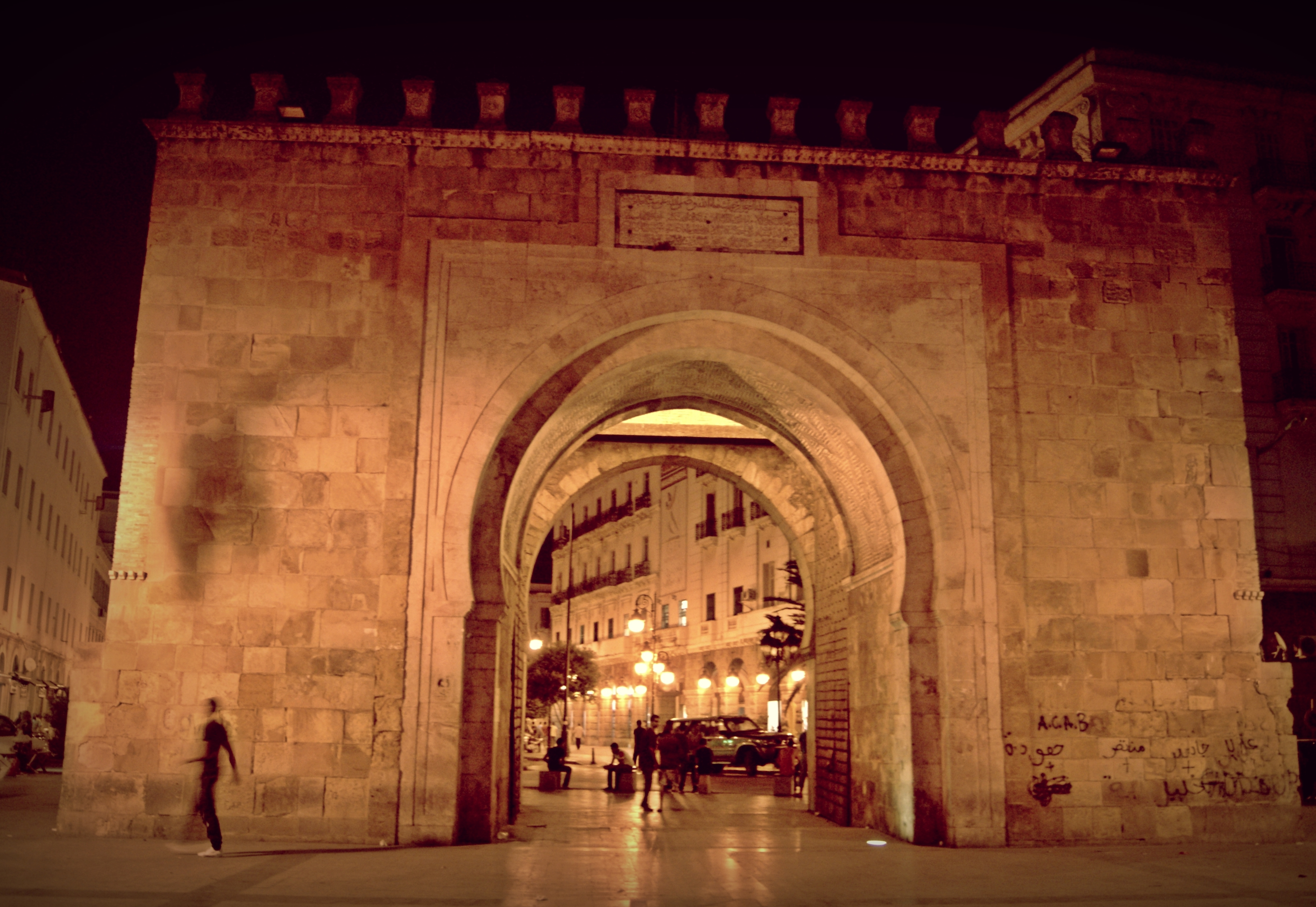
Night view
