= Bab Saadoun =

City gate in Tunis

- Arabic: باب سعدون
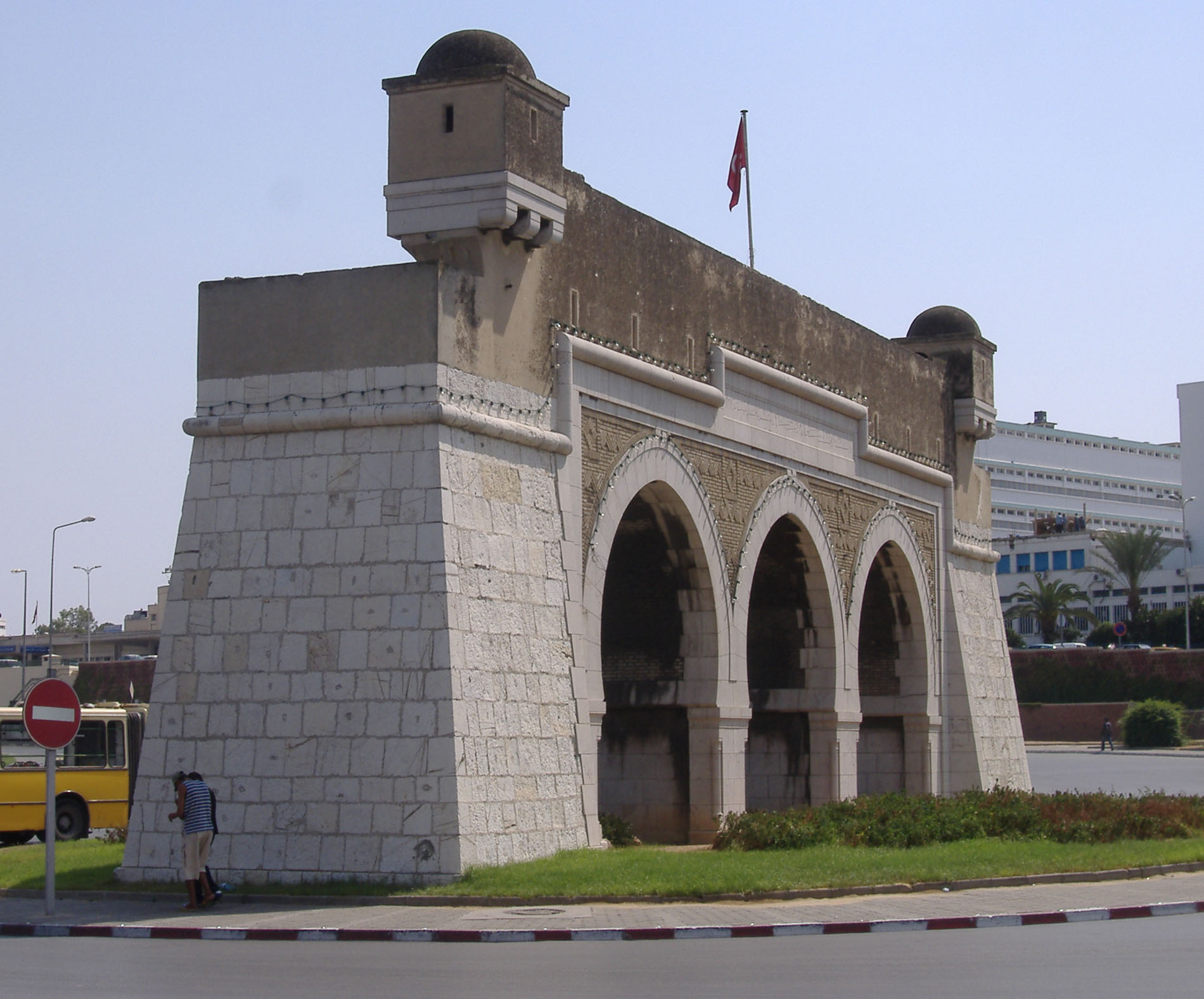
- View of Bab Saadoun in 2007
- Etymology: named for Sidi Bou Saadoun

General information
- Town or city: Tunis
- Country: Tunisia
- Coordinates: 36°48′31.25″N 10°9′32.50″E

Bab Saadoun (Arabic: باب سعدون) is one of the gates of the medina of Tunis, the capital of Tunisia.

== History ==
First constructed circa 1350 on the edge of the suburb of Bab Souika, it originally had only one narrow arch and it was replaced in 1881 (at the same time as the arch at Bab el Khadra) by a gate with three arches, better adapted to the volume of traffic coming from the routes to Béja, Bizerte and El Kef. It is named after a pious man, Sidi Bou Saadoun, who lived nearby in the 15th century.

== Gallery ==
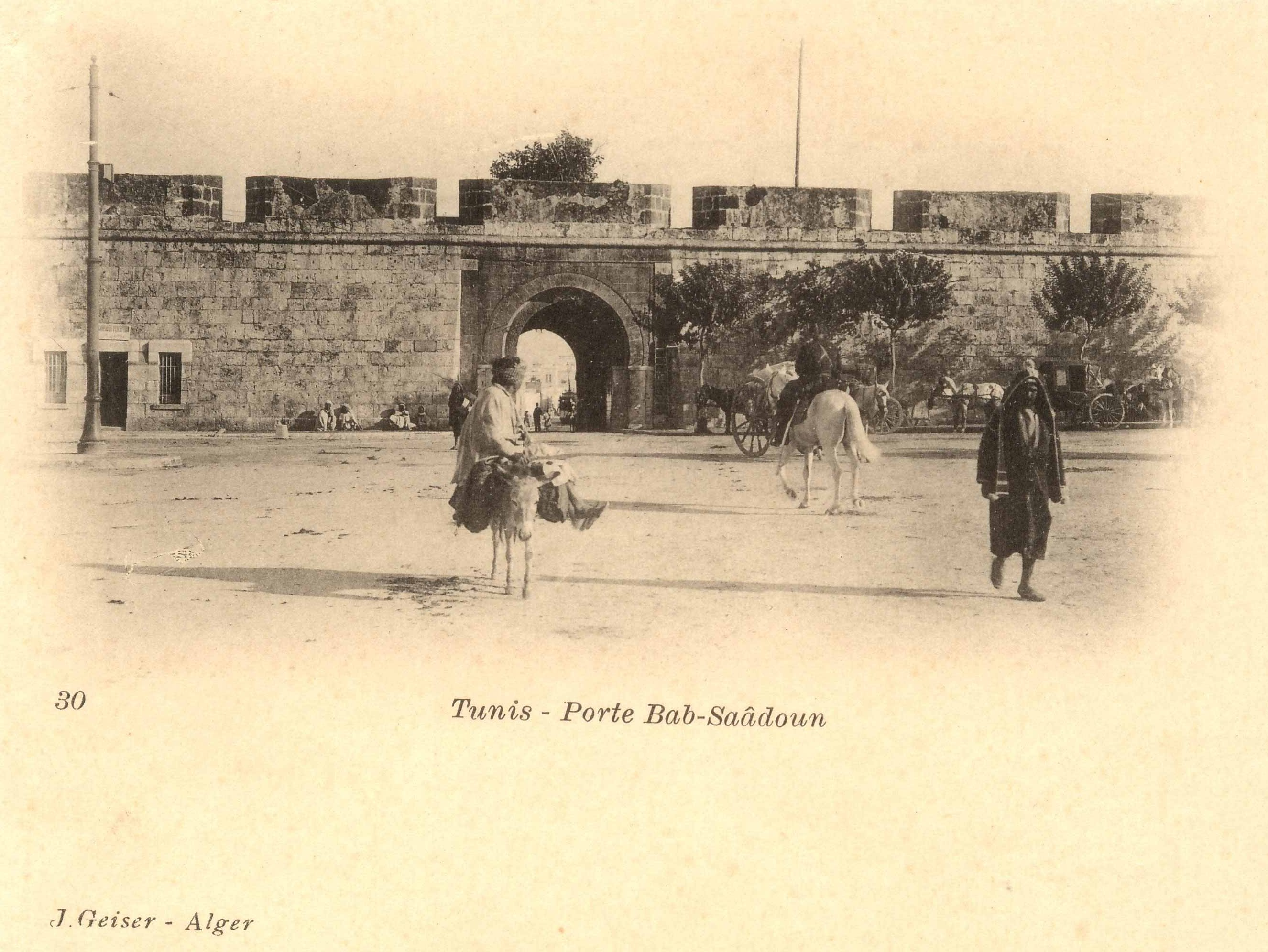
The original single-arch Bab Saadoun, photographed in 1880.

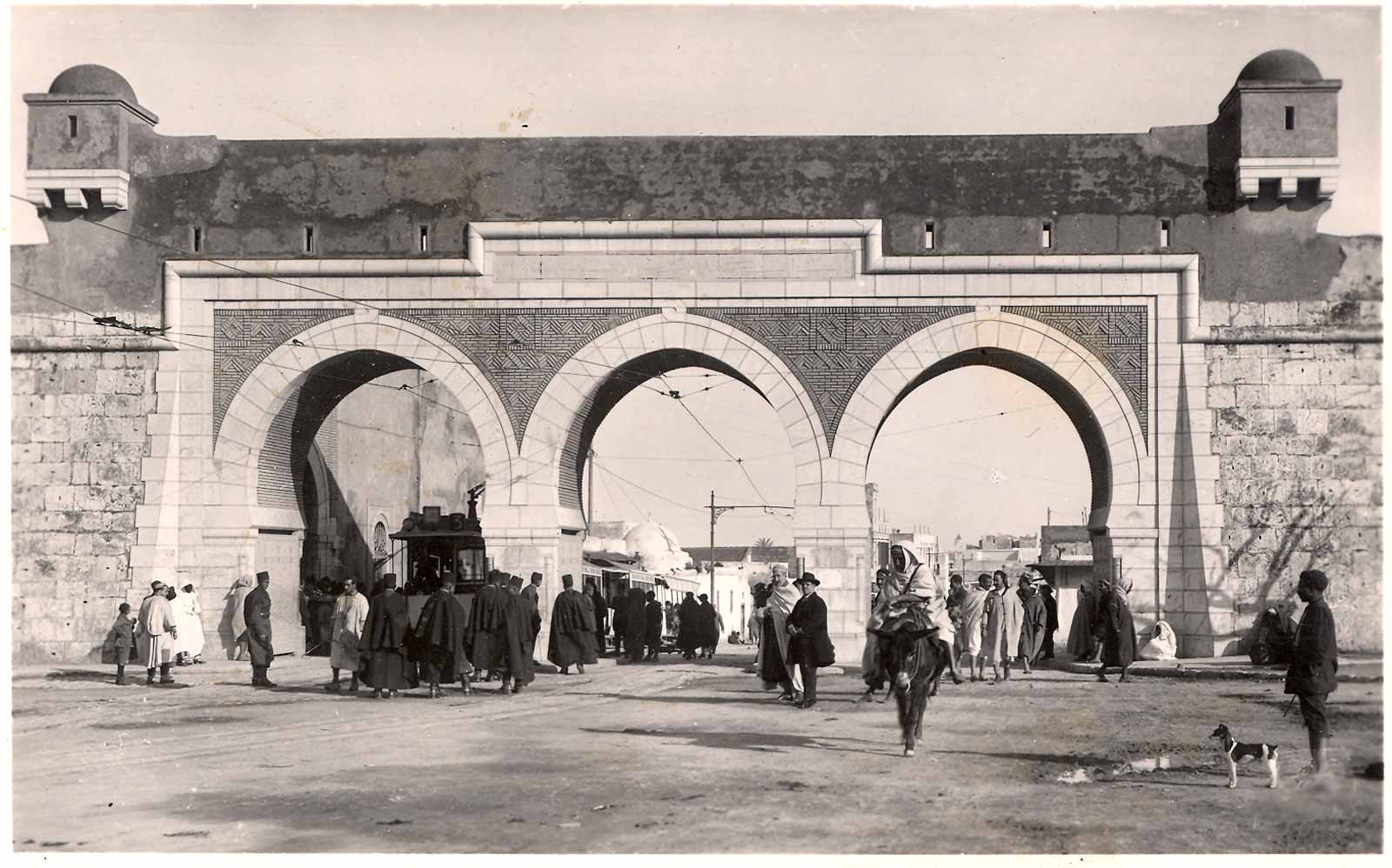
The new three-arch Bab Saadoun, photographed in 1940
