= Bab Souika =

- Arabic: باب سويقة
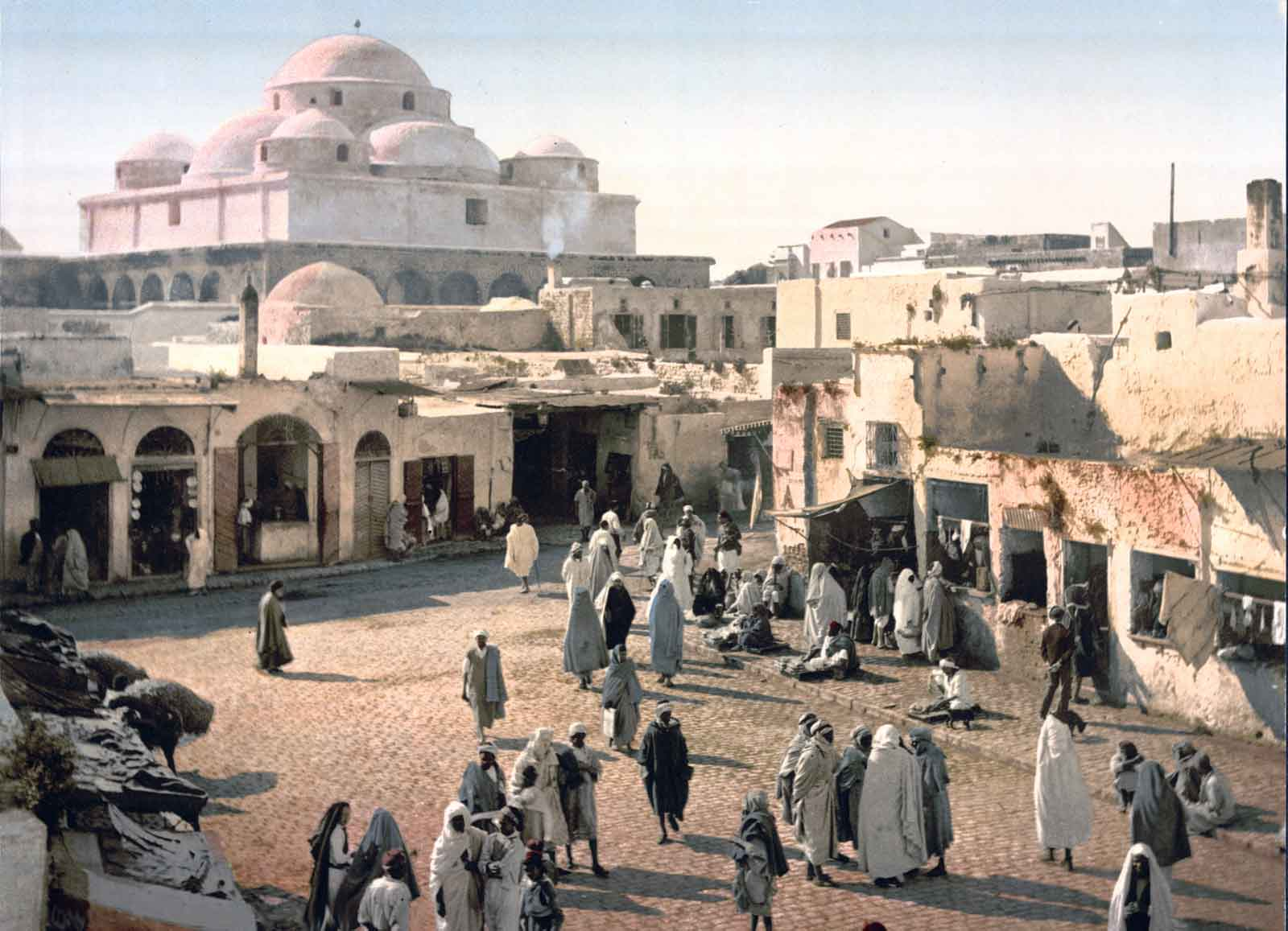
- Interactive map of the Bab Souika area

General information
- Coordinates: 36.805126°N 10.168221°E
- Demolished: 1861

Bab Souika (Arabic: باب سويقة) is one of the gates of the medina of Tunis.

Its location was between Bab El Khadra and Bab Saadoun, near the Halfaouine district and gave its name to the surrounding neighborhood. It functioned as a market gate and controlled the roads to Bizerte, El Kef, and Béja. It was demolished in 1861.

Bab Souika means "the gate of the small souk".
