= Tunis Gare Centrale =

Tunis Gare Centrale محطة تونس
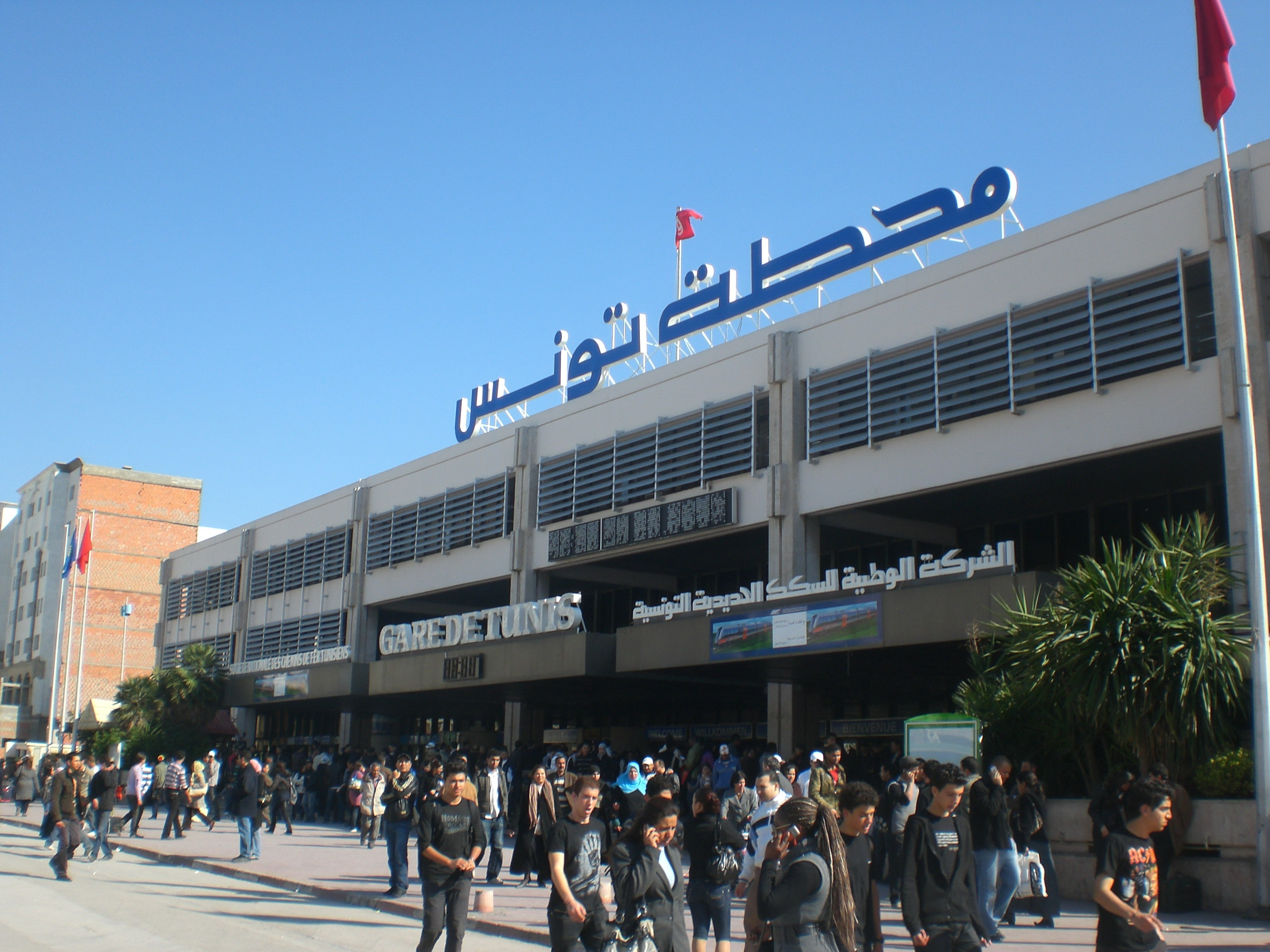
- The station in 2009

General information
- Other names: Gare de Tunis
- Location: place de Barcelone, Tunis; Tunisia
- Coordinates: 36.795244°N 10.180582°E
- Operator: Société Nationale des Chemins de Fer Tunisiens
Location

Tunis Gare Centrale (also known as Gare de Tunis) is the main railway station in Tunis, the capital and largest city of Tunisia. It is operated by the Société Nationale des Chemins de Fer Tunisiens.

It is the terminus station for the inter-city lines to Gabès and Ghardimaou, as well as for the Réseau Ferroviaire Rapide suburban rail network. Its location on Place de Barcelone allows for transfers to five light rail lines (1, 3, 4, 5 and 6).

The station was damaged in a fire during the revolution of 2011.

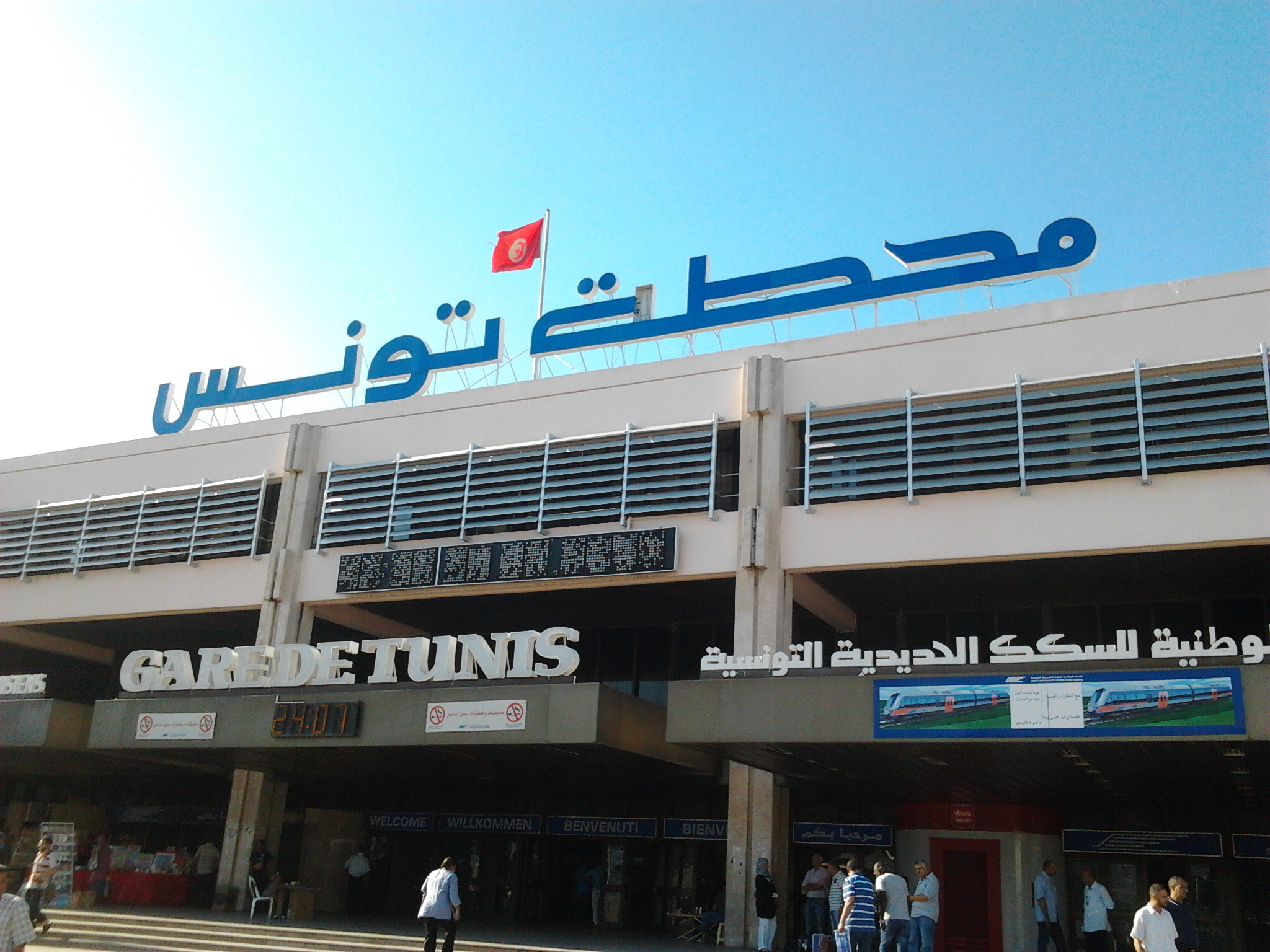

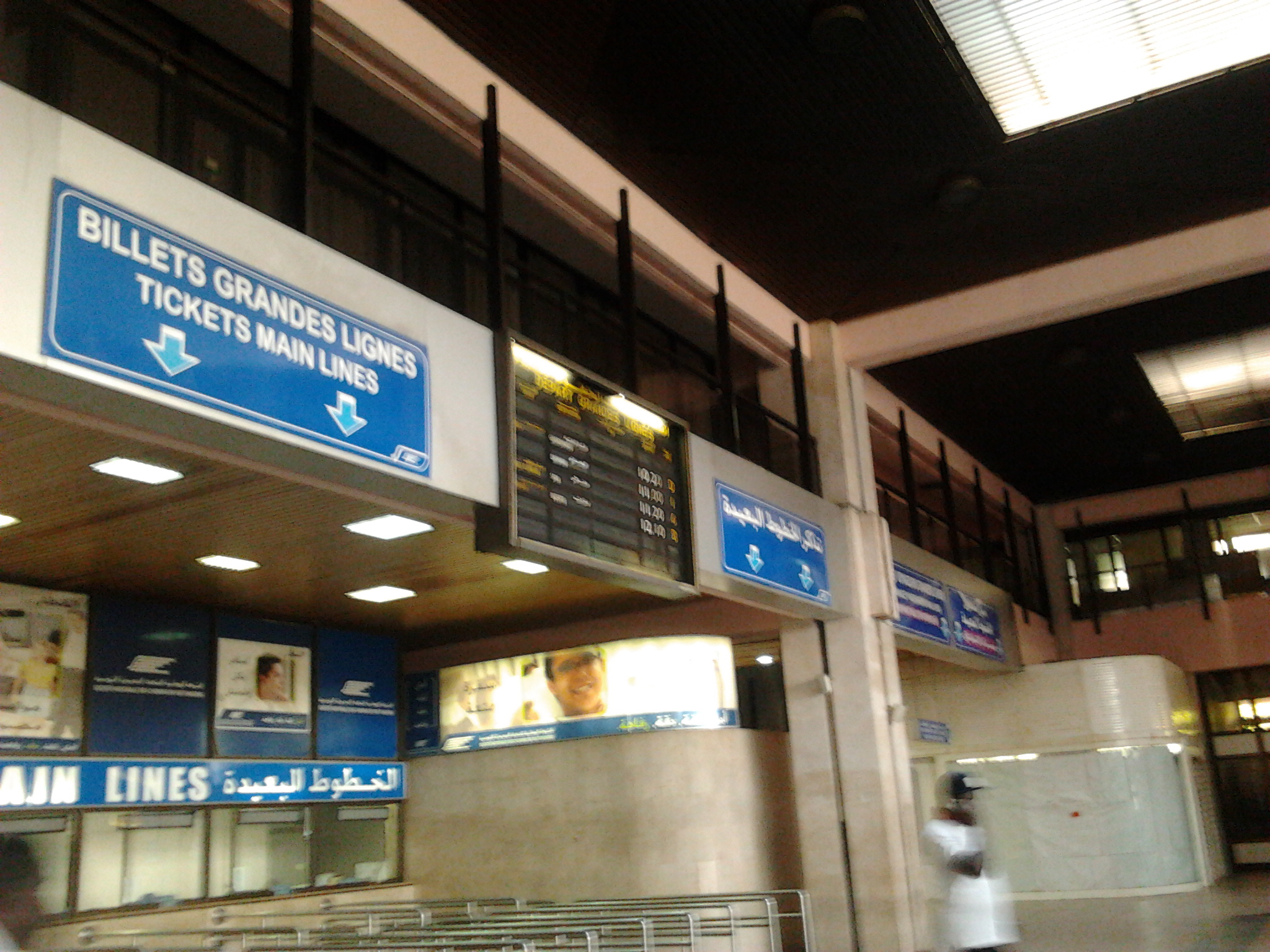

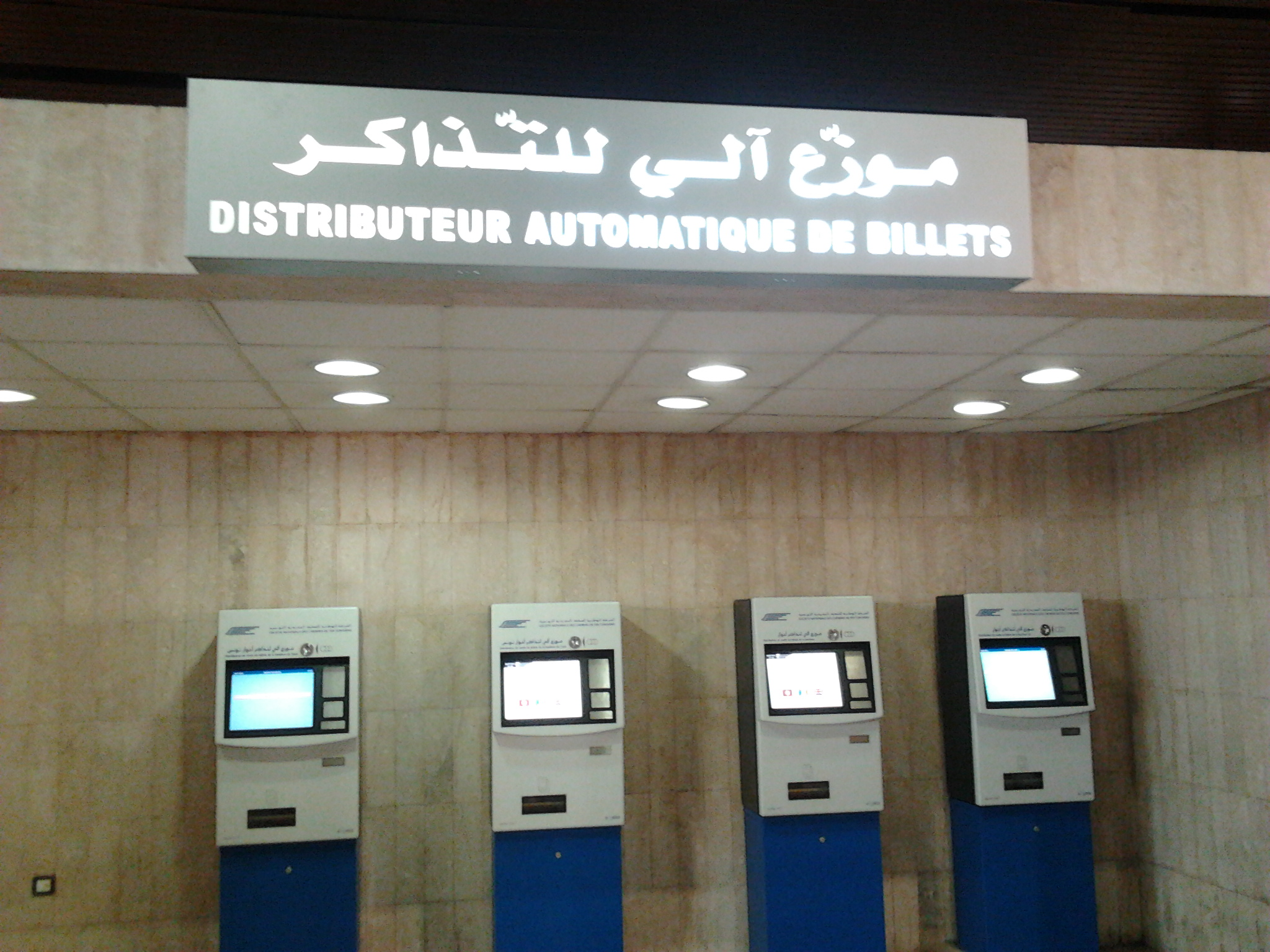

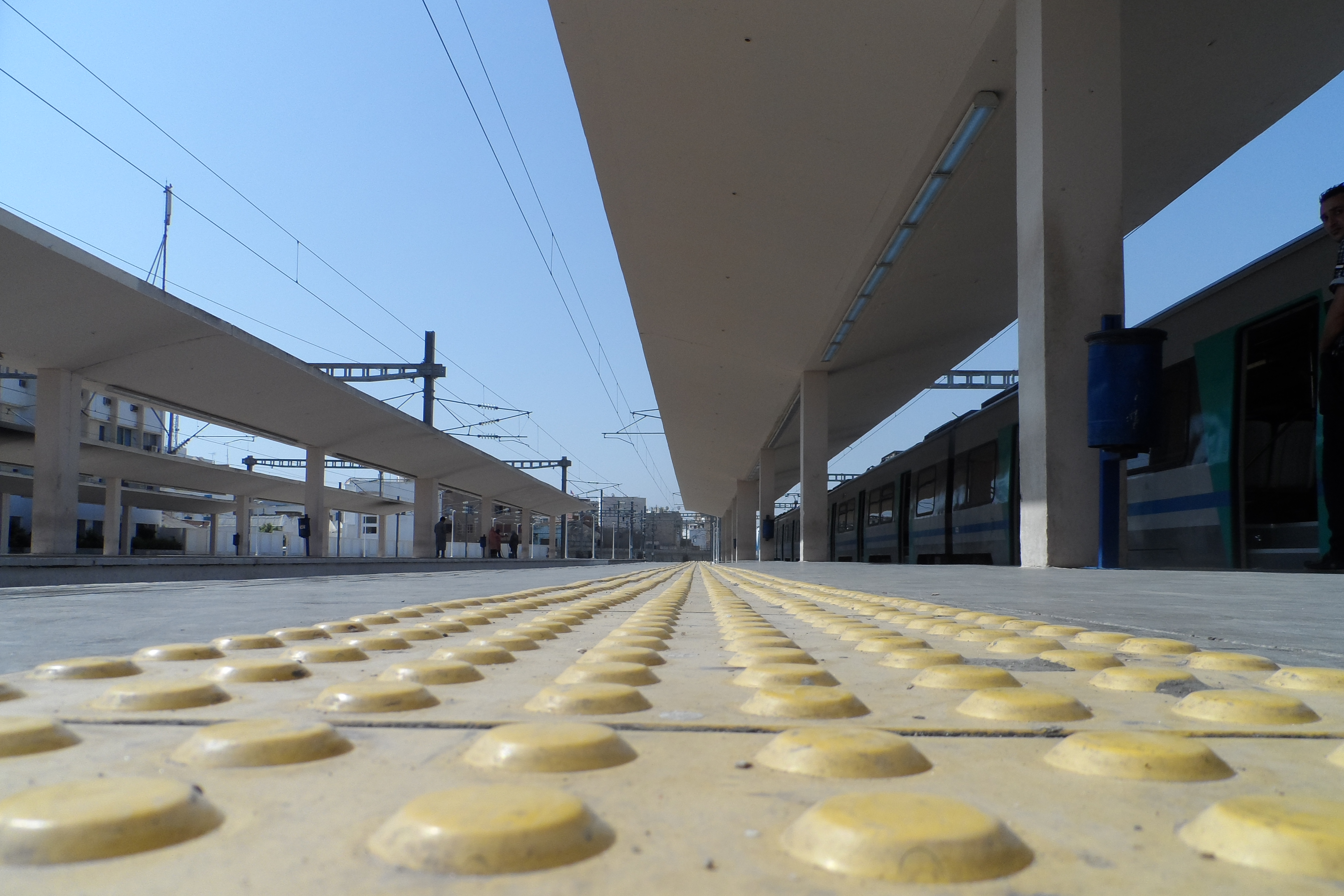
