= Manouba =

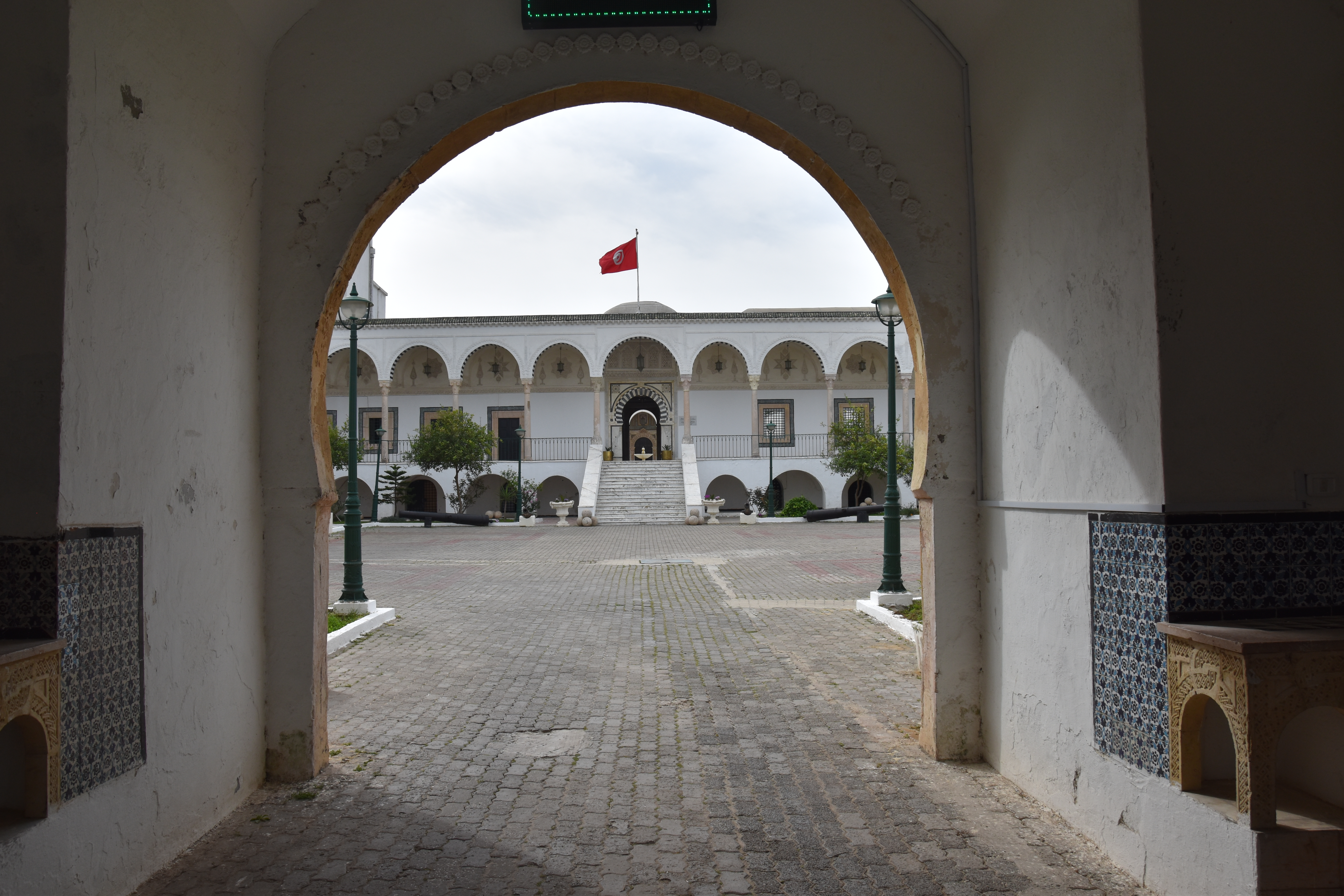
- Manouba Military Museum

- Location in Tunisia
- Coordinates: 36°48′28″N 10°6′4″E
- Country: Tunisia
- Governorate: Manouba Governorate
- Delegation(s): Manouba

Government
  - Mayor: Slim Ben Amara (Independent)

Population (2022)
  - Total: 36,194
- Time zone: UTC1 (CET)

Manouba (Arabic: منوبة manūbā) is a city in north-eastern Tunisia, and is part the metropolitan area of Tunis, also called Grand Tunis. It is located at the west of Tunis city center at around 36°48′28″N 10°6′4″E. It is the capital city of Manouba Governorate.

Manouba is well known for its university. It is also often viewed as a desirable place for family life because of its security, availability of various services and its high level of education.

== History ==
Historically, Manouba is noted as the birthplace of the Sufi saint Sayyida ʿĀʾisha al-Mannūbiyya (1199–1267 CE), and until 2012 the city contained a shrine to her, supposedly her father's house. It was customary in the nineteenth and early twentieth centuries, for the Beys of Tunis to make a ritual circuit of city's the great shrines on the 27th day of Ramaḍān (laylat al-Qadr) and visit this shrine.

More recently, up until the Tunisian revolution of January 2011, once a week, on Sundays or Mondays, ritualistic processions were held. During the day, the shrines were reserved space for women, devoted to music and trance rituals. At night, they became men's space, dedicated to Ṣūfī ceremonies (dhikr). However, on 6 October 2012, the shrine was burned down by religious extremists, thought to be young Salafis; ʿĀʾisha's catafalque was entirely destroyed.

The Institute of Arabic Literature of the White Fathers, which would later become the Pontifical Institute of Arab and Islamic Studies, had a study center in Manouba before it was moved to Rome in 1964.

== Gallery ==
Manouba
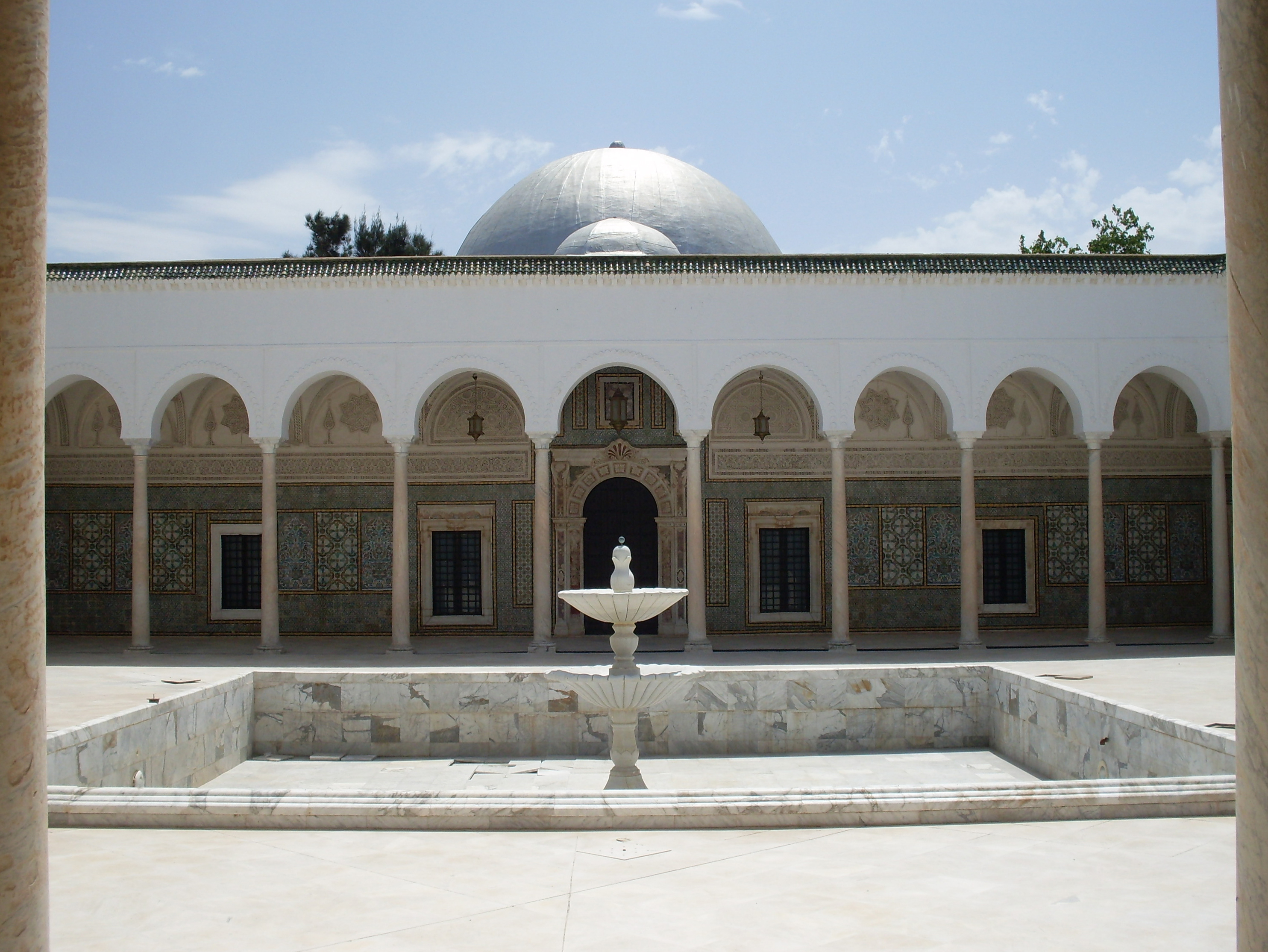
Manouba Palais la rose 6.

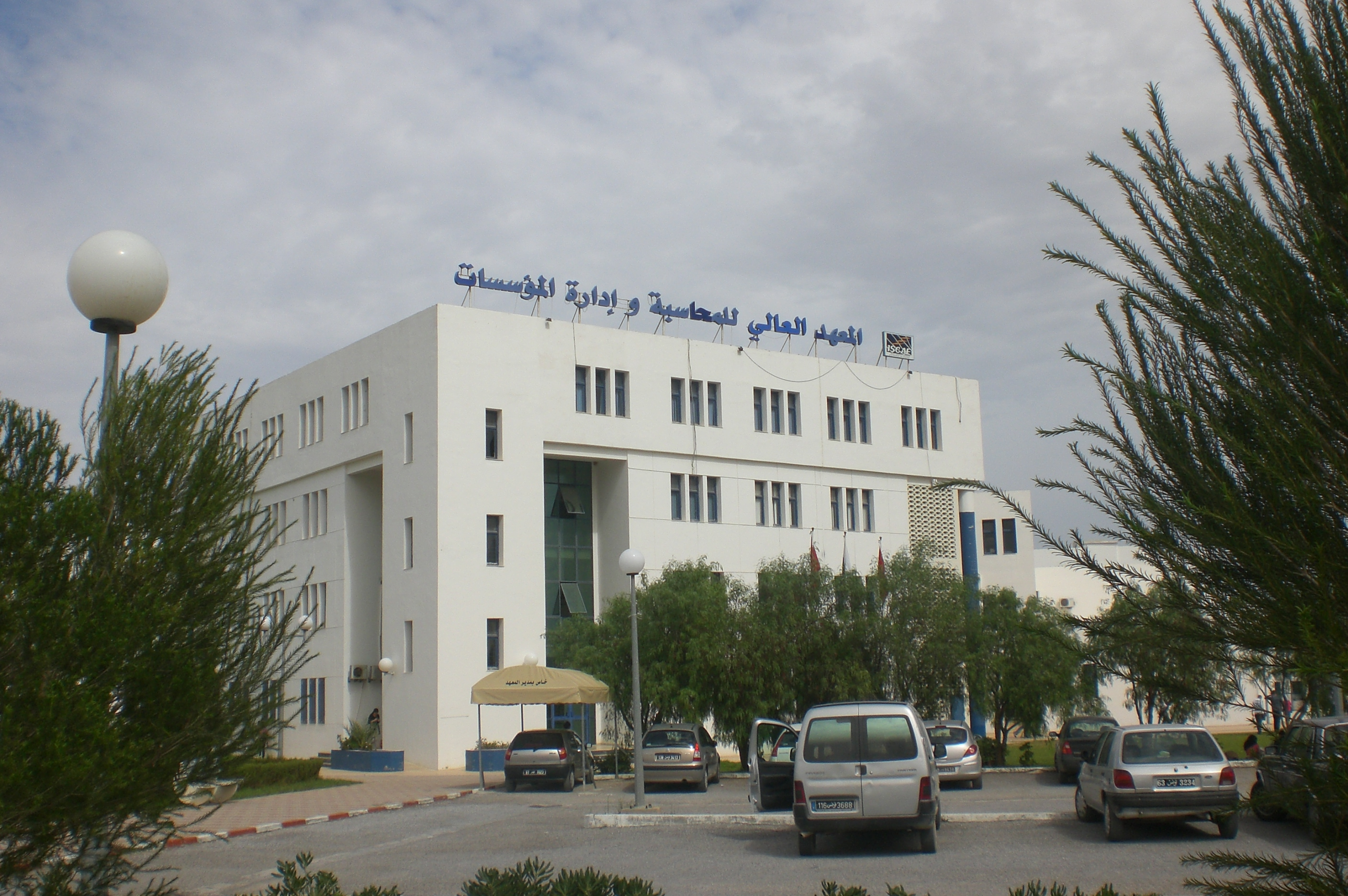
ISCAE Université Manouba Tunis.

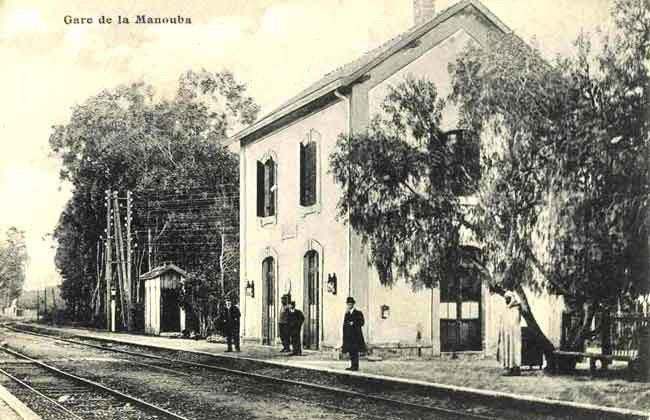
Early C20 picture of Mannouba railway station.

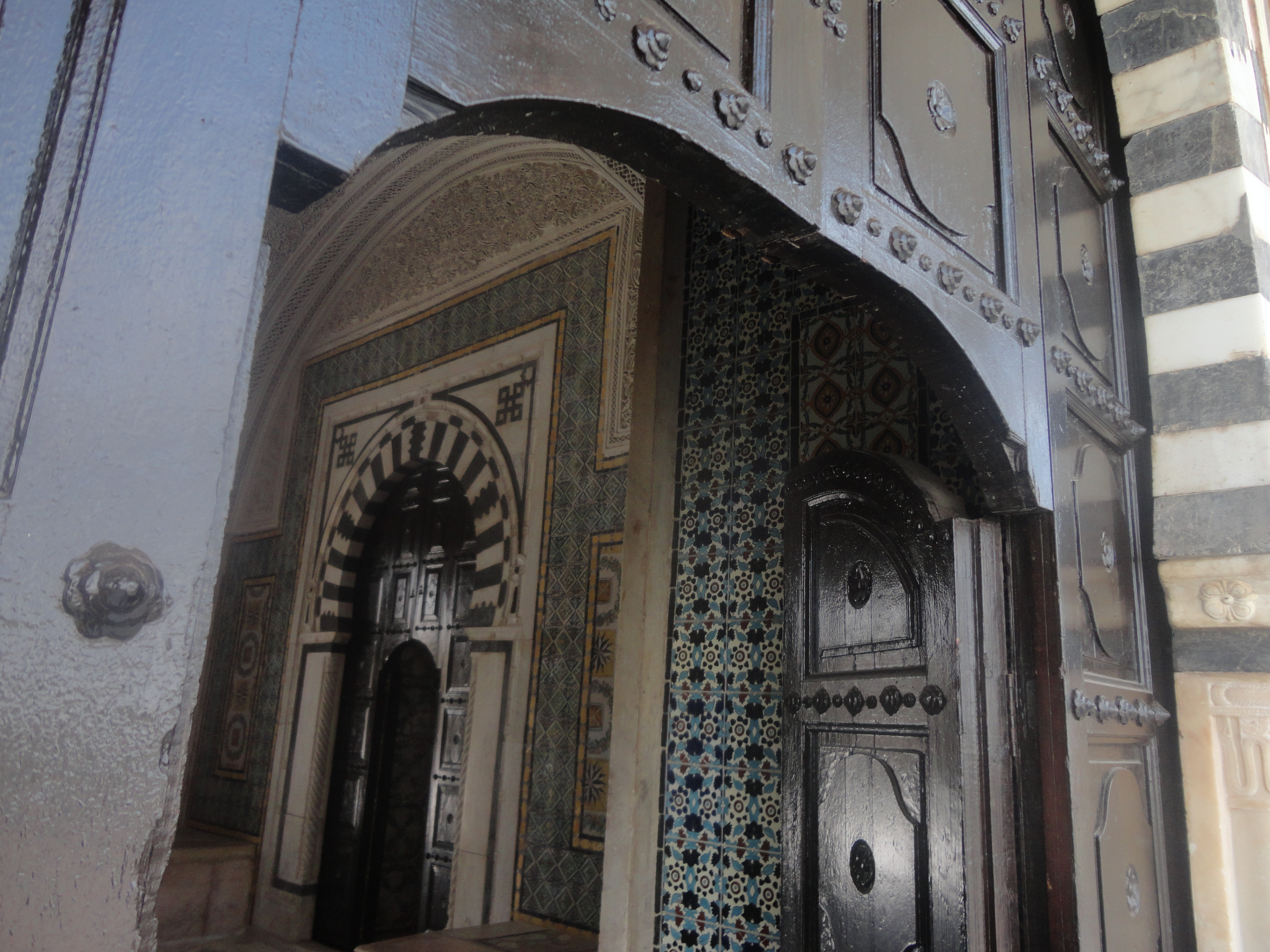
Entrance to the Musée de mannouba.
