= Bab el Khadra =

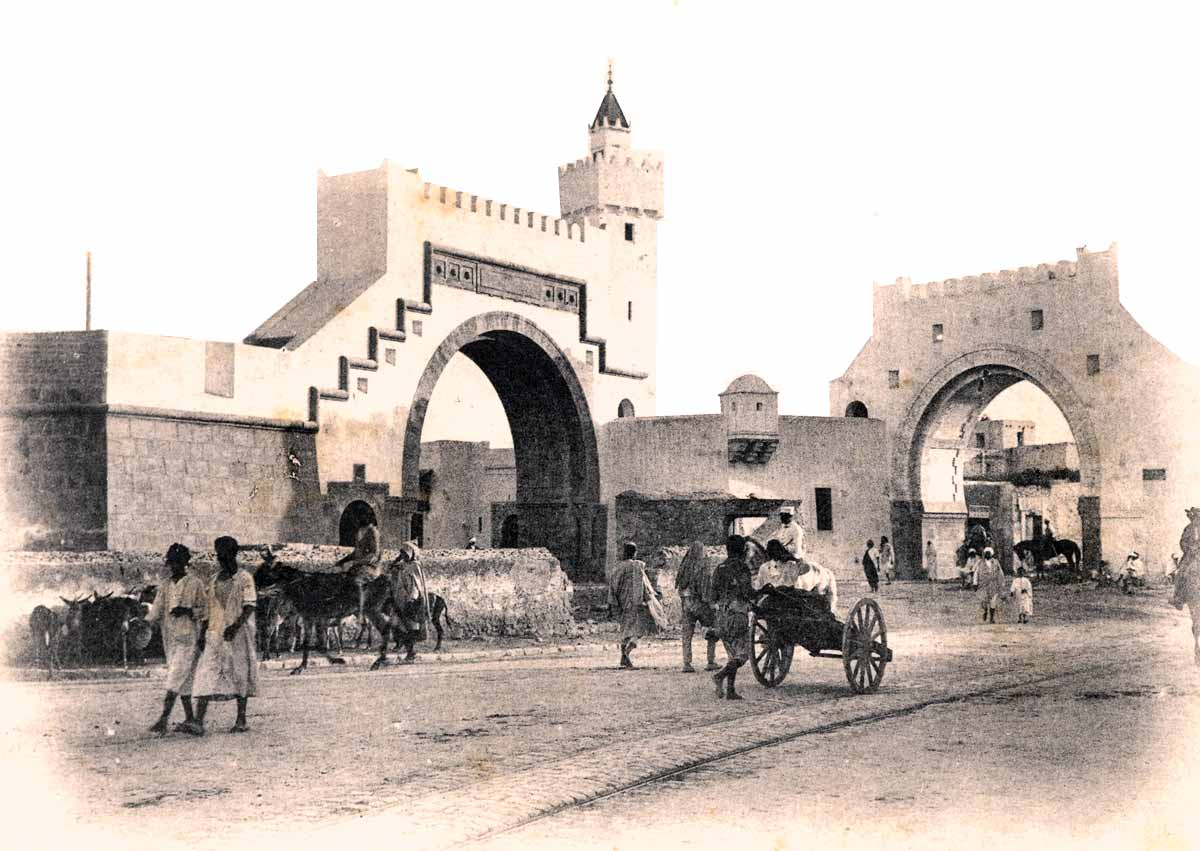
- Bab el Khadra in 1890
- Etymology: "Gate of the Green Gardens", for the nearby market of crops

General information
- Town or city: Tunis
- Country: Tunisia
- Coordinates: 36.80923°N 10.1735°E
- Completed: 1881

Bab El Khadra (or the Gate of the Green Gardens in English) is one of the gates of the medina of Tunis, the capital of Tunisia. It was the gate that led from Tunis to Carthage and Ariana.

The original structure was a simple arch, but this was destroyed and rebuilt in its current, expanded form in 1881 by the French colonizers. It has a distinctly European style and resembles the gates of a European castle.

== Gallery ==
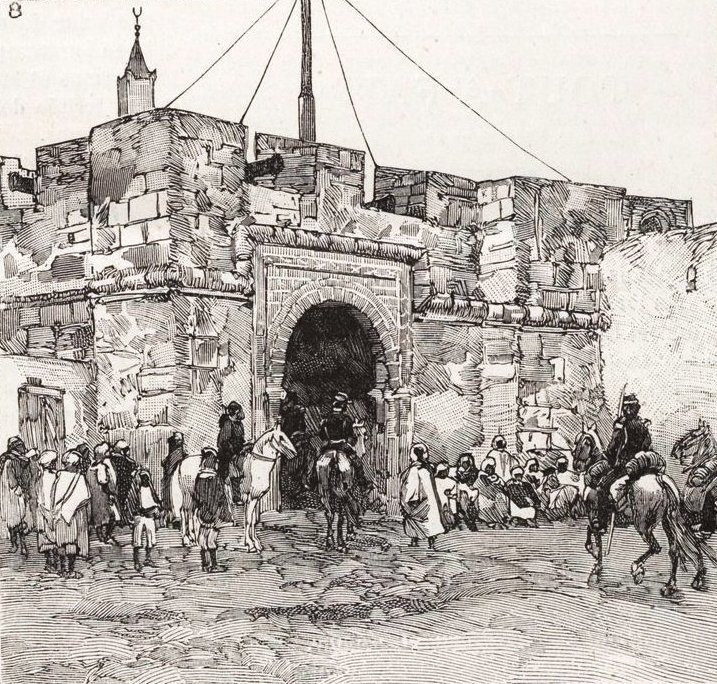
The original single-arch Bab El Khadra, shortly before it was torn down and replaced by the current version

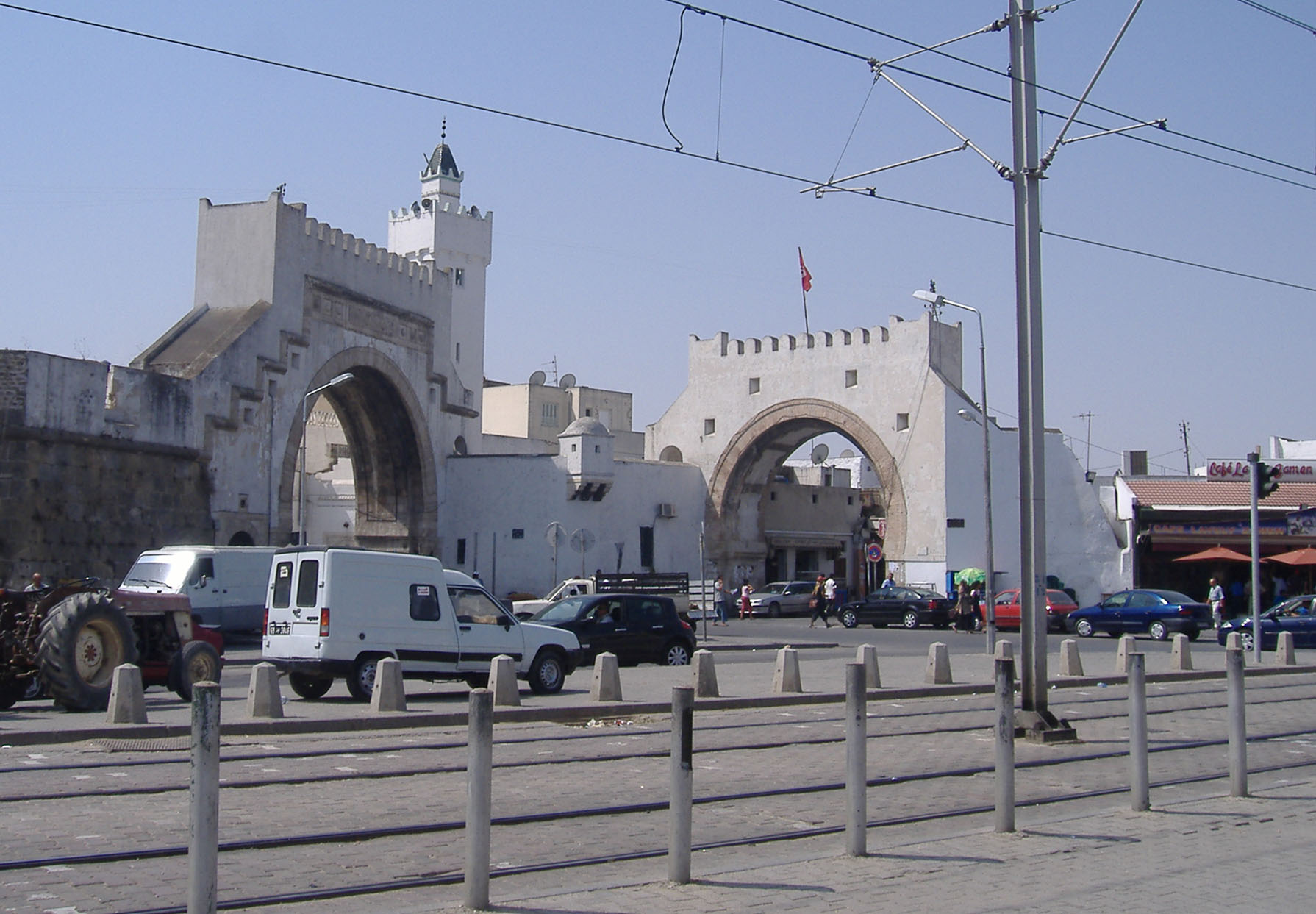
The replacement (1881) Bab El Khadra, photographed in 2007
