= El Kayal Mosque =

Mosque in Tunis, Tunisia

- جامع الكيال
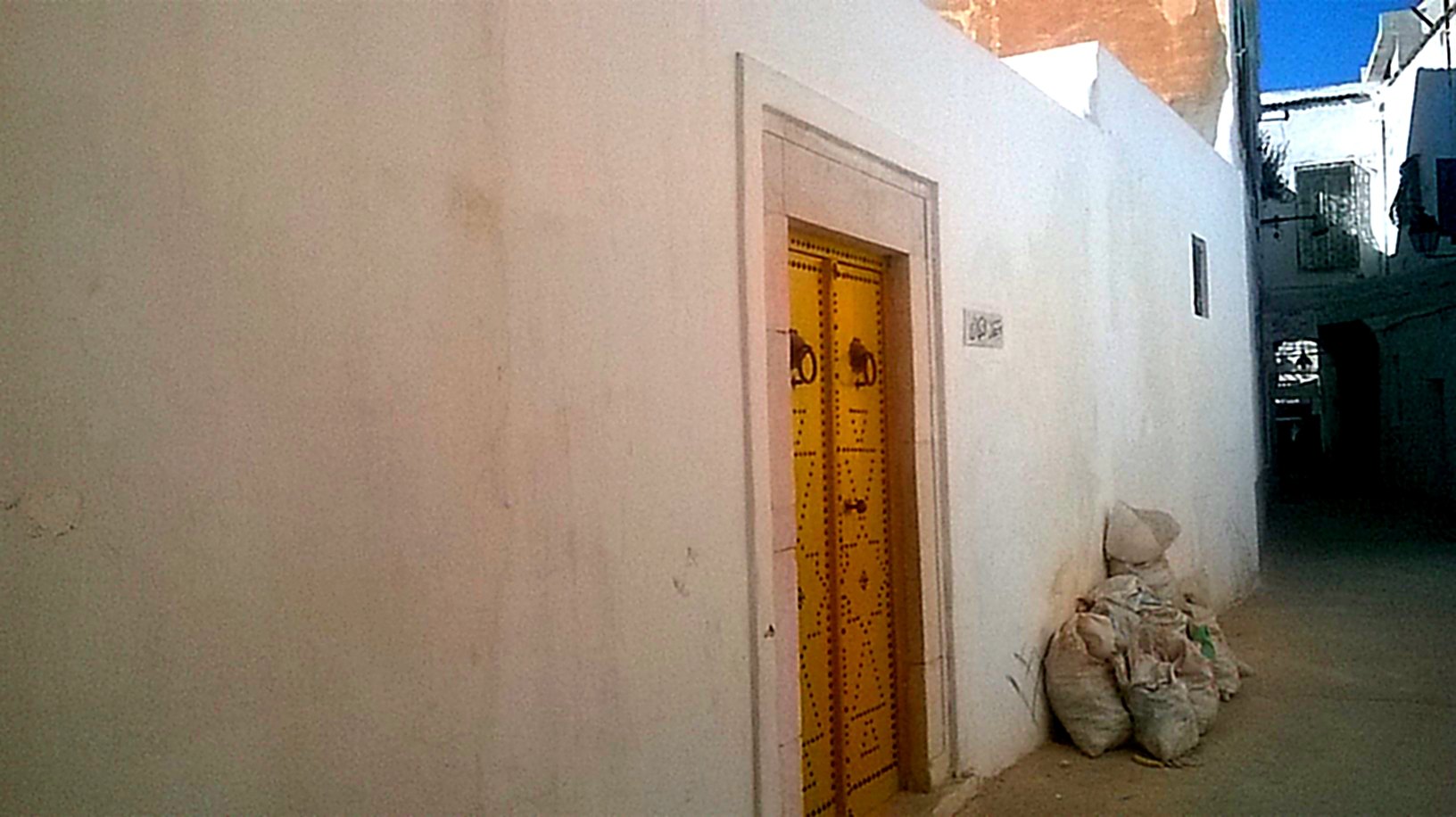

- Location within Tunisia

Religion
- Affiliation: Islam
- Branch/tradition: Sunni

Location
- Location: Tunis, Tunisia
- Interactive map of El Kayal Mosque
- Coordinates: 36.805637°N 10.172127°E

Architecture
- Type: Mosque

El Kayal Mosque (Arabic: جامع الكيال) is a Tunisian mosque in the north of the Medina of Tunis, in Bab Souika suburb.

== Localization ==
The mosque can be found in 4 El Mehrzi Street.

== Etymology ==
According to the historian Mohamed Belkhodja, the mosque got its name from the founder, a grains measurer called Kayal (Arabic: كيال) in Tunisian dialect.

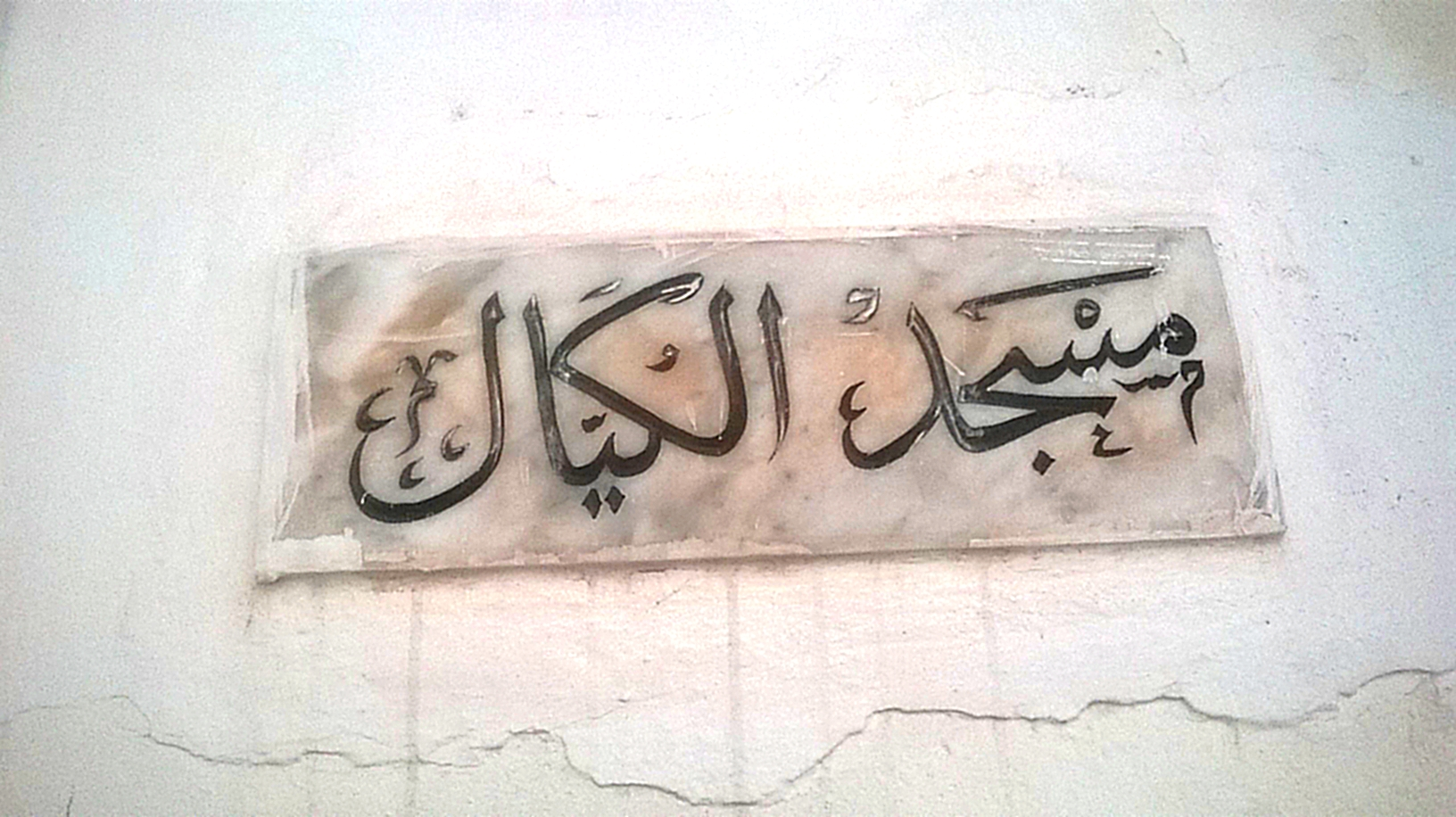
Marble plaque with the name of the mosque

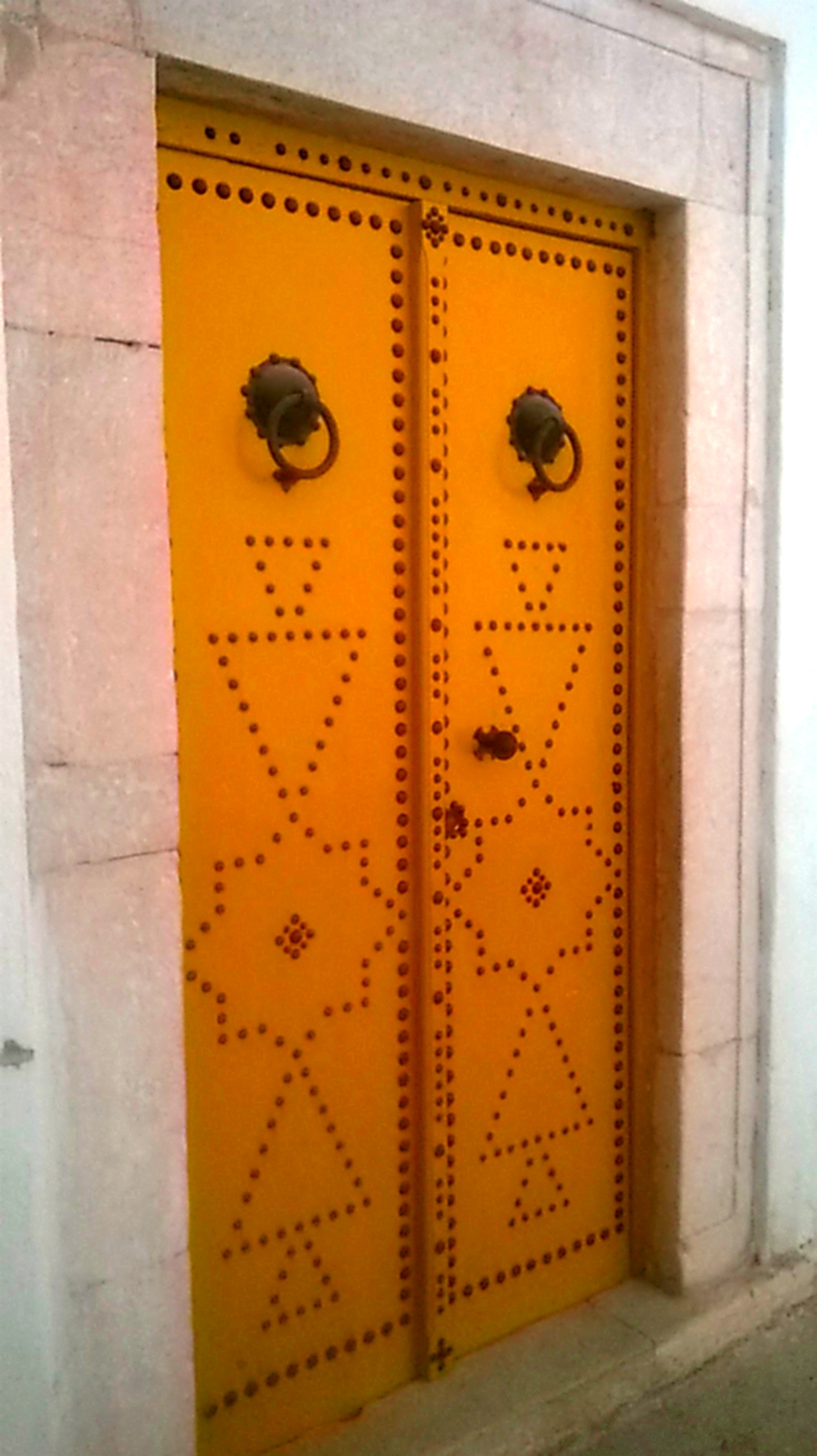
Main entrance of the mosque
