= El Bradia Mosque =

Mosque in Tunis, Tunisia

- جامع البرادعية
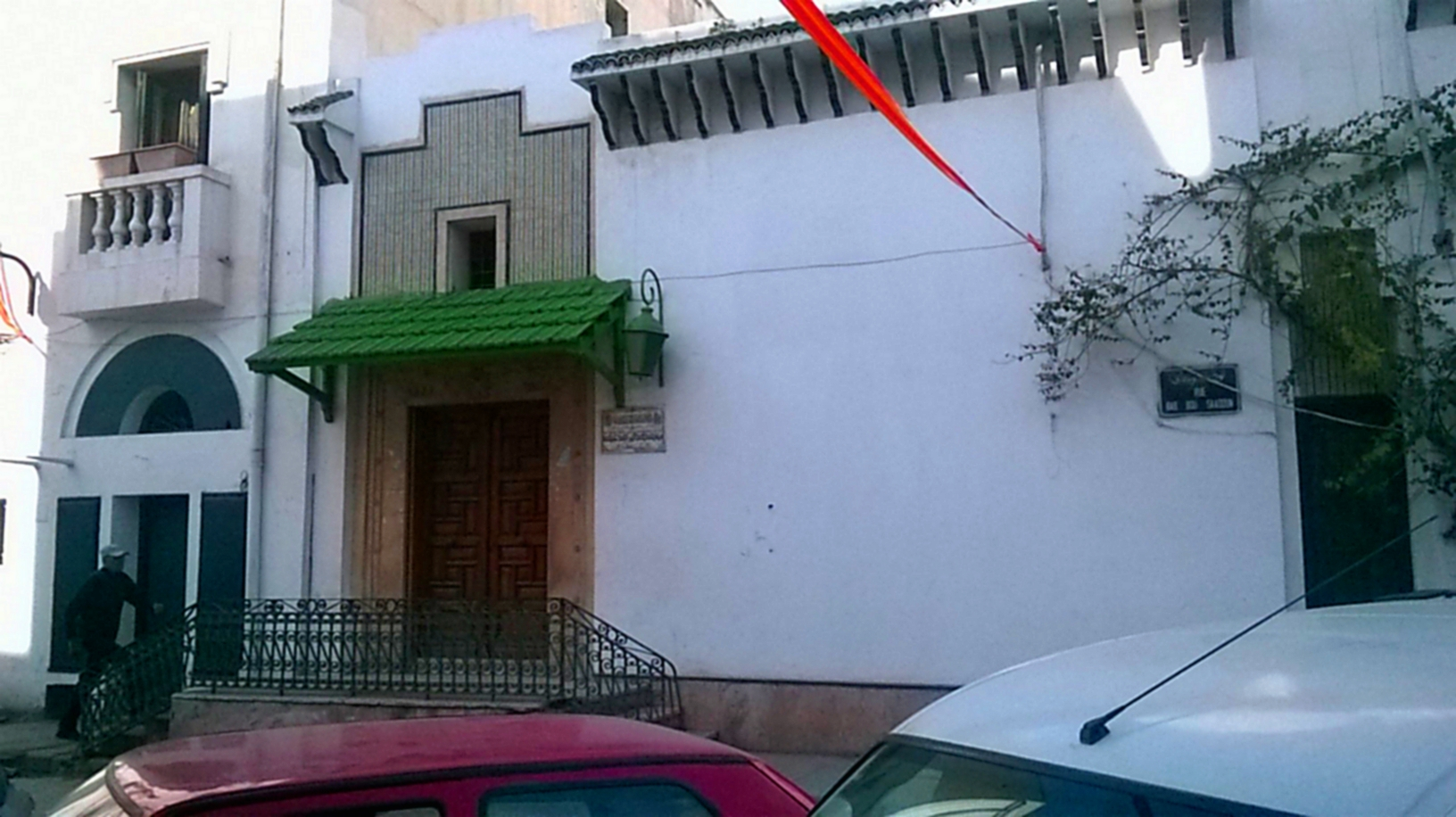

- Location within Tunisia

Religion
- Affiliation: Sunni Islam

Location
- Location: Tunis, Tunisia
- Interactive map of El Bradia Mosque
- Coordinates: 36.805519°N 10.167643°E

Architecture
- Type: Mosque

El Bradia Mosque (Arabic: جامع البرادعية) is a small mosque in the north of the medina of Tunis, in Bab Souika suburb.

== Localization ==
It can be found in 1 Bab Saadoun Street.

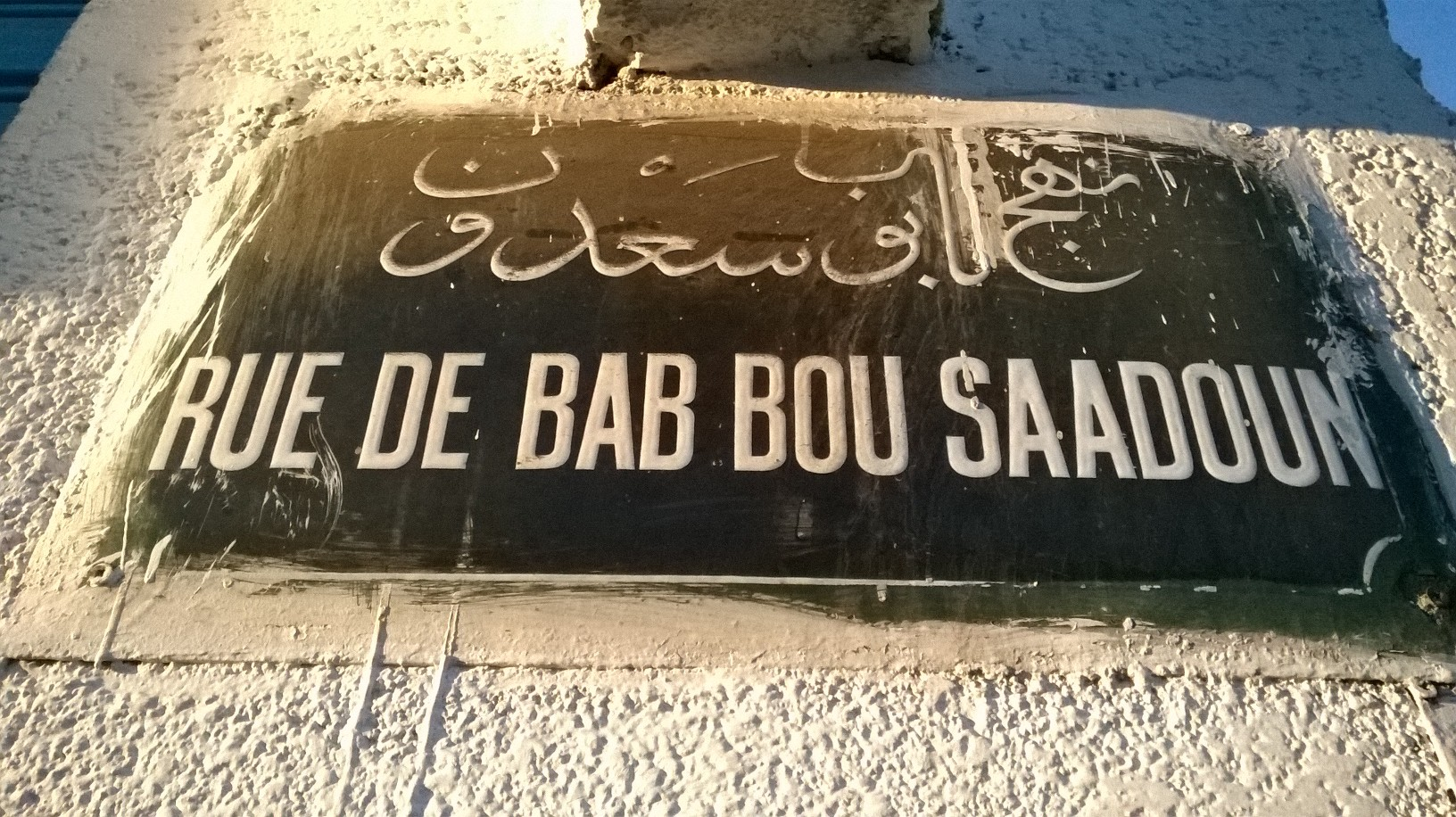
Metallic plaque of Bab Bou Saadoun Street

== Etymology ==
The mosque got its name from the saddle makers who used to work near it.

== History ==
It was built in the 15th century, during the Hafsid era.

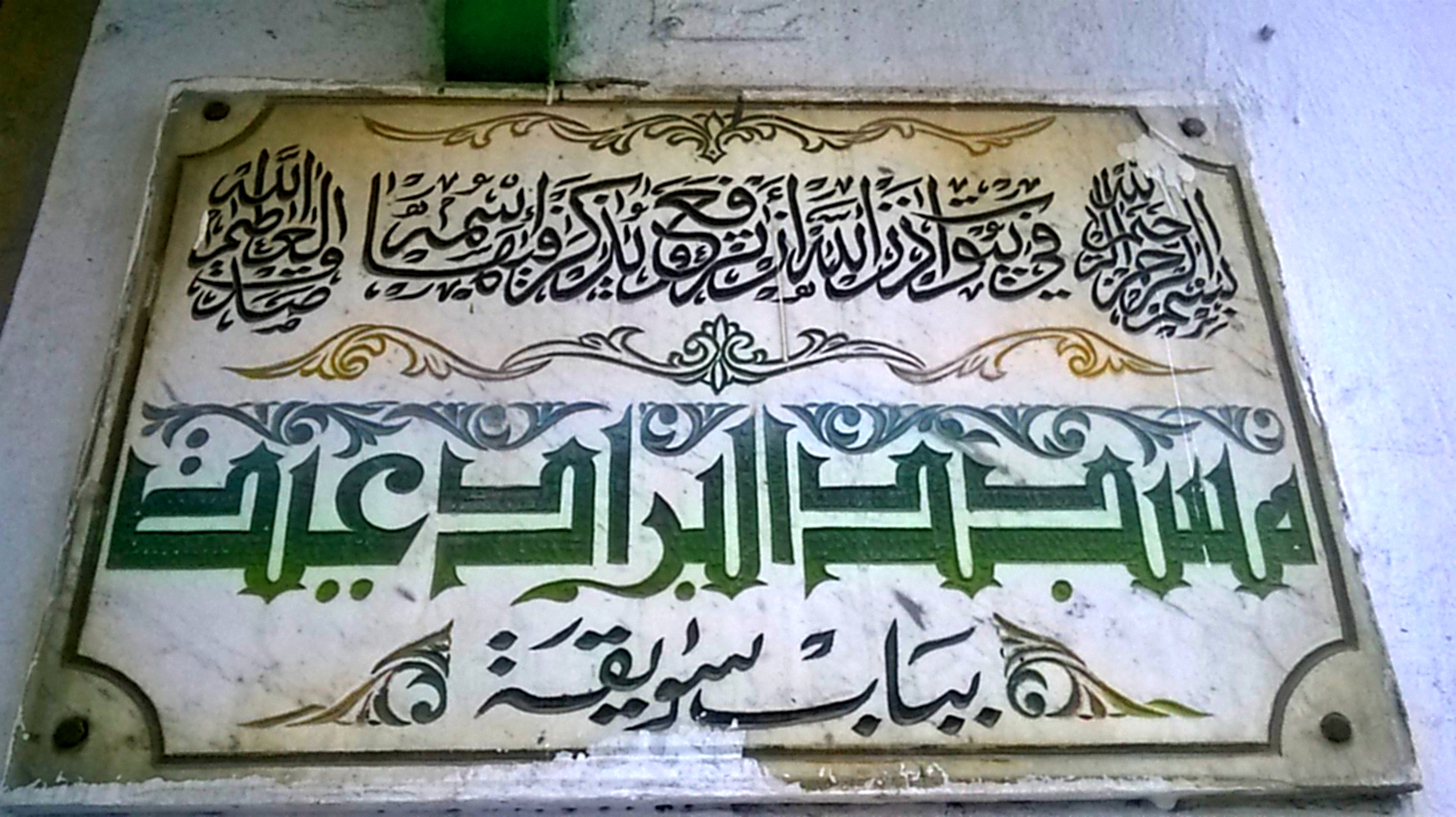
Marble plaque with the name and address of the mosque, and a quote from the coran

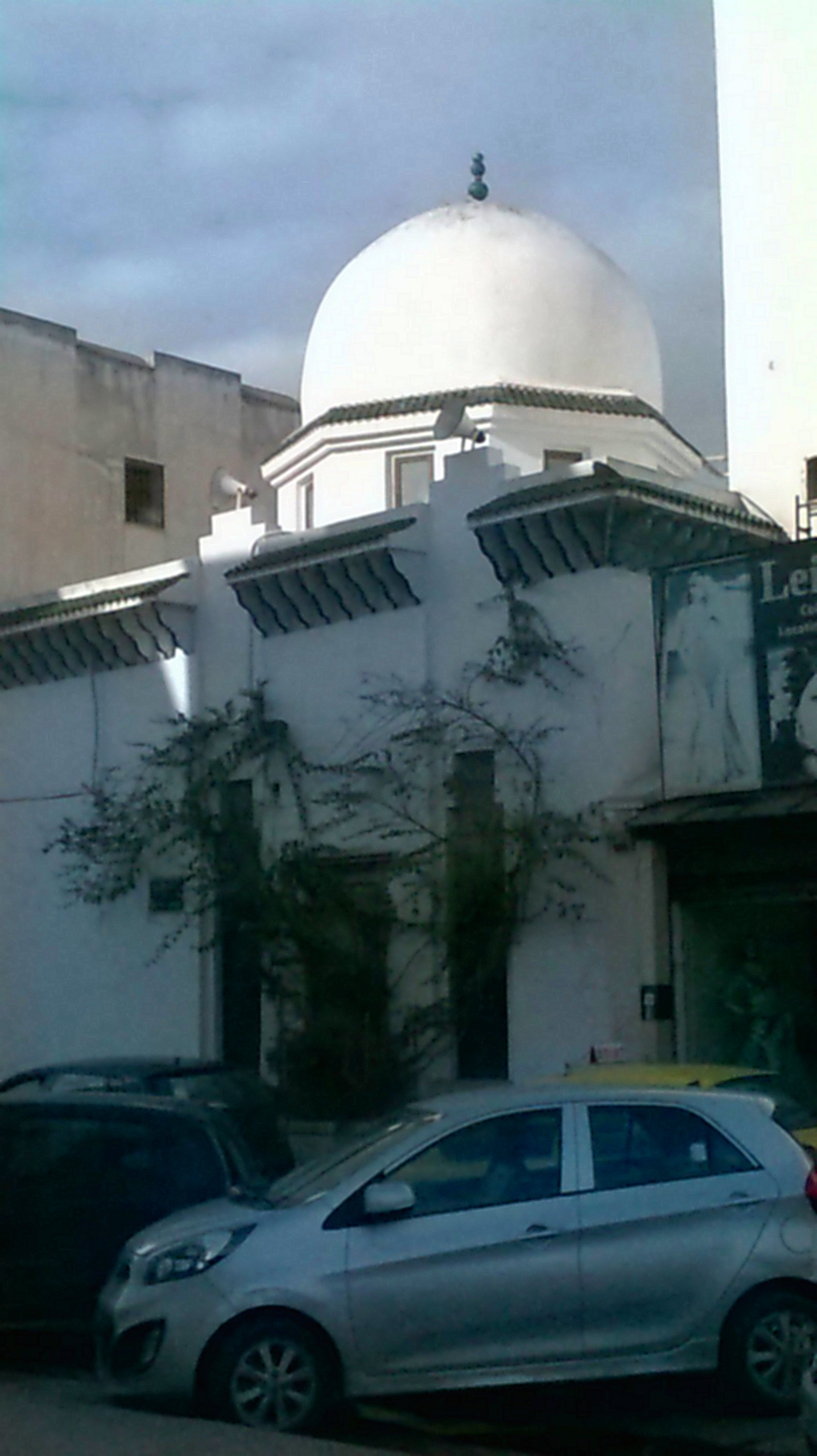
Dome of the mosque
