= Sidi Amor Mosque =

Mosque in Tunis, Tunisia

- جامع سيدي عامر
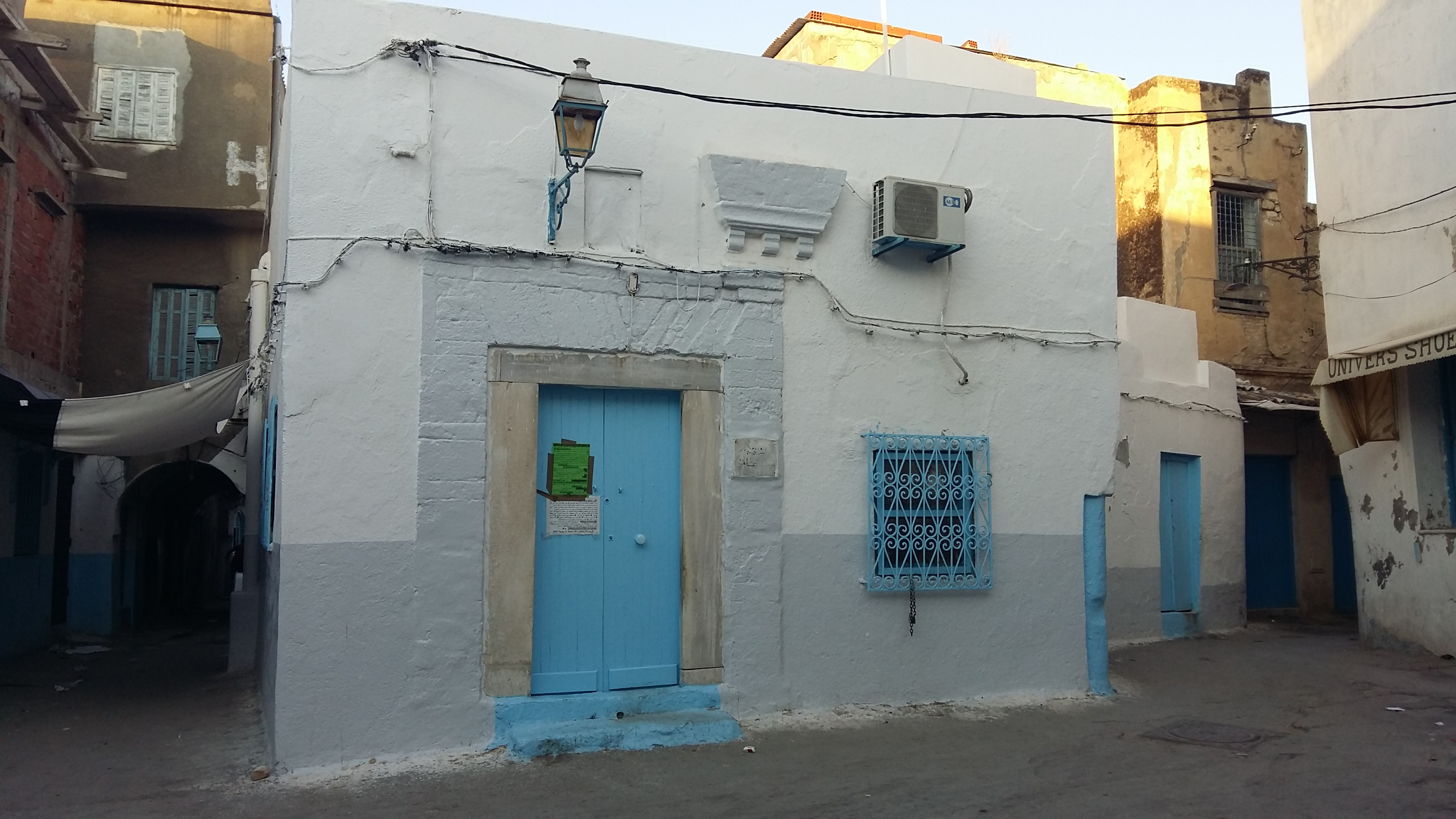

- Location within Tunisia

Religion
- Affiliation: Sunni Islam

Location
- Location: Tunis, Tunisia
- Coordinates: 36.797425°N 10.173472°E

Architecture
- Type: Mosque

Sidi Amor Mosque (Arabic: جامع سيدي عامر), also known as the Sidi Amor small mosque, is a Tunisian mosque located in the south of the medina of Tunis. It is an official historical monument since November 16, 1928.

== Localization ==
The mosque is located in 24 the Sidi Ali Azzouz Street. It got its name from the saint Sidi Amor Al Batach who was born in La Marsa and who was buried in the mosque in 1526.

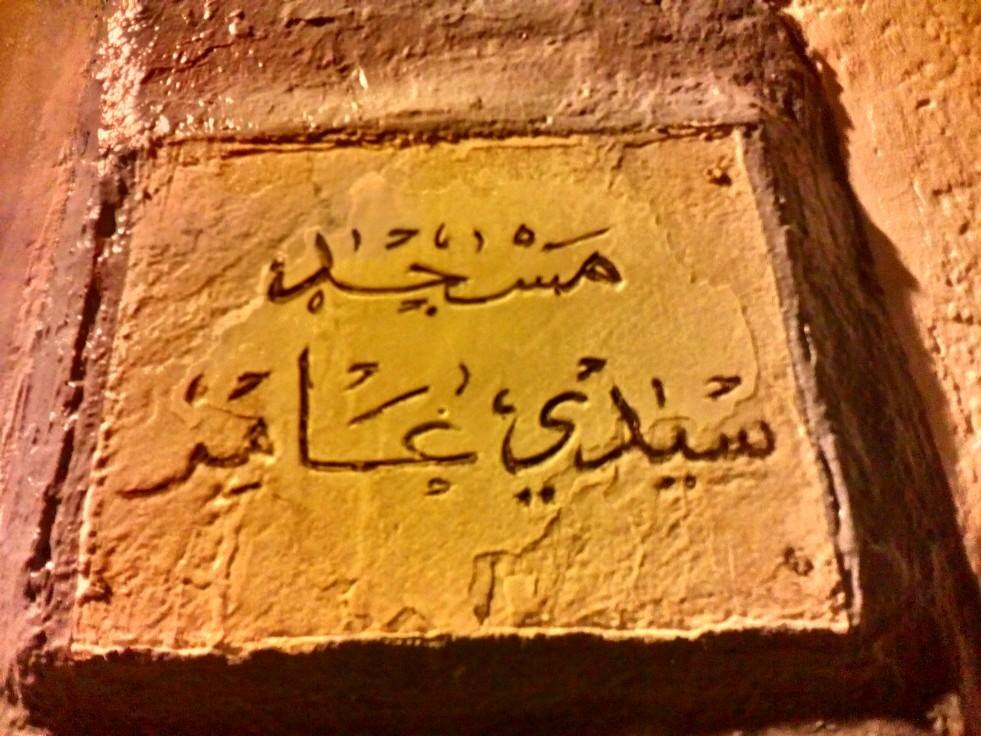
Marble panel with the name of the mosque
