= Menzel Jemil Delegation =

Delegation of Tunisia

Menzel Jemil Delegation is a delegation (county) of the Bizerte Governorate in northwestern Tunisia. It borders on the Bizerte Lagoon. As of 2004 census it had a population of 39,691.

There are two towns (municipalities) in the Menzel Jemil Delegation, Menzel Jemil and Menzel Abderrahmane. However, they are both considered part of the city of Bizerte metropolitan area.
