= Ali Boumnijel =

Tunisian footballer (born 1966)

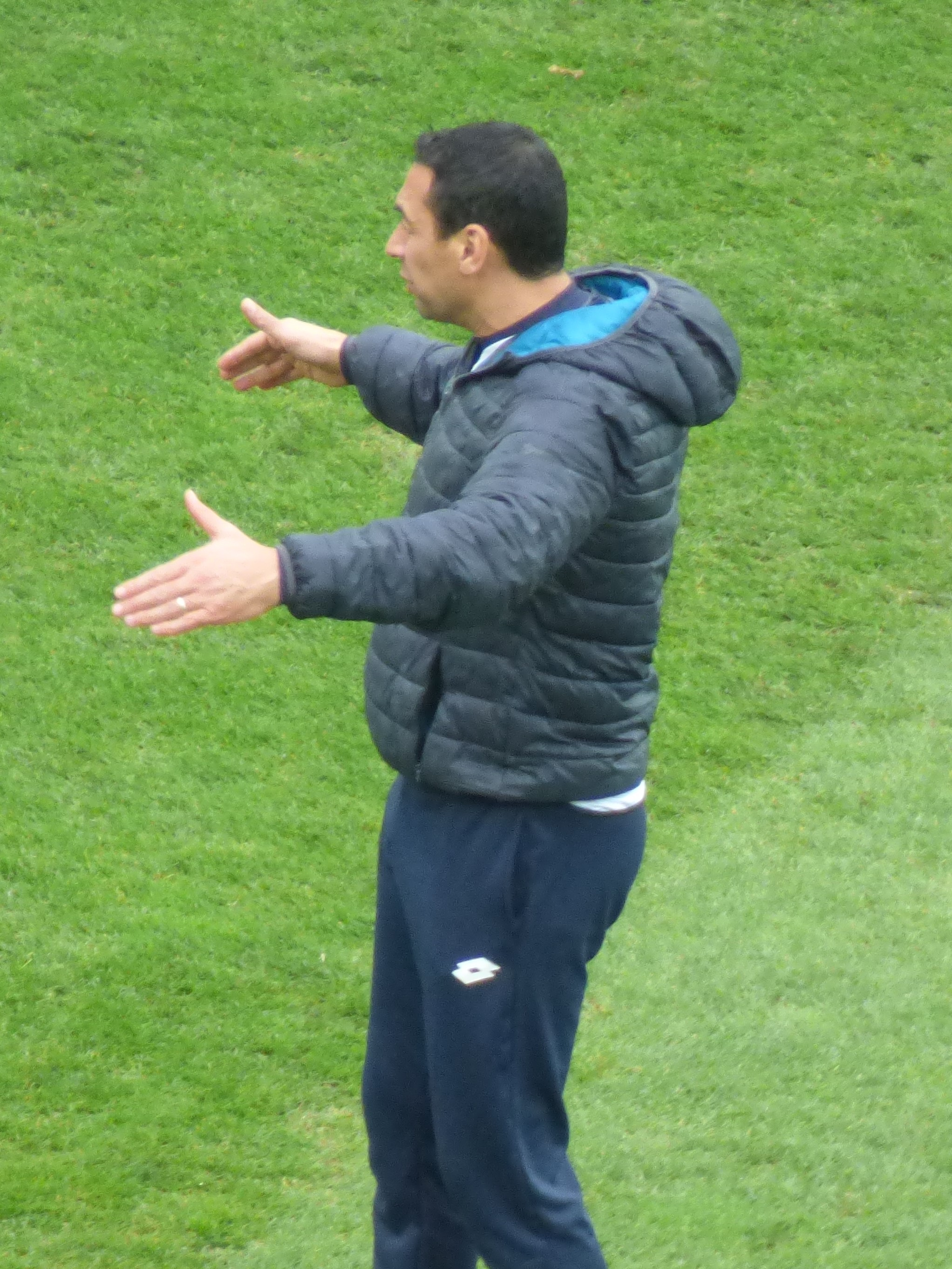
- Boumnijel in November 2019

Personal information
- Date of birth: 13 April 1966 (age 60)
- Place of birth: Menzel Jemil, Tunisia
- Height: 1.89 m (6 ft 2 in)
- Position: Goalkeeper

Team information
- Current team: Al-Hazem (assistant)

Senior career*
Years	Team	Apps	(Gls)
1988–1997	Gueugnon	166	(0)
1991–1992	→ Nancy (loan)	7	(0)
1998–2003	Bastia	15	(0)
2003–2004	Rouen	23	(0)
2004–2007	Club Africain	84	(0)
Total		289	(0)

International career
1991–2007	Tunisia	51	(0)

Managerial career
- 2011–2012: Tunisia (goalkeeper coach)
- 2012–2013: Umm Salal (goalkeeper coach)
- 2014–2016: China (assistant)
- 2017–2018: Étoile du Sahel (assistant)
- 2019–2022: Sochaux (assistant)
- 2022–2024: Tunisia (assistant)
- Club Africain (assistant)
- 2025–: Al-Hazem (assistant)
Medal record
Men's football
Representing Tunisia
Africa Cup of Nations
Winner	2004 Tunisia
- * Club domestic league appearances and goals

Ali Boumnijel (Arabic: علي بومنيجل, born 13 April 1966) is a Tunisian football manager and former professional player, who is the currently assistant coach of Saudi Pro League club Al-Hazem.

== Personal life ==
Born in Menzel Jemil, Boumnijel holds Tunisian and French nationalities.

== Club career ==
He began his career in FC Gueugnon in France, however without playing any games. His first game as a professional footballer came on 20 October 1991 for AS Nancy in a 1–3 loss to AJ Auxerre. Afterwards he returned to his previous team, where he played five seasons, until changing to SC Bastia. He played for Bastia for six years, and then one season at FC Rouen. In 2004, he moved back to Tunisia to play for Club Africain.

== International career ==
In the national team he debuted on 27 November 1991 against Côte d'Ivoire. Having established himself as a competitive goalkeeper he went on to play for Tunisia in the 1998 FIFA World Cup, 2002 FIFA World Cup and 2006 FIFA World Cup . Boumnijel was Tunisia's first choice goalkeeper, and played at the 2004 African Nations Cup where the Tunisia team won. In the semifinals he saved a crucial penalty from Peter Odemwingie to help Tunisia beat Nigeria in a penalty shootout.

Aged 40, he was the oldest player at the 2006 FIFA World Cup, Boumnijel has been praised for his leadership and goalkeeping skills during the World Cup.

== Honours ==
Tunisia

- Africa Cup of Nations: 2004
