= Menzel Bourguiba =

Menzel Bourguiba منزل بورقيبة Ferryville
- Town
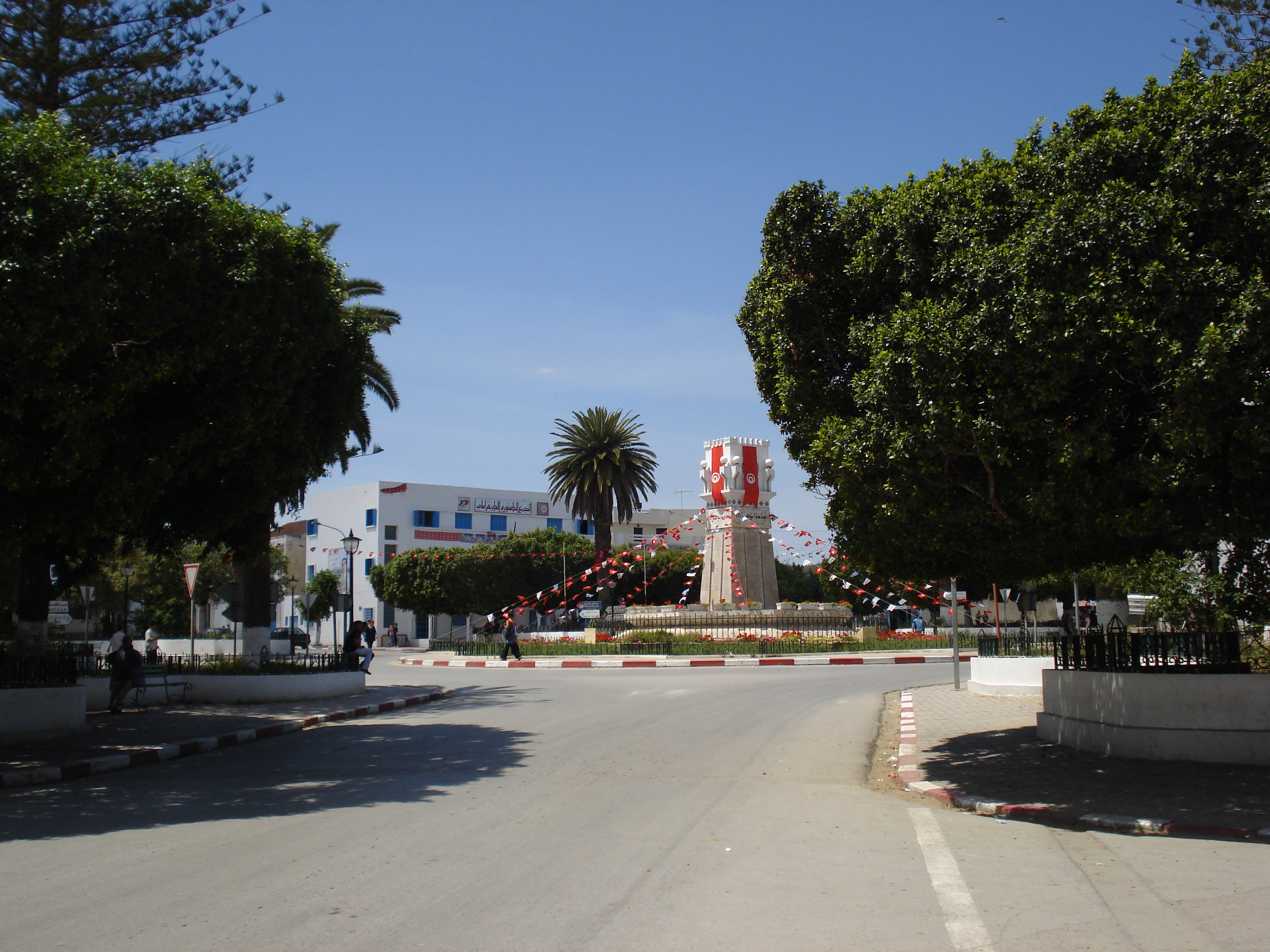

- Location in Tunisia
- Coordinates: 37°9′N 9°47′E
- Country: Tunisia
- Governorate: Bizerte Governorate

Population (2022)
  - Total: 58,800
- Time zone: UTC+1 (CET)

Menzel Bourguiba (Arabic: منزل بورقيبة, romanized: Manzil Būrgībah, lit. 'House of Bourguiba'), formerly known as Ferryville, is a town located in the extreme north of Tunisia, about 60 kilometres (37 mi) from Tunis, in the Bizerte Governorate.

== Toponymy ==
The town's name translates as "House of Bourguiba", as it was named after the first president of independent Tunisia, Habib Bourguiba, in 1956. During the French protectorate of Tunisia (1881–1956), Menzel Bourguiba was named Ferryville, referring to contemporary French minister Jules Ferry and was nicknamed Petit Paris ("Little Paris") by its inhabitants of French origin. In addition, it housed the French Navy′s Sidi-Abdallah Arsenal, which was only handed over to the Tunisian authorities in 1962 following the Bizerte crisis and the Battle of Evacuation, today commemorated on a tunisian national holiday.

== Geography ==
The town of Menzel Bourguiba is located about 60 kilometres (37 mi) north of Tunis and about 20 kilometres (12 mi) south of Bizerte, capital of the governorate of the same name. It is located in the south-west of the Lac de Bizerte (lake of bizerte), on the narrow strip of land which passes between the lakes of Bizerte and Ichkeul.

An expressway connects the city to the RN8 and the A4 motorway linking Bizerte to Tunis. From Bizerte, the city is accessible from the RN11 which places it halfway between Bizerte and Mateur. In addition, the city is connected to the SNCFT railway network.

Its suburbs consist mainly of the outlying town of Tinja to the west and the Ennejah district a little further south. The Guengla beach, near which several colonial-style houses are still standing. The hills of Sidi Yahya and Sidi Abdallah are highly visible from the city.

== History ==
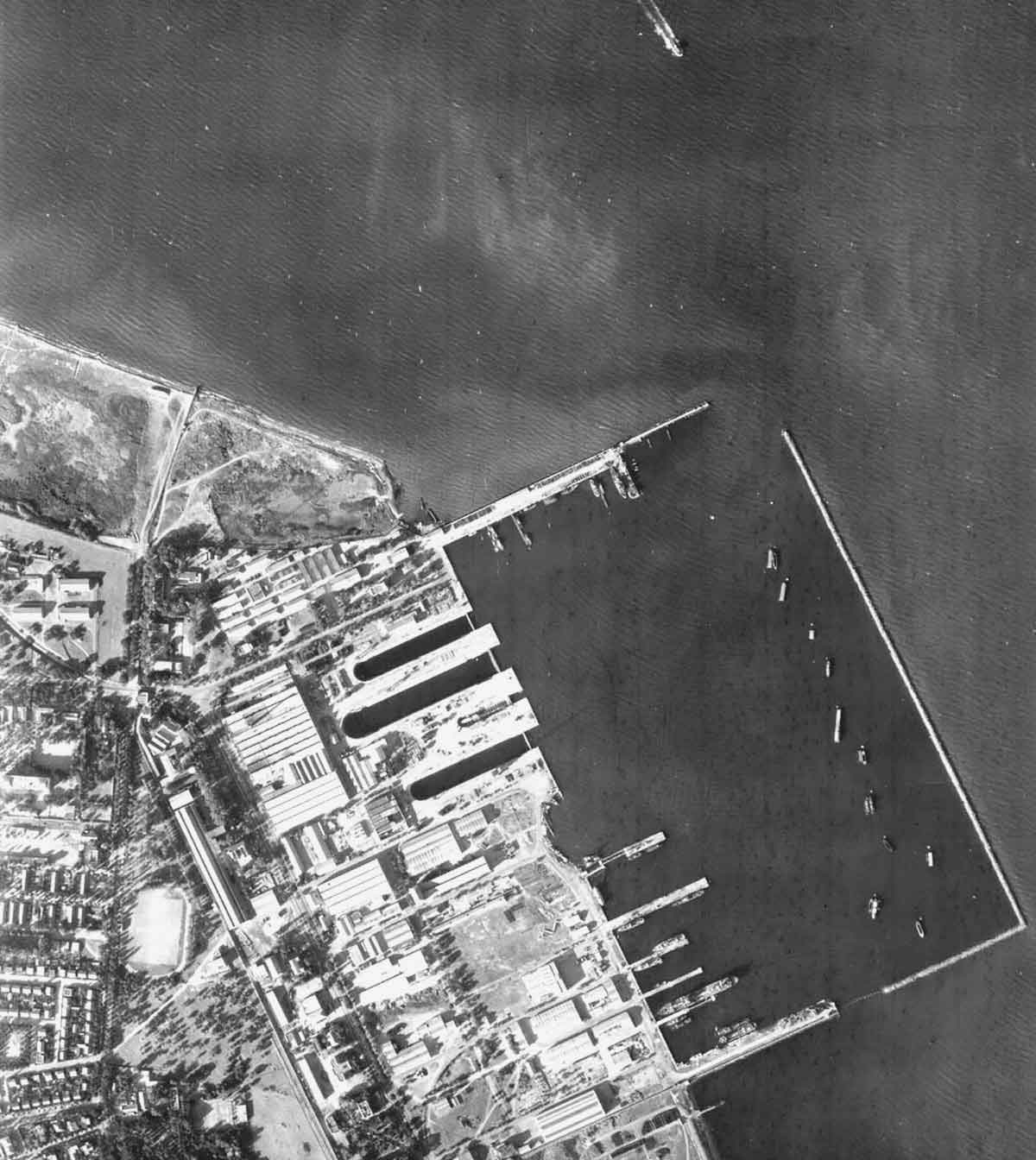
The naval base, Arsenal Sidi-Abdellah, in 1960

In 1897, the French government took the decision to build an arsenal on a strategic site between lakes Ichkeul and Bizerte. As the North African Real Estate Company owned a large part of the land nearby, it began to draw up plans for the town, to which the company's largest shareholder, Joseph Décoret, wished to give his name.

His untimely death, even before the town was erected as a municipality, allowed the general resident to impose the name Ferryville in honour of the French minister Jules Ferry, the inspirer of the French protectorate of Tunisia.

During the Second World War, the city was relatively spared, unlike the nearby town of Bizerte, 77% of whose European quarter was destroyed by American bombing in late 1942 and early 1943. However, from August 1944 to March 1945, the city suffered a plague epidemic from Morocco and then Algeria, which was contained by the French naval medical services. The official toll of the epidemic was 37 hospitalized patients, ten of whom died. The cases were distributed among the population as follows: 25 Europeans and 12 Tunisians of Tunisian origin. The victims occupy a wide variety of positions in society: 18 are foreigners in the navy (eight deaths) and eight work in the arsenal (two deaths), including two naval executives.

In 1952, the city was the scene of clashes marking the uprising of Tunisia for its accession to independence. Thus, on 17 January, one day before the arrest of Habib Bourguiba and the holding of the clandestine Neo-Destour congress proclaiming armed struggle, demonstrations broke out and were harshly repressed, with three dead and around fifty wounded. A local odonym, "Avenue du 17-Janvier 1952", recalls this event.

The name of the town, which means "house of Bourguiba" in Arabic, was given to it in 1956 by Bourguiba himself, who had just gained independence for Tunisia and the following year became the first President of the Republic. By giving this name to Ferryville, he thus underlined the return of the country's sovereignty.

However, the Sidi-Abdallah arsenal was not evacuated by the French navy until 1 July 1962. Nowadays, the arsenal has become a shipyard for the repair and maintenance of merchant ships. It also contains small manufacturing industries.

== Economy ==
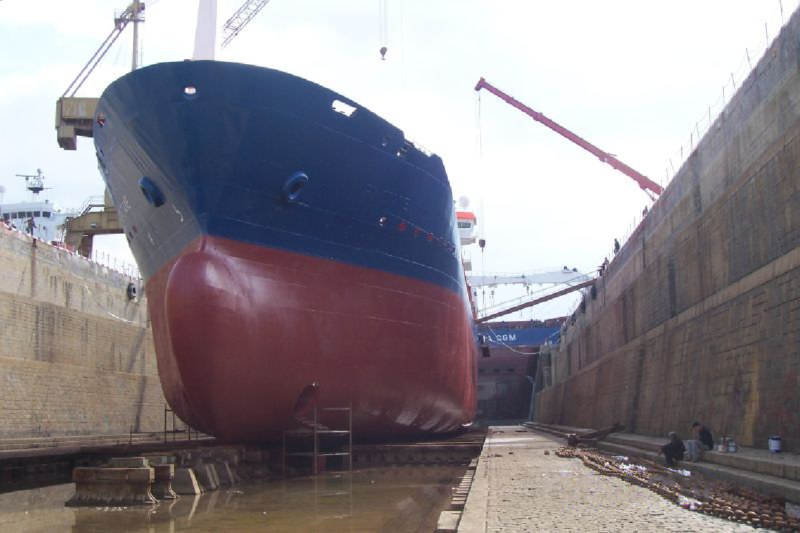
Chemical tanker in Menzel Bourguiba

Menzel Bourguiba is an important town for economic reasons. Its economy is based mainly around metallurgy. It was founded as a naval installation under French rule, because of its strategic location between two lakes: The inland Ichkeul Lake on the west, and Bizerte Lake on the east, which connects to the Mediterranean Sea by the Bizerte canal.

Its most important economic activity was the ailing state-owned shipyard. The yard has seen its workforce decline, after the high level of activity in the 1970s and 1980s, when Tunisia had a larger merchant fleet and when the Soviet Union used Menzel Bourguiba to drydock its ships. At that time, the yard employed over 1,300 people. It was bought by the French ship repair company, Compagnie Marseille Réparation in 2004 and has been renamed to CMR Tunisia Ship Repairs.

== Climate ==
Climate data for Menzel Bourguiba (1981–2010, extremes 1901–2017)
Month	Jan	Feb	Mar	Apr	May	Jun	Jul	Aug	Sep	Oct	Nov	Dec	Year
Record high °C (°F)	27.0 (80.6)	27.2 (81.0)	33.5 (92.3)	34.2 (93.6)	40.4 (104.7)	46.0 (114.8)	46.6 (115.9)	48.0 (118.4)	45.0 (113.0)	40.5 (104.9)	34.0 (93.2)	27.2 (81.0)	48.0 (118.4)
Mean daily maximum °C (°F)	15.6 (60.1)	16.0 (60.8)	18.0 (64.4)	20.4 (68.7)	25.0 (77.0)	29.1 (84.4)	32.3 (90.1)	32.8 (91.0)	29.6 (85.3)	25.8 (78.4)	20.5 (68.9)	16.8 (62.2)	23.5 (74.3)
Daily mean °C (°F)	11.2 (52.2)	11.3 (52.3)	12.8 (55.0)	15.1 (59.2)	19.0 (66.2)	23.1 (73.6)	26.0 (78.8)	26.6 (79.9)	23.9 (75.0)	20.4 (68.7)	15.7 (60.3)	12.5 (54.5)	18.1 (64.6)
Mean daily minimum °C (°F)	7.0 (44.6)	6.9 (44.4)	8.1 (46.6)	10.1 (50.2)	13.5 (56.3)	17.2 (63.0)	20.1 (68.2)	21.0 (69.8)	19.0 (66.2)	15.8 (60.4)	11.4 (52.5)	8.4 (47.1)	13.2 (55.8)
Record low °C (°F)	−4.2 (24.4)	−1.4 (29.5)	−0.4 (31.3)	1.0 (33.8)	3.1 (37.6)	8.0 (46.4)	8.0 (46.4)	10.0 (50.0)	8.9 (48.0)	4.9 (40.8)	0.0 (32.0)	−0.5 (31.1)	−4.2 (24.4)
Average precipitation mm (inches)	88.8 (3.50)	73.9 (2.91)	57.6 (2.27)	50.6 (1.99)	23.2 (0.91)	10.6 (0.42)	2.2 (0.09)	6.8 (0.27)	44.3 (1.74)	61.3 (2.41)	93.4 (3.68)	115.2 (4.54)	627.9 (24.73)
Average precipitation days (≥ 1.0 mm)	11.3	10.3	9.6	6.5	3.9	1.6	0.6	1.1	4.0	7.8	9.5	11.4	77.6
Average relative humidity (%)	83	80	78	78	75	70	68	69	75	78	83	83	77
Mean monthly sunshine hours	142.6	163.9	217.0	237.0	303.8	330.0	384.4	356.5	267.0	207.7	153.0	133.3	2,896.2
Mean daily sunshine hours	4.6	5.8	7.0	7.9	9.8	11.0	12.4	11.5	8.9	6.7	5.1	4.3	7.9
Source 1: Institut National de la Météorologie (precipitation days 1961–1990 and extremes 1950–2017) (Note: The Station ID for Bizerte is 11414111.)
Source 2: Deutscher Wetterdienst (extremes 1901–1992) Arab Meteorology Book (humidity and sun)

== Twin cities ==
Menzel Bourguiba is twinned with:

- Stuttgart, Germany (since 1971)
- La Seyne-sur-Mer, France (since 2008)

== Menzel Bourguiba Mayors ==
Period	Mayor(s)
1958–1962	Ahmed Ben Hémida
1962–1980	Taïeb Tekaia
1980–1990	Mohamed Dridi
1990–1995	Kamel Dhaouadi
1995–2000	Fethi Sâafi
2000–2005	Fethi M'rabet
2005–2010	Sadok Chalghoumi
2010–2011	Jamel Eddine El Batti
2011–2018	Mohamed Arbi Mimouni
2018–2021	Slaheddine Jebari
2021–Present	Salim Hraga

== Celebrities From Menzel Bourguiba ==
- F. R. David : Singer/Musician
- Majdouline Cherni : Politician
- Mohamed Habib Marzouki : Politician
- Ridha Saidi : Politician
- Aymen Ben Ahmed : Sportsman
- Driss ben Mohamed Laabidi : Retraité de la Garde Nationale
- Paul Barge : French Actor
- Élisabeth Faure : French Painter
- Michel Giliberti :French Painter & Photographer
- Nicole Gotteri : French Historian & Activist
- Jean-Gabriel Montador : French Painter
- Naima abdallah.News Anchor .Senior journaliste Tunisian public tv
- Riadh Bouazizi : former football player
- Nidhal Saadi : Actor
- Taoufik Hajri : cyclist

== Gallery ==
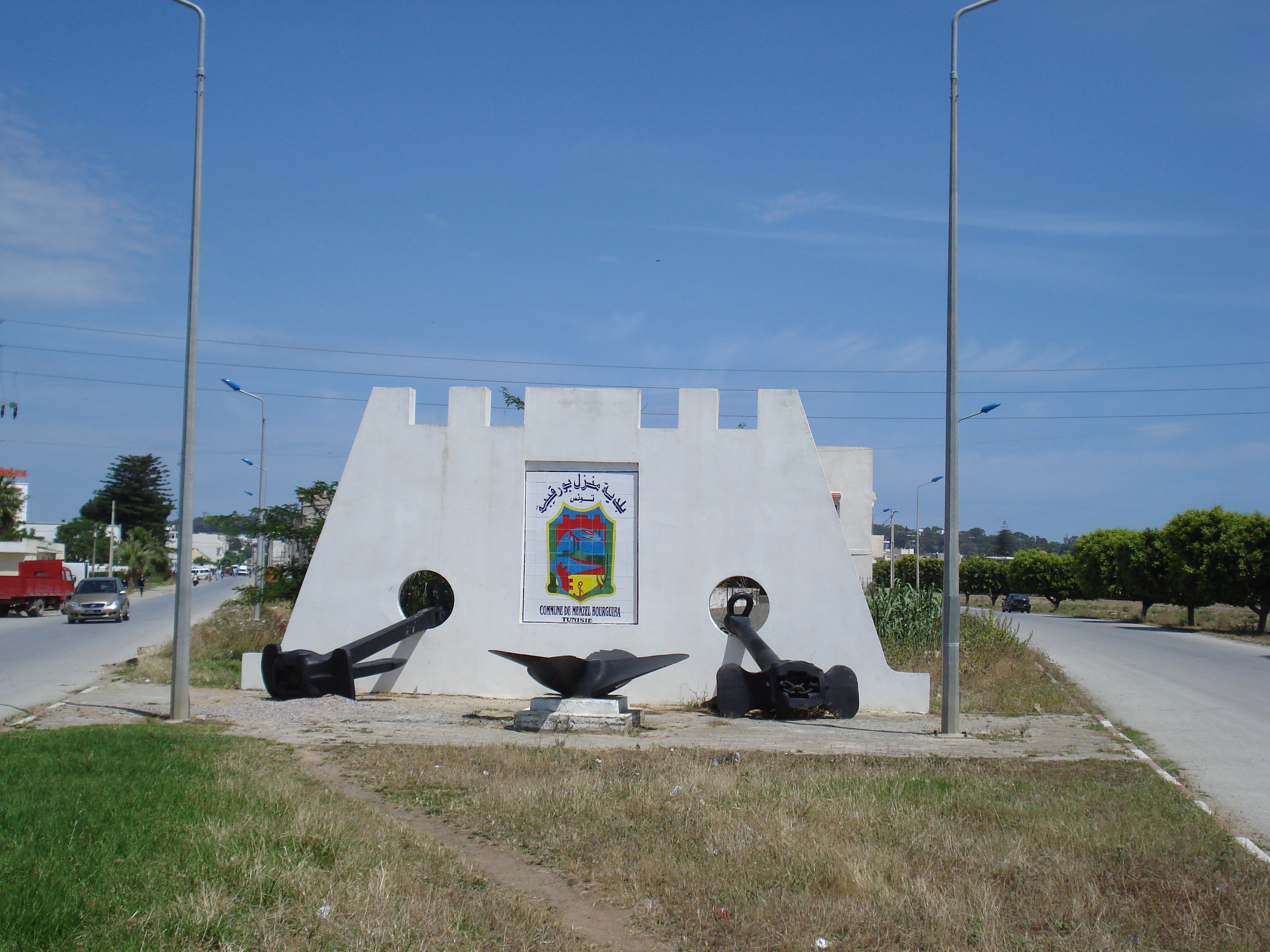

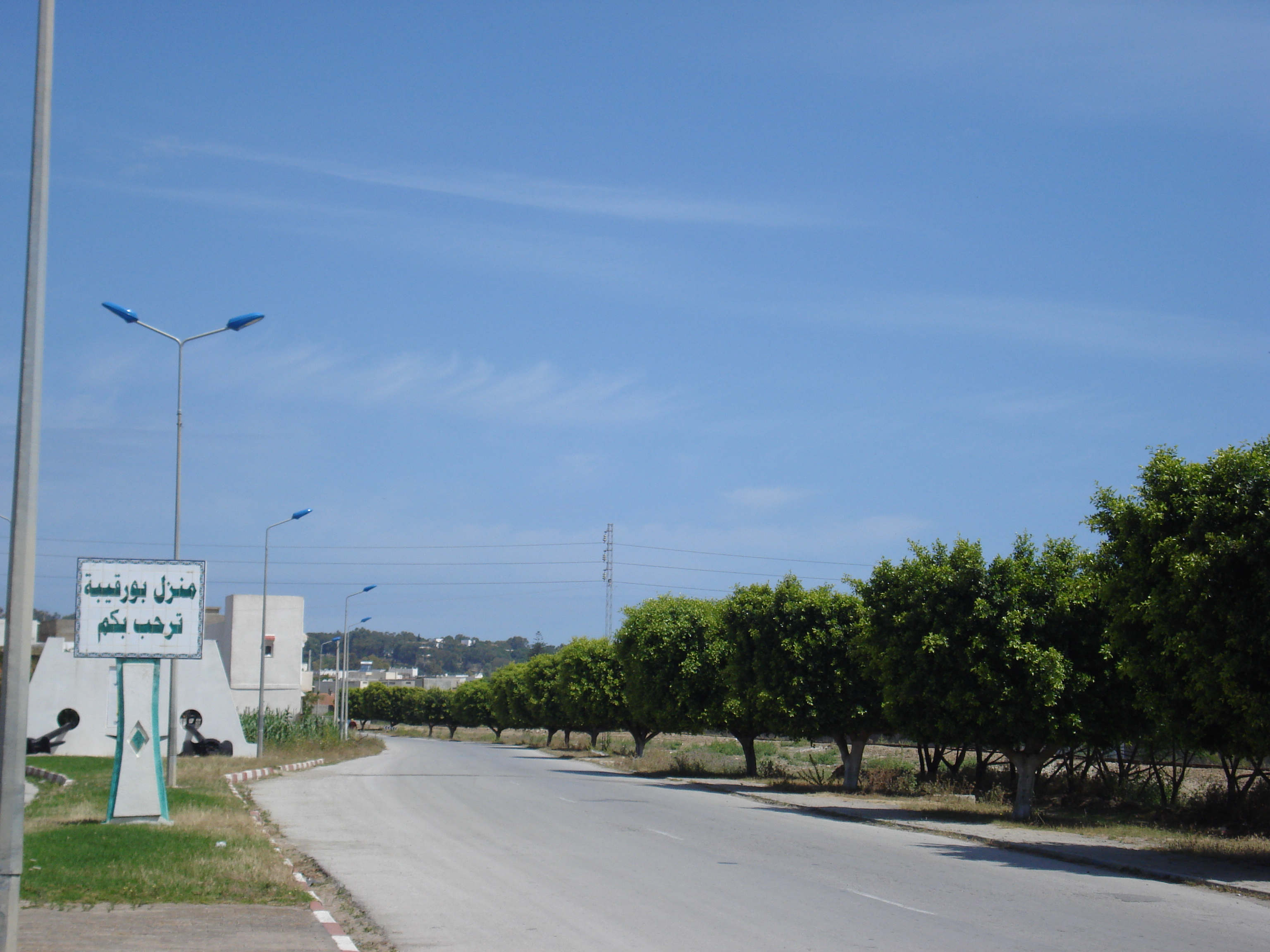

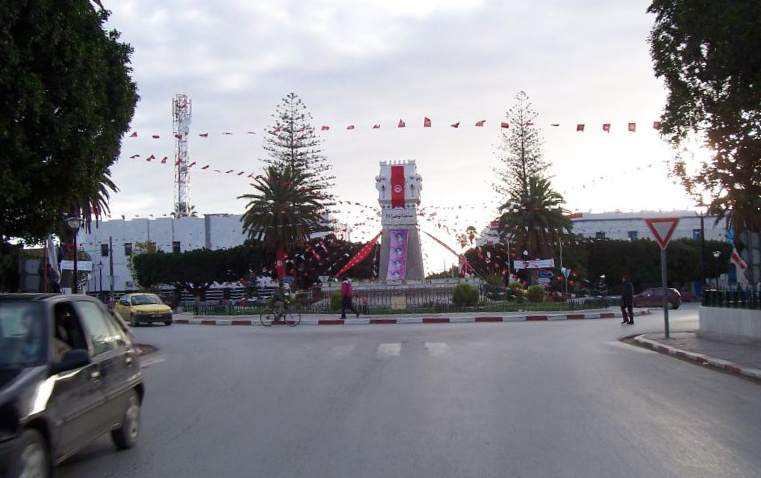

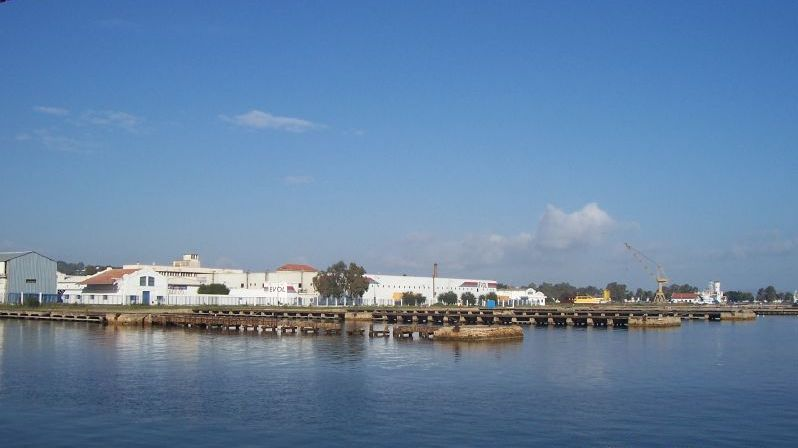

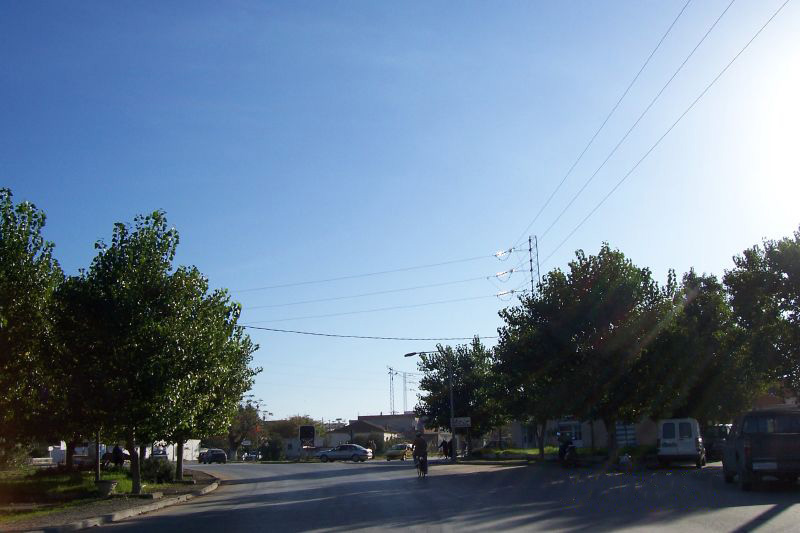
