= Bizerte Lake =

Lake in Bizerte Governorate, Tunisia

Coordinates: 37°11′18″N 9°51′14″E

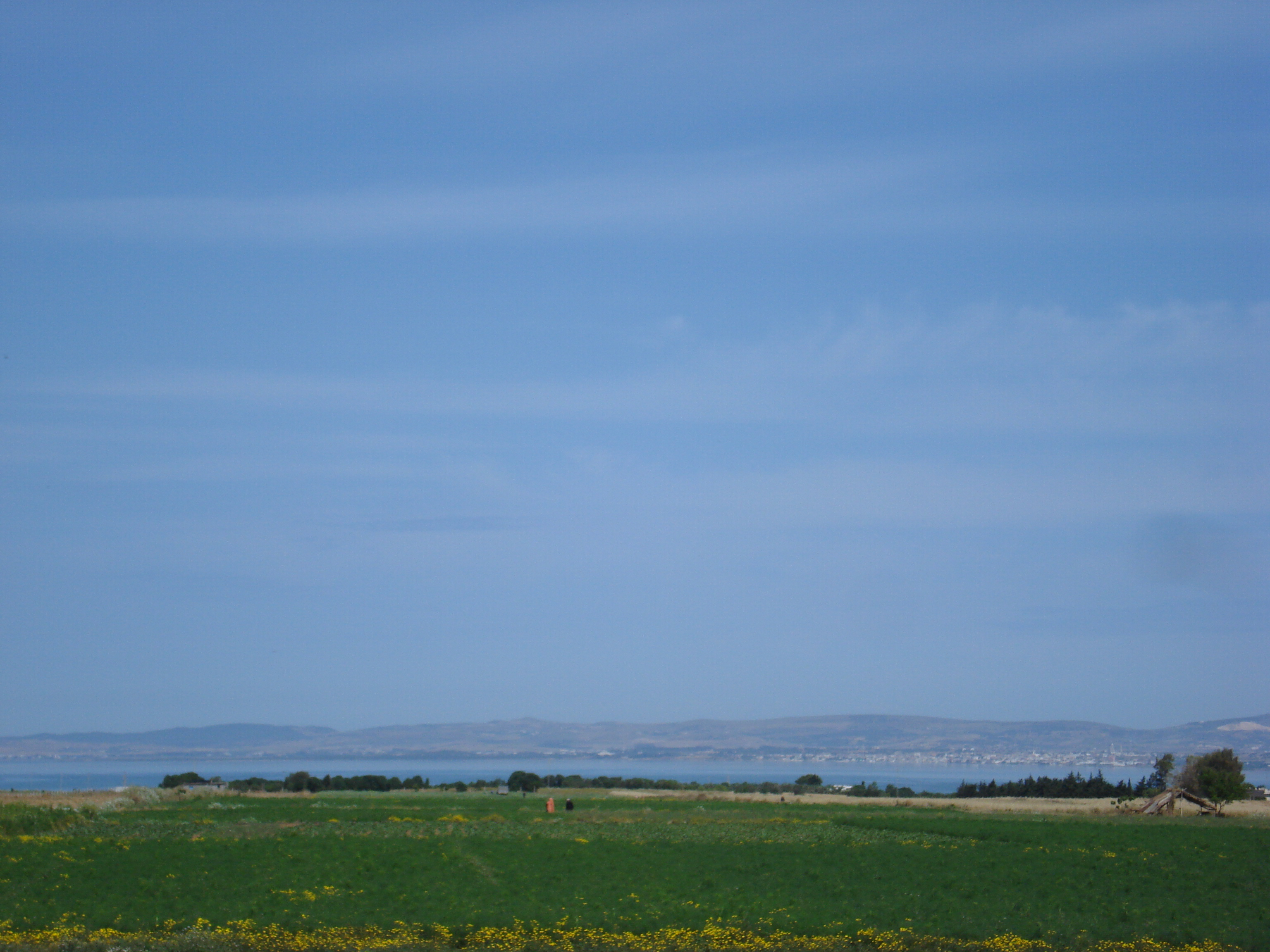
- Interactive map of Bizerte Lake
- Location: Bizerte Governorate
- Type: Lake
- Basin countries: Tunisia
- Surface area: 120 km^{2} (46 sq mi)
- Average depth: 12 m (39 ft)

Bizerte Lake is a lake located in northern Tunisia. It is fed by several rivers that originate from a vast basin. The basin has been significantly impacted in recent years by climatic fluctuations and increased economic activities, which are the primary factors influencing the flow of water into the lake.

As a result, the lake suffers from industrial pollution. Additionally, the lake serves as the economic port of the city of Bizerte. The lake covers an area of 120 square kilometers and has an average depth of 7 meters, with depths reaching up to 12 meters in some areas.

Lake Bizerte is home to two ports: the first is situated in the northeast, while the second is located in the southwest at Menzel Bourguiba, where ship repair docks are found. Additionally, the region is engaged in aquaculture activities, though these have developed slowly . In the northwest, there is a fish farming operation, while in the northeast, there is an active shellfish harvesting industry, producing approximately 120 tons of oysters and mussels annually.

The lake is situated within an urban and industrial environment. The cities of Bizerte, Menzel Bourguiba, Menzel Abderrahman, and Menzel Jemil, located along the lake's shores, collectively house over 200,000 residents. The region's economy is industrial based. These include a steel complex in Menzel Bourguiba, an oil refinery in Bizerte operated by the STIR company, a facility for processing used oils owned by the Sotulub company, and a cement plant (Bizerte Cement). Additionally, a free trade zone along the lake's shores.

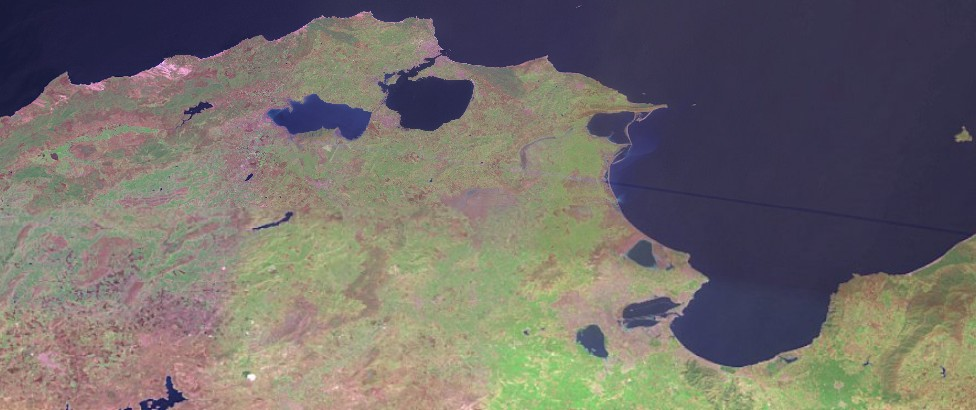
Satellite image showing Lake Bizerte (top center) in northeastern Tunisia
