= Bizerte =

City in Tunisia

Bizerte بنزرت Binzart Bizerta
- City
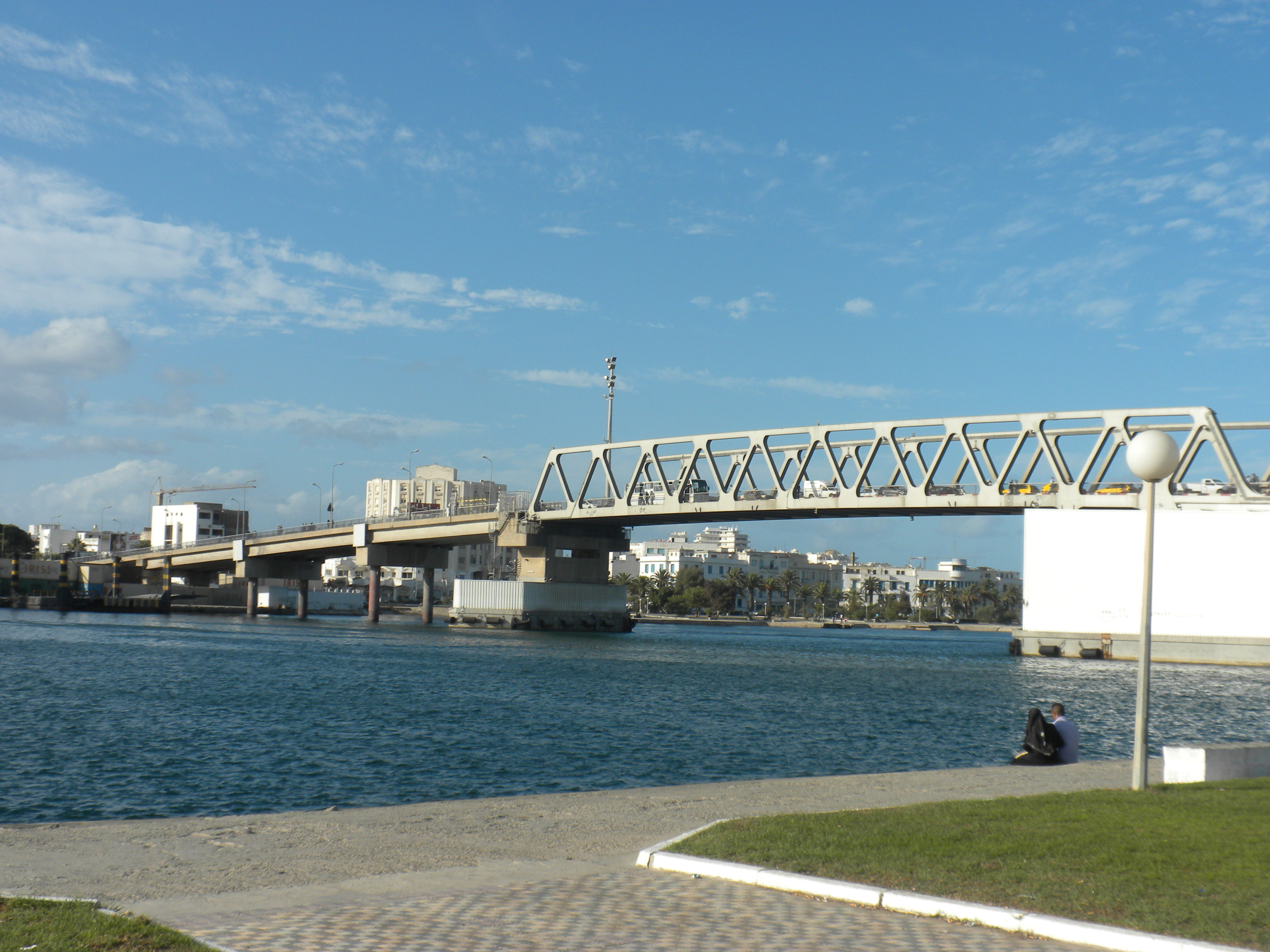
- From top to bottom, left to right: View of Bizerte from Ksiba, a Bizerte corniche, Old port of Bizerte, Bizerte Center, the local government building, Bizerte Bridge.

- Location in Tunisia Bizerte (Africa)
- Coordinates: 37°16′40″N 9°51′50″E
- Country: Tunisia
- Governorate: Bizerte Governorate
- Delegation(s): Bizerte North, Bizerte South

Government
  - Mayor: Kamel Ben Amara (Ennahda)

Area
  - Urban: 34 km^{2} (13 sq mi)
- Elevation: 5 m (16 ft)

Population (2022)
  - City: 162,053
  - Density: 3,363/km^{2} (8,710/sq mi)
  - Metro: 600,012
- Time zone: UTC+01:00 (CET)
- Postal code: 7000
- Area code: +216 (Tun) 72 (Bizerte)
- Website: www.commune-bizerte.gov.tn

Bizerte or Bizerta (/bɪˈzɜːrtə/ biz-UR-tə; Arabic: بنزرت, romanized: Binzart, Tunisian Arabic pronunciation: [bɪnˈzart]) is the capital and largest city of Bizerte Governorate in northern Tunisia. It is the northernmost city in Africa, located 65 km (40 mi) north of the capital Tunis. It is also known as the last town to remain under French control after the rest of the country won its independence from France. The city had 162,053 inhabitants in 2014.

== Names ==
The classical name of Bizerte, Hippo, is the latinization of a Punic name (Punic: 𐤏𐤐𐤅𐤍, ʿpwn), probably related to the word ûbôn, meaning "harbor". To distinguish it from Hippo Regius (the modern Annaba, in Algeria), the Greeks and Romans used several epithets. Scylax of Caryanda mentions it as Hippo Acra and Hippo Polis ("Hippo the City"). Polybius mentions it as Hippo Diarrhytus (Ancient Greek: Ἱππὼν διάρρυτος, Hippōn diárrhytos), "Hippo Divided-by-the-Water", in reference to the town's prominent canal. It also appears in Roman, Vandal, and Byzantine sources as Hippo Zarytus. Its Arabic name Binzart (بنزرت) and the French and English forms derived from it all represent phonetic developments of its ancient name.

== History ==
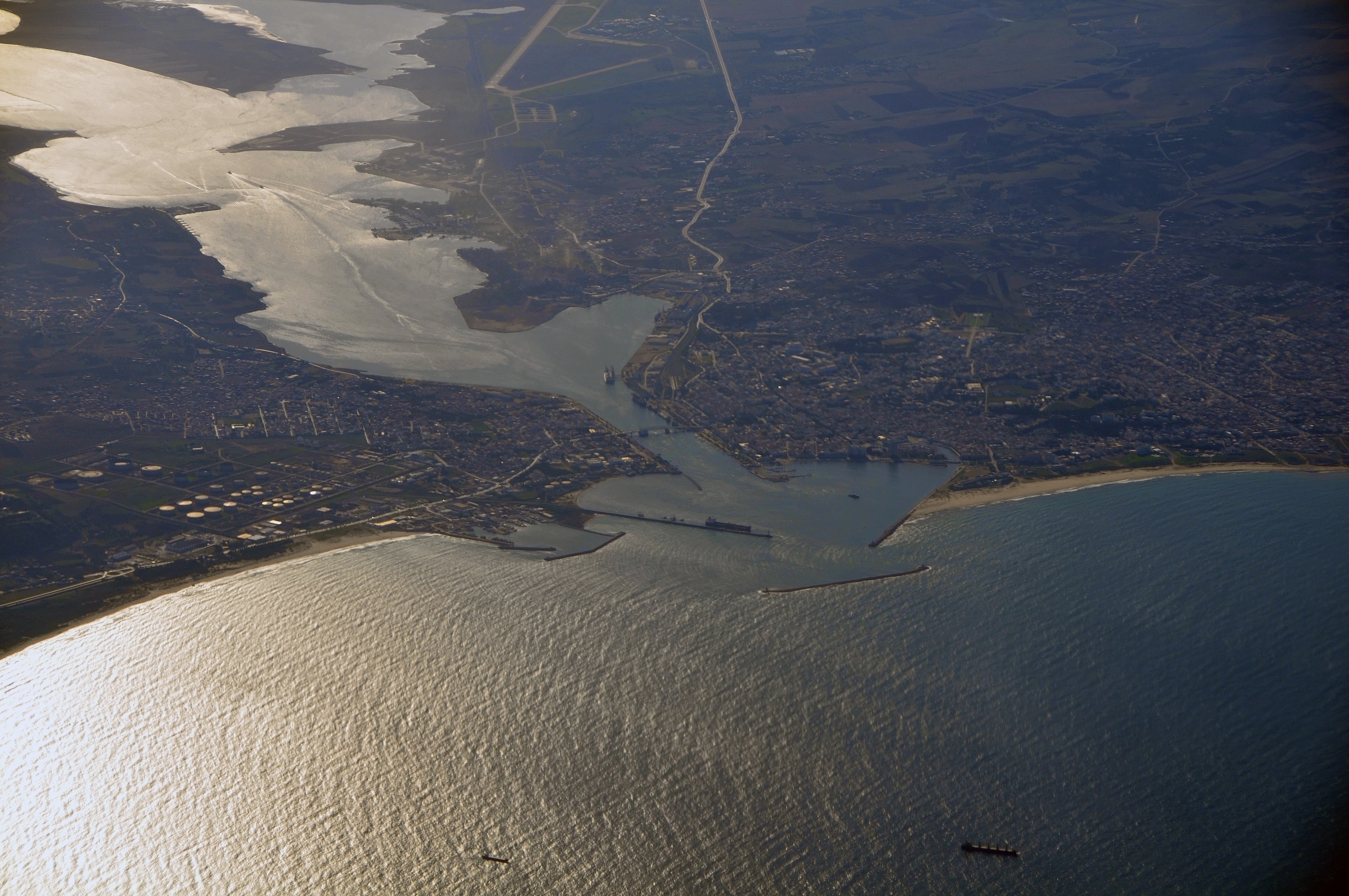
Aerial view of Bizerte (October 2008)

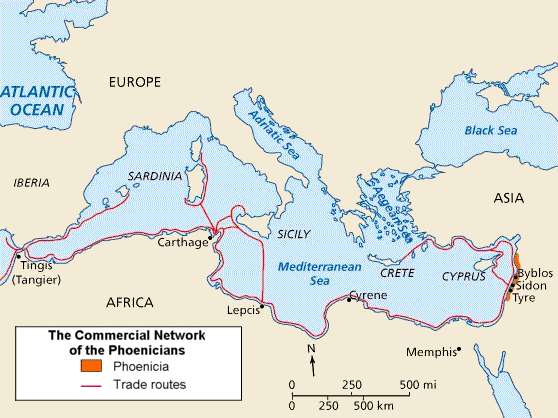
Phoenician trade routes 1200 BC – 539 BC

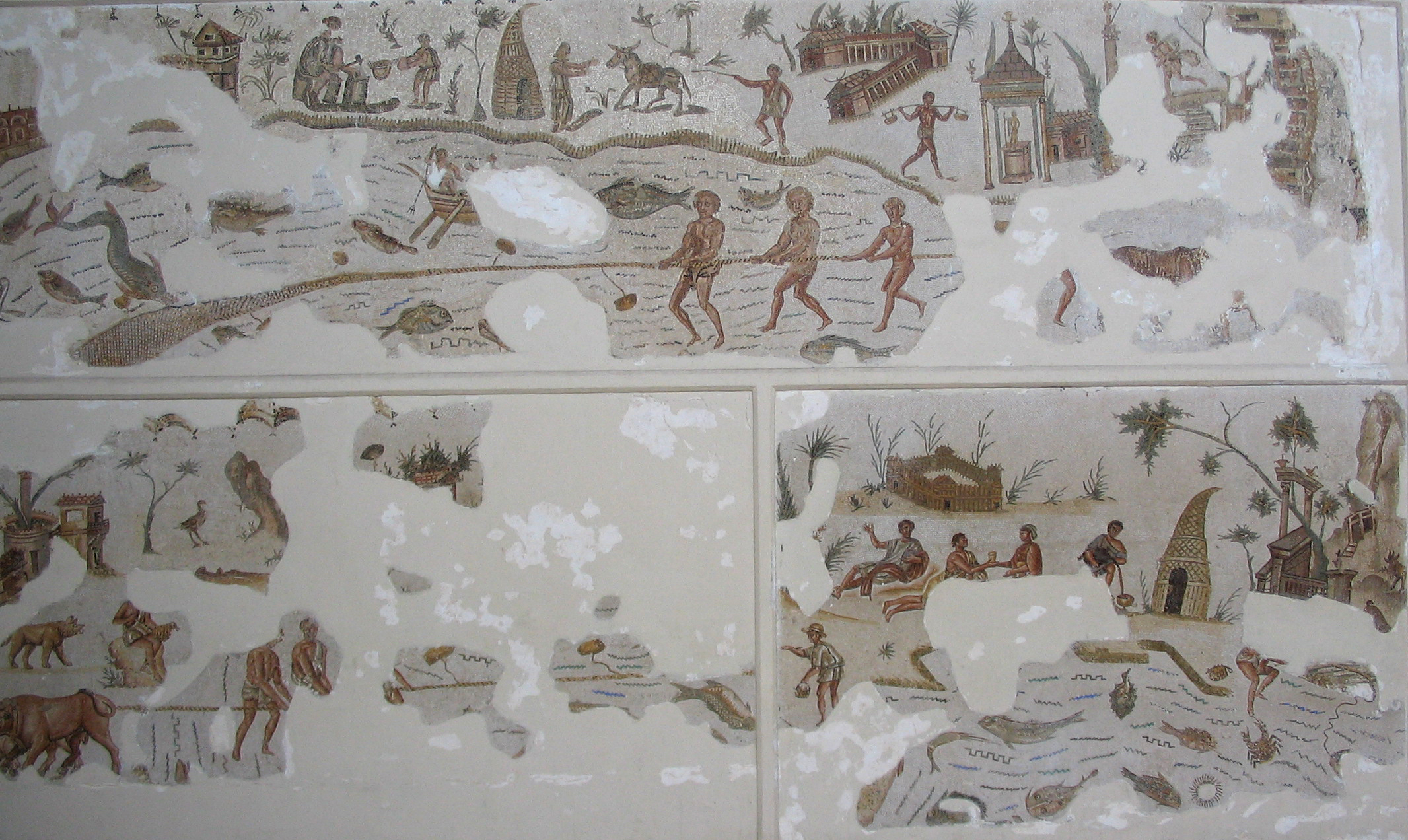
Roman mosaic with scenes of fishing and village life (Bardo National Museum, Tunisia)

=== Later history ===
Arab armies took Bizerte in 647 in their first invasion of the area, but the city reverted to control from Constantinople until the Byzantines were defeated and finally driven from North Africa in 695–98. The troops of Charles V of the Holy Roman Empire captured the city in 1535; the Turks took it in 1574. The city then became a corsair harbour associated to the Ottoman Tunisia and struggled against the French, the Venetians and the Spanish viceroyalty of Sicily.

With its occupation of Tunisia in 1881, France gained control of Bizerte and built a large naval harbour in the city.

In 1924, after the French government officially recognized the Soviet Union (USSR), the western military fleet of White Russia that had been kept in the port of Bizerte was returned to the Soviet government. The ships were never moved from the port and finally were sold there as scrap metal.

In March 1939, towards the end of the Spanish Civil War, Spanish Republican Navy Commander Miguel Buiza ordered the evacuation of the bulk of the Republican fleet. Three cruisers, eight destroyers and two submarines left Cartagena harbor and reached Bizerte, where the French authorities impounded them.

During the Second World War, the German and Italian armies occupied Bizerte until Allied troops defeated them on 7 May 1943. During the fighting between the Allied forces and the German Army, many of the city's inhabitants fled to the countryside or to Tunis. The city suffered significant damage during the battle.

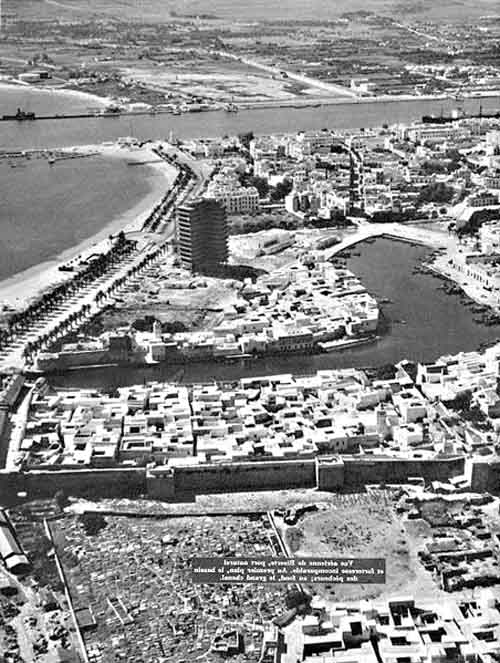
Aerial view of Bizerte in 1959

Due to Bizerte's strategic location on the Mediterranean, France retained control of the city and their naval base after Tunisian independence in 1956. In 1961 Tunisian forces blockaded the area of Bizerte and demanded French withdrawal. The face-off escalated when a French helicopter took off and drew fire. The French brought in reinforcements; when these were fired upon, France took decisive military action against the Tunisian forces. Using superior weapons and decisive force the French took Bizerte and Menzel Bourguiba. During three days in July 1961, 700 Tunisians died (1200 wounded); the French lost 24 dead (100 wounded).

Meetings at the UN Security Council and other international pressure moved France to agreement; the French military finally abandoned Bizerte on 15 October 1963.

== Geography ==
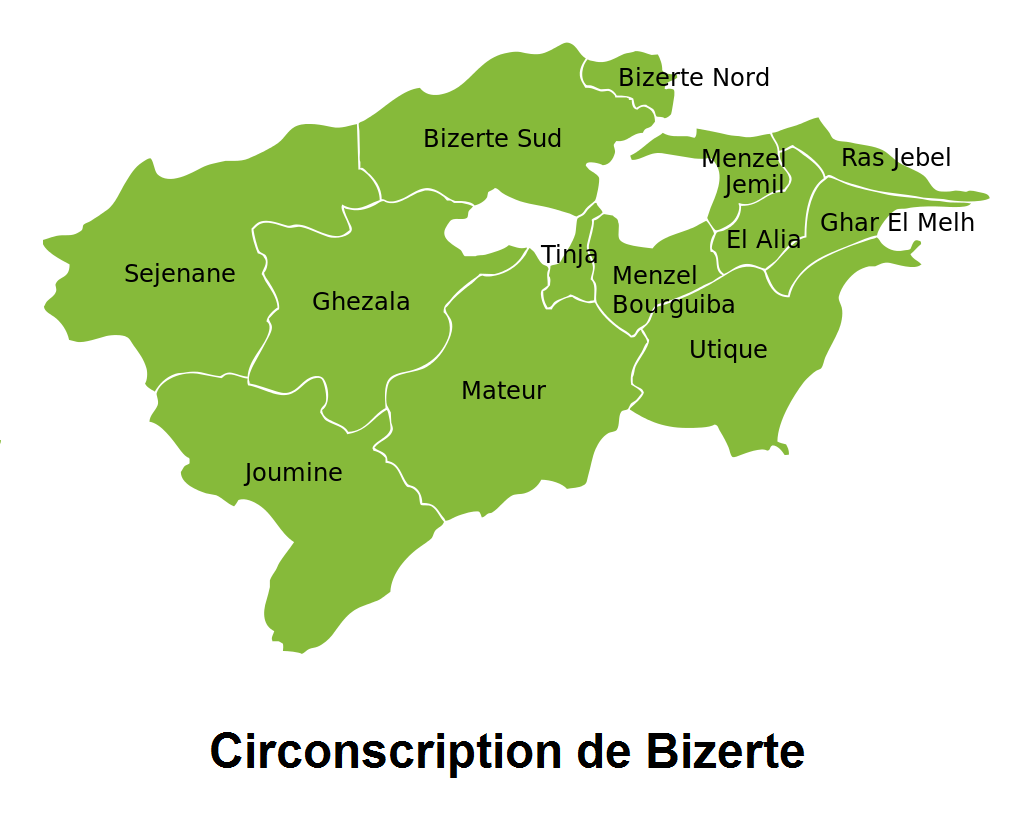
Circonsciption of Bizerte.

=== Location ===
Bizerte is on a section of widened inlet and east-facing coast of the north coast of Tunisia, 15 kilometres from Ras ben Sakka (the northernmost point in Africa on the Mediterranean Sea), 20 kilometers northeast of the Ichkeul lake (a World Heritage Site), 30 kilometers (19 miles) north of the archaeological site of Utica and 65 kilometers north of Tunis.

West of the city there are coastal hills forming an outcrop of the Tell Atlas with well-conserved woods and vantage points. Its associated beaches include Sidi Salem, La Grotte, Rasenjela, and Al Rimel. It is on a section of Mediterranean climate coastline, close to Sardinia and Sicily, as opposed to coasts in the south of the country which have a year-round dry desert climate.

The city is centered on the north shore of the canal of Bizerte linking the Mediterranean Sea to a tidal lake, the Lac de Bizerte which is larger than all parts of the town combined, to the immediate south. Built-up areas are in three directions:

- South-west along the widening canal with jetties at Pecherie and Jarrouba, the latter associated with Bizerte-Sidi Ahmed Air Base adjoining the opening of the lake and military/rescue heliport.
- North are Sidi Salam and Corniche. They are within meters of the coast and on coast-facing slopes of the Ain Berda, a range of hills toward Cap Blanc, a small headland in the Ain Damou Plage natural conservation area.
- Zarzouna, Menzel Jemil and Menzel Abderrahmane are on the south shore of the canal, formed by the locality of Zarzouna and the towns of Menzel Jemil and Menzel Abderrahmane, by a moveable bridge and both Menzels face the lake itself. The rest of the isthmus on which they stand is the gently rising Foret de Remel, reaching a high point east of its forest area at Cap Zebib.
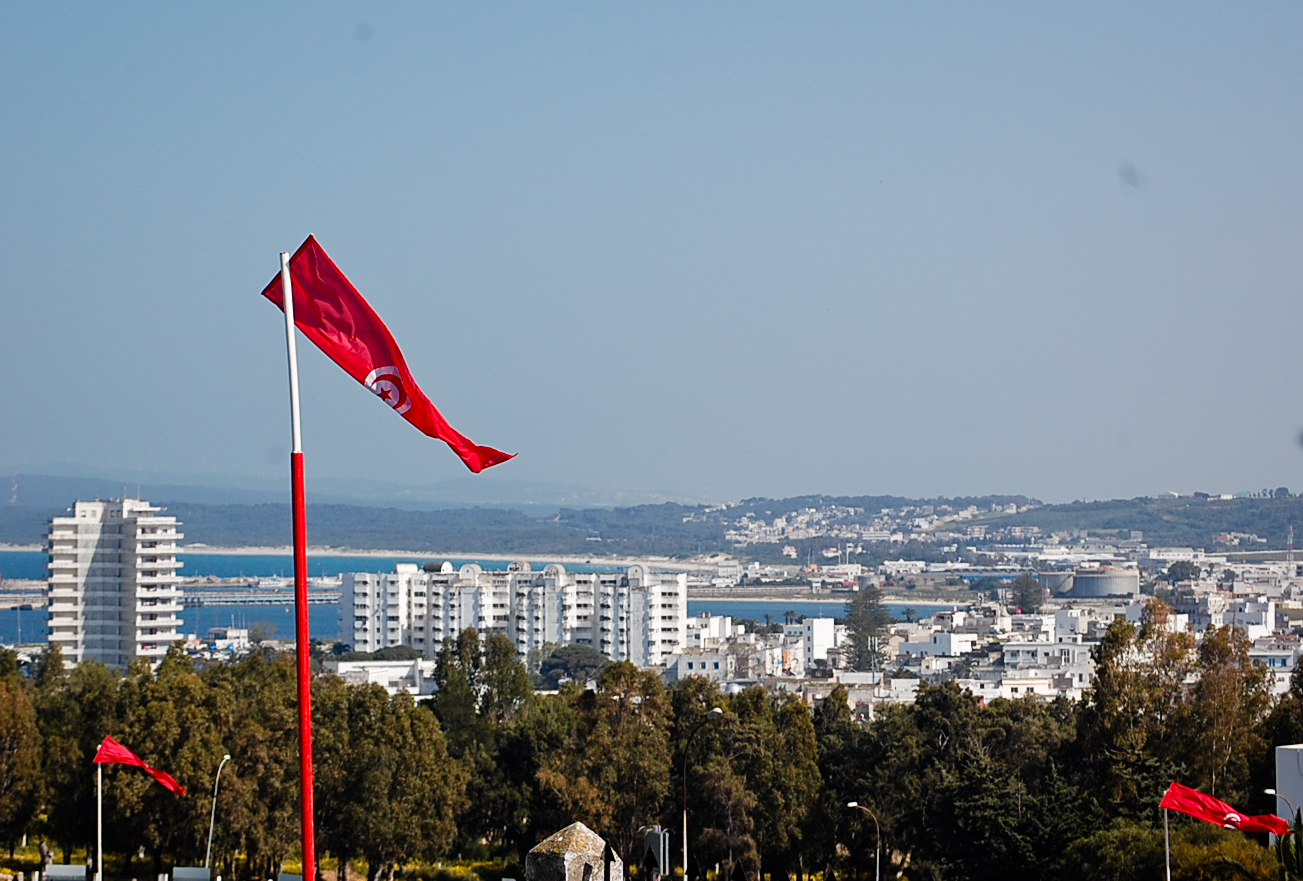
Aerial view of Bizerte

=== Transport ===
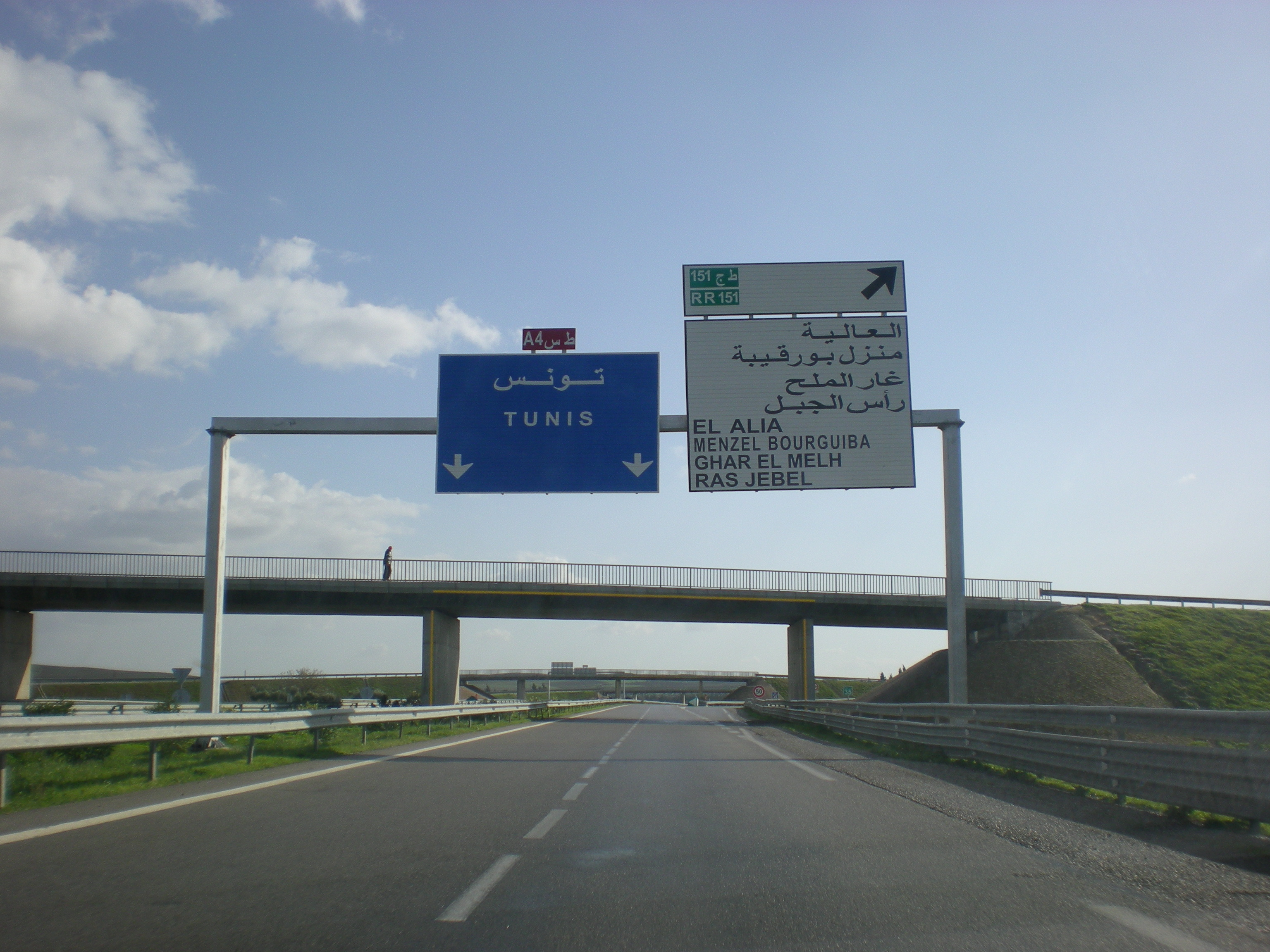
A4 motorway connecting Bizerte and Tunis

The bridge leads to the motorway A4 leading to Tunis–Carthage International Airport and the capital. On the town side the P11 passes semi-rural Louata, hugs Ichkeul Lake and branches into a western route, the P7, leading directly to Tabarka on the coast next to the Algerian border. The P11 leads south-west to Béja, a governorate center, in the foothills of the Tell Atlas, forks into several roads at Bou Salem, a small town in a broad fertile plain, and climbs to Firnanah passing two high-altitude lakes and also approaching the north-west border with Algeria.

=== Climate ===
Bizerte enjoys a hot-summer mediterranean climate, with mild, rainy winters and hot, dry summers. The Mediterranean Sea breeze makes summers cooler and more humid than in the interior of Tunisia.

The city's climate is unique by North African standards due to its geography. The rainy season typically lasts from October to March but can extend from September to May. Bizerte experiences an average of 110 rainy days per year greater than 0.1 mm, a relatively high number for its annual rainfall total of 653.2 mm despite its modest elevations. This is partly due to its direct exposure to westerly and north-westerly winds, which are very active throughout the year. These winds account for over 58% of all wind flows in winter and nearly 50% in summer.

During the summer, the climate is moderated by thermal sea breezes, making it more pleasant than many other coastal regions in North Africa. Sea breezes are observed on more than two-thirds of summer days, with their frequency peaking at over 80% in August. A typical summer sea breeze starts around 8:30 AM, reaches its maximum speed of up to 7 m/s around 3:00 PM, and subsides around 9:00 PM, lasting for about 13 hours. This effect is pronounced, with coastal neighborhoods like the Corniche being up to 2.5 °C cooler than inland areas where the official weather station of Sidi Ahmed is located. Forested areas, such as the Ennadhour forest, also benefit from this cooling effect. In contrast to the moderating breezes, the region also experiences hot, dry Sirocco wind events, which occur on average 7 to 8 days per year during the hot season.

Climate data for Bizerte (1991–2020, extremes 1901–present)
Month	Jan	Feb	Mar	Apr	May	Jun	Jul	Aug	Sep	Oct	Nov	Dec	Year
Record high °C (°F)	27.0 (80.6)	27.2 (81.0)	33.5 (92.3)	34.7 (94.5)	40.4 (104.7)	46.0 (114.8)	48.9 (120.0)	48.9 (120.0)	45.0 (113.0)	40.5 (104.9)	34.0 (93.2)	27.2 (81.0)	48.9 (120.0)
Mean daily maximum °C (°F)	16.0 (60.8)	16.2 (61.2)	18.4 (65.1)	21.0 (69.8)	25.1 (77.2)	29.5 (85.1)	32.4 (90.3)	33.2 (91.8)	29.7 (85.5)	26.1 (79.0)	20.9 (69.6)	17.1 (62.8)	23.8 (74.9)
Daily mean °C (°F)	11.5 (52.7)	11.5 (52.7)	13.4 (56.1)	15.7 (60.3)	19.4 (66.9)	23.5 (74.3)	26.4 (79.5)	27.2 (81.0)	24.5 (76.1)	21.0 (69.8)	16.2 (61.2)	12.7 (54.9)	18.6 (65.5)
Mean daily minimum °C (°F)	7.1 (44.8)	6.9 (44.4)	8.3 (46.9)	10.5 (50.9)	13.8 (56.8)	17.6 (63.7)	20.4 (68.7)	21.3 (70.3)	19.3 (66.7)	15.9 (60.6)	11.6 (52.9)	8.4 (47.1)	13.4 (56.2)
Record low °C (°F)	−4.2 (24.4)	−1.4 (29.5)	−0.4 (31.3)	1.0 (33.8)	3.1 (37.6)	8.0 (46.4)	8.0 (46.4)	10.0 (50.0)	8.9 (48.0)	4.9 (40.8)	0.0 (32.0)	−0.5 (31.1)	−4.2 (24.4)
Average precipitation mm (inches)	91.1 (3.59)	83.4 (3.28)	58.8 (2.31)	49.0 (1.93)	22.3 (0.88)	9.9 (0.39)	2.8 (0.11)	18.7 (0.74)	49.9 (1.96)	66.5 (2.62)	96.2 (3.79)	104.6 (4.12)	653.2 (25.72)
Average precipitation days (≥ 1.0 mm)	10.9	9.6	7.3	6.5	3.8	1.4	0.4	1.6	5.2	6.6	10.3	11.6	75.2
Average relative humidity (%)	83	80	78	78	75	70	68	69	75	78	83	83	77
Mean monthly sunshine hours	161.3	181.4	227.8	252.6	312.2	345.1	379.8	339.5	266.3	226.2	177.4	157.3	3,026.9
Mean daily sunshine hours	4.6	5.8	7.0	7.9	9.8	11.0	12.4	11.5	8.9	6.7	5.1	4.3	7.9
Percentage possible sunshine	53	60	62	64	71	78	85	81	72	66	58	53	68
Source 1: Institut National de la Météorologie (extremes 1950–2021, sun 1981-2010) (Note: The Station ID for Bizerte is 11414111.)
Source 2: Deutscher Wetterdienst (extremes 1901–1992) OGIMET Arab Meteorology Book (humidity and daily sun),NOAA

Bizerte mean sea temperature
Jan	Feb	Mar	Apr	May	Jun	Jul	Aug	Sep	Oct	Nov	Dec
14.6 °C (58.3 °F)	14.0 °C (57.2 °F)	14.3 °C (57.7 °F)	15.1 °C (59.2 °F)	17.2 °C (63.0 °F)	19.9 °C (67.8 °F)	23.4 °C (74.1 °F)	24.9 °C (76.8 °F)	23.8 °C (74.8 °F)	21.7 °C (71.1 °F)	18.8 °C (65.8 °F)	16.2 °C (61.2 °F)

== Demography ==
In 2020 the estimated population of Bizerte was 182,662, with a density of 392.4/km^{2}.

=== Population structure ===
In 2014 the Males represented 50.3% of the population and the Females 49.7%. The population aged 60 years and over represented 12.4% and the urban population represented 60.4% of the population.

=== Demographic evolution ===
Demographic evolution of Bizerte and its delegations
	2004	2014	2020
Bizerte	144 889	167 759	182 622
Bizerte Nord	75 234	87 307	95 268
Bizerte Sud	45 227	55 659	62 426
Zarzouna	24 428	24 793	24 929
Source : Citypopulation.de

== Architecture and landscape ==
=== Vieux Port ===
Le vieux port (the old port) of Bizerte is a port with a small pool surrounded by white houses, cafes and large boats in bright colors. It is an actively used for fishing. Architecturally, it resembles a traditional Spanish or Provençal port.

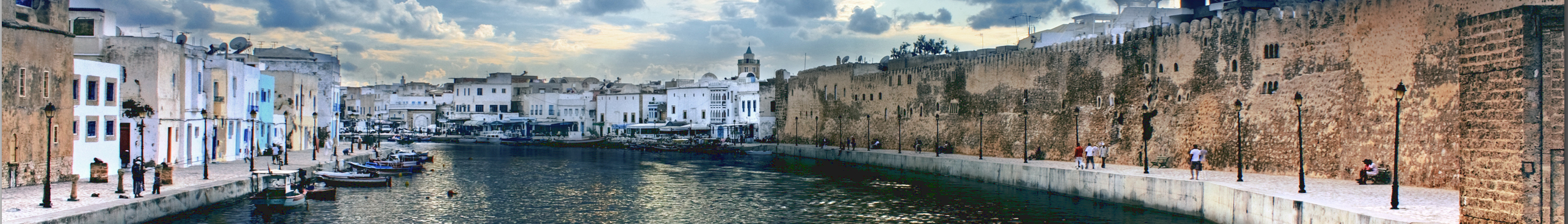
Vieux Port of Bizerte

=== Medina ===
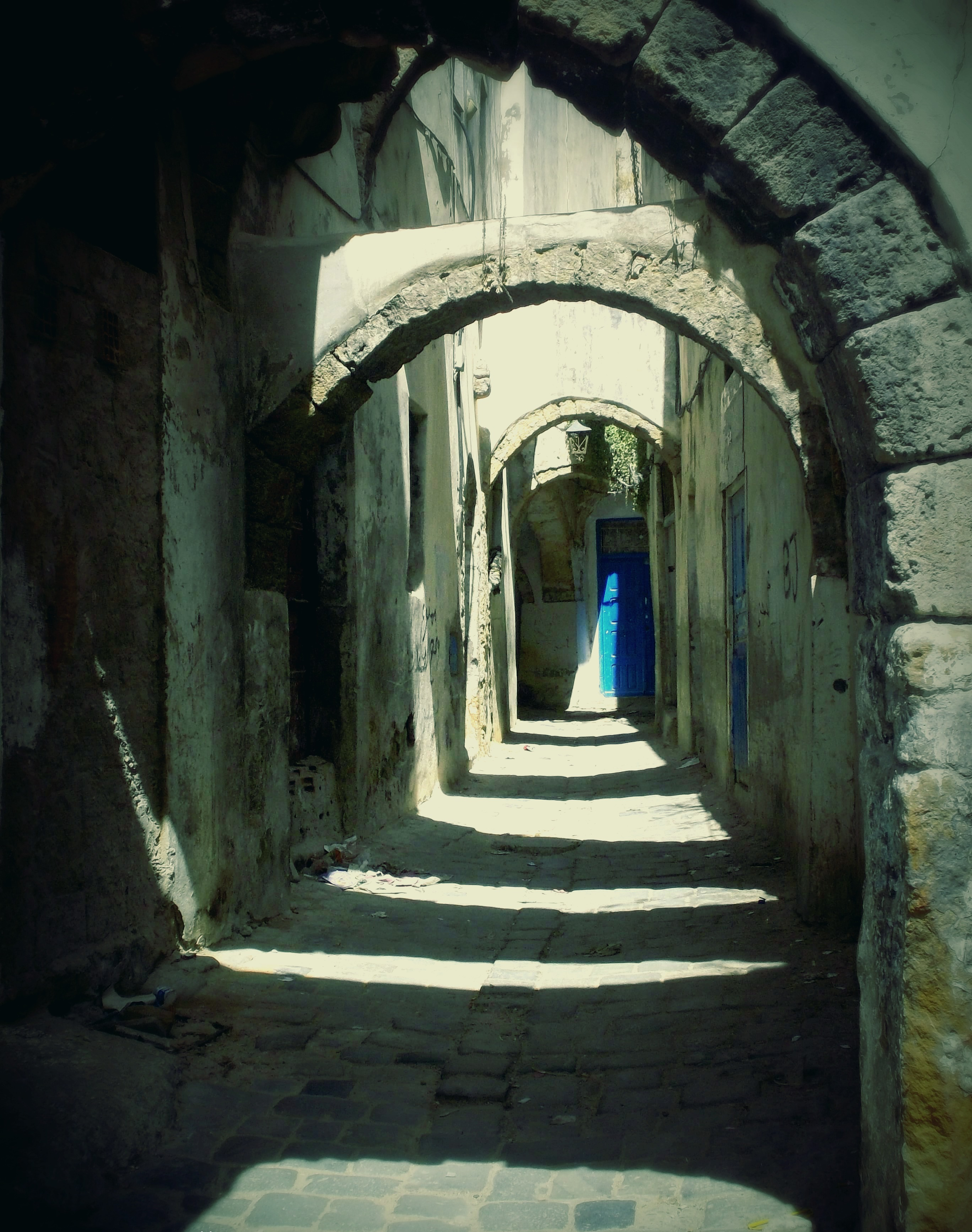
The Medina of Bizerte.

The medina corresponds to the old town of Bizerte. It stretches north of the modern city, above Avenue Bourguiba, and runs along the old port to the Kasbah (the fortress). Once protected by a rampart facing inland, it was brought down during the French protectorate to assert its power over the city. The medina is a sort of labyrinth of narrow streets that intersect in all directions. In the souks, the smells change from one alley to another, according to the shops of craftsmen and their products. The names of the streets correspond to the old corporations present here: rue des armuriers, rue des carpenters, weavers, jewelers ... In narrow stalls you can see a craftsman at work. The tall octagonal-shaped minaret of the Great Mosque (dating from the 17th century) rises above the medina. At his side, the zaouïa of Sidi Mokhtar Dey, boss of Bizerte.

The Medina of Bizerte is an old town that surrounds the picturesque Old Port district. It is a bustling center of traditional crafts. In its winding labyrinth of narrow alleys and covered souks are the workshops of metalworkers and carpenters, and butchers and grocery stores. The streets are named after the artisans who live and work there: the blacksmiths on rue des Forgerons, the gunsmiths on rue des Armuriers, carpenters on rue des Menuisiers and butchers on rue des bouchers.

=== Kasbah ===
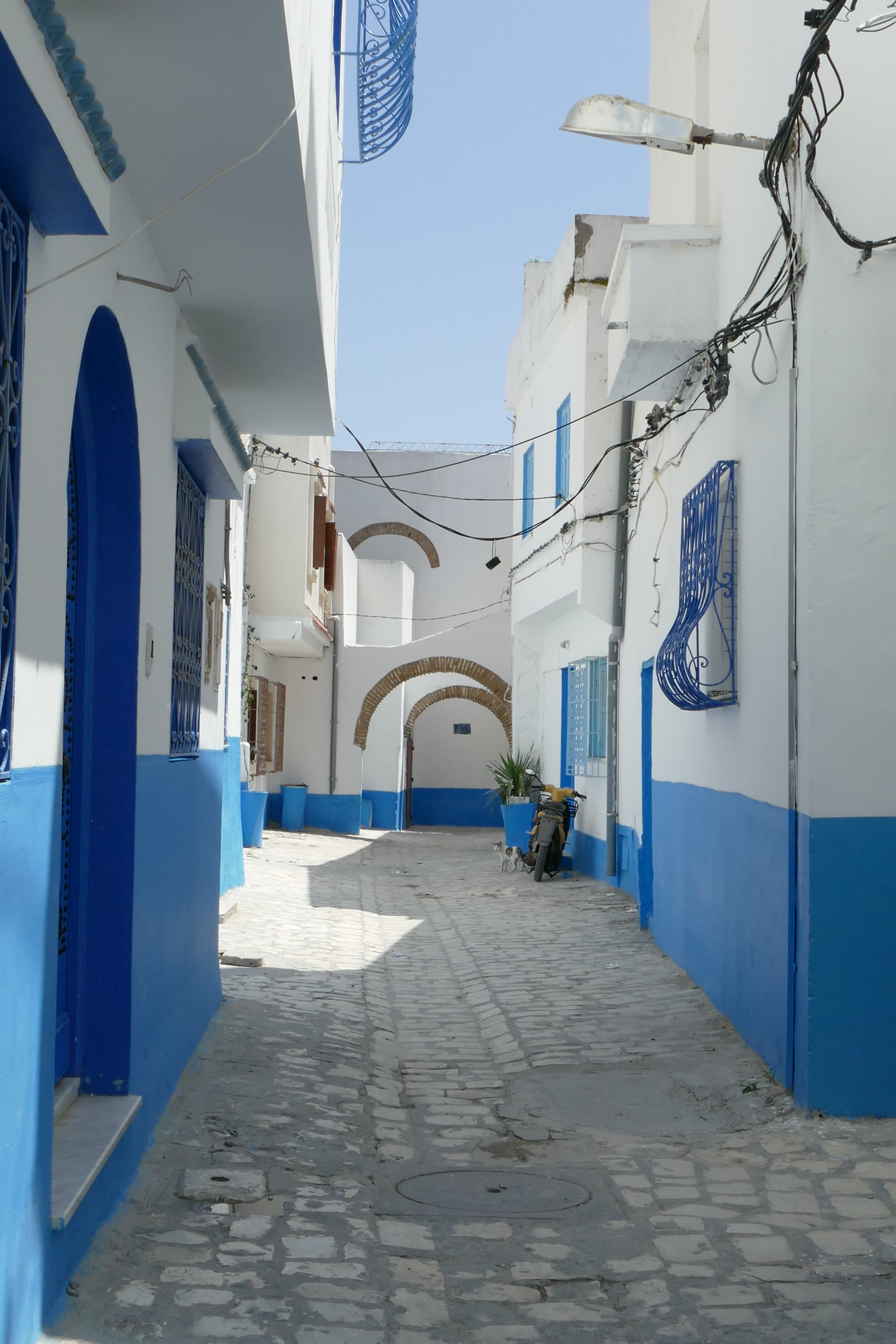
View of The Kasbah of Bizerte.

The Kasbah is located in north of the old port, it has a single entrance from the West side. It has small dimensions: approximately 175m by 120m and has 8 towers and a walkway. It was built in the 17th century. On the other side of the canal, the kasbah rises its ramparts above the medina: it is accessed for the beautiful view of the city, the port, the lake and the sea. The origins of this fortress go back to the time of the Byzantine occupation: rectangular in shape, a tower occupies each corner. The entrance to the kasbah is a narrow arched passageway designed to slow down any invaders attempting to enter it at the time. The interior of the fortress is a maze of small alleys lined with houses. At the foot of the north-west rampart, the market place comes alive with the cry of the merchants, and the stalls give the impression of an organized jumble. Beyond stretches the Andalusian quarter, where the Moors from Spain took refuge in the 17th century. Further along, linked by a rampart of the kasbah, we can see the silhouette of the fort of Spain, which overlooks Bizerte at an altitude of about 40 meters on a height to the north. This fort dates from 1573, built during the Turkish domination by the Pasha of Algiers. It is built so as to be able to face the artillery, composed of thirteen sides with re-entrant angles. Now far from any threat, the fort has since been redeveloped into an open-air theater, which notably hosts the Bizerte International Festival (music, dance, film).

== Education ==
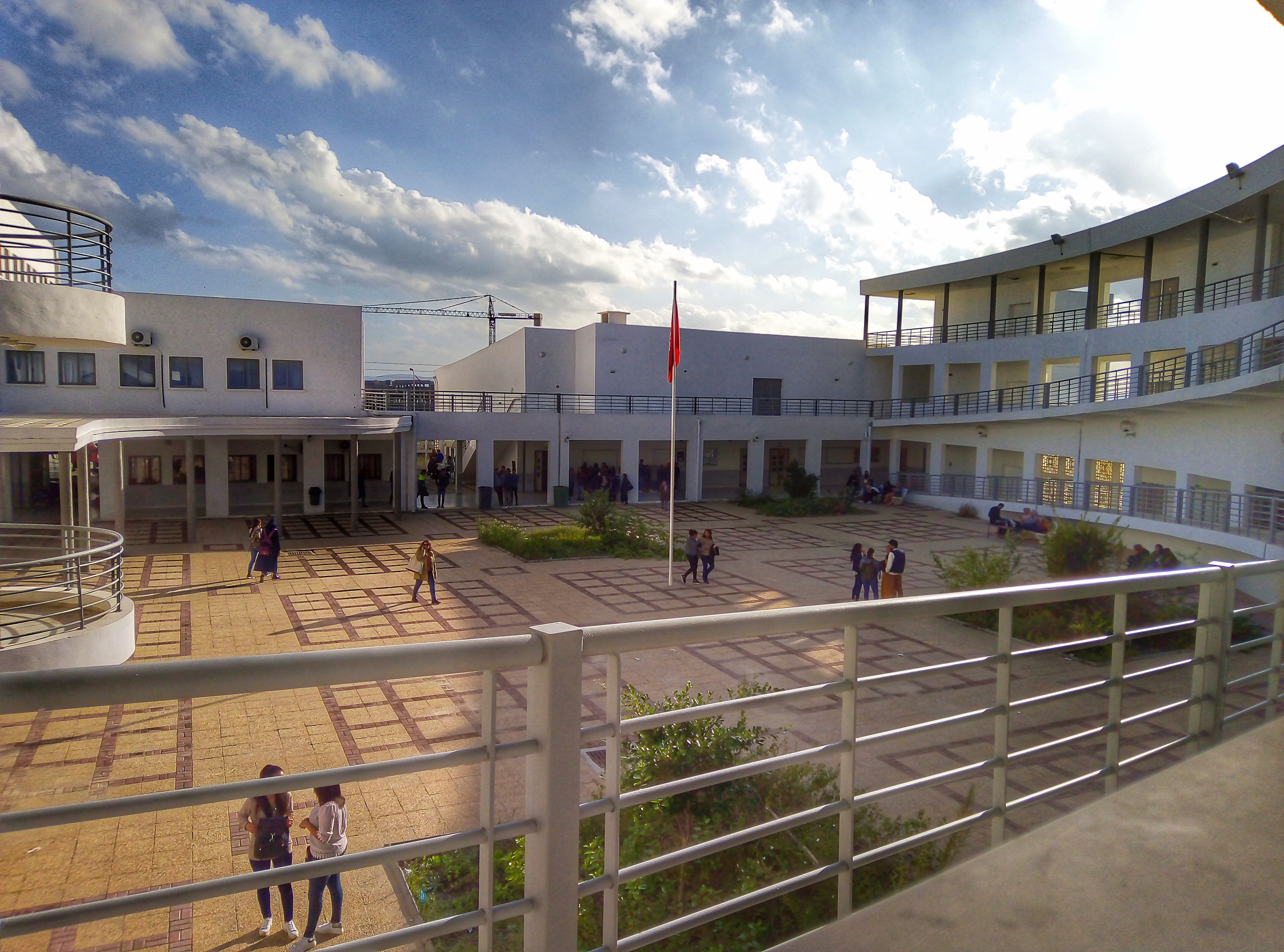
Schoolyard of the ISG

Bizerte is served by the ISG (Institut Supérieur de Gestion)

== Health ==
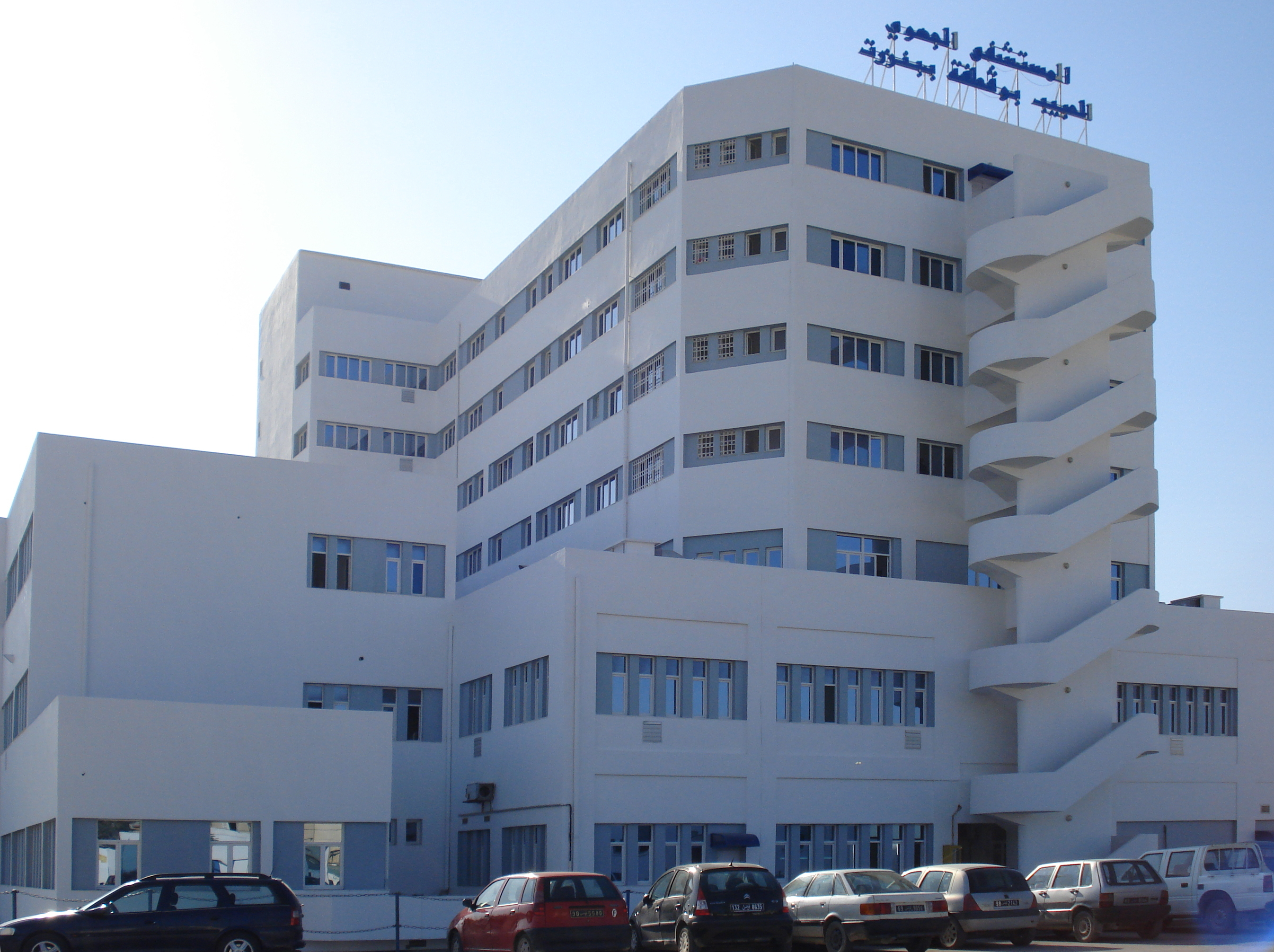
Hospital of Habib Bougata

There is in Bizerte a large hospital Hôpital Régional de Bizerte, one of the biggest in the region.

== Economy ==
Bizerte's economy is very diverse. There are several military bases and year-round tourism. As a tourist centre the region is however not as popular as the eastern coast of Tunisia. There is manufacturing (textile, auto parts, cookware), fishing, fruits and vegetables, and wheat.

== Miscellaneous ==
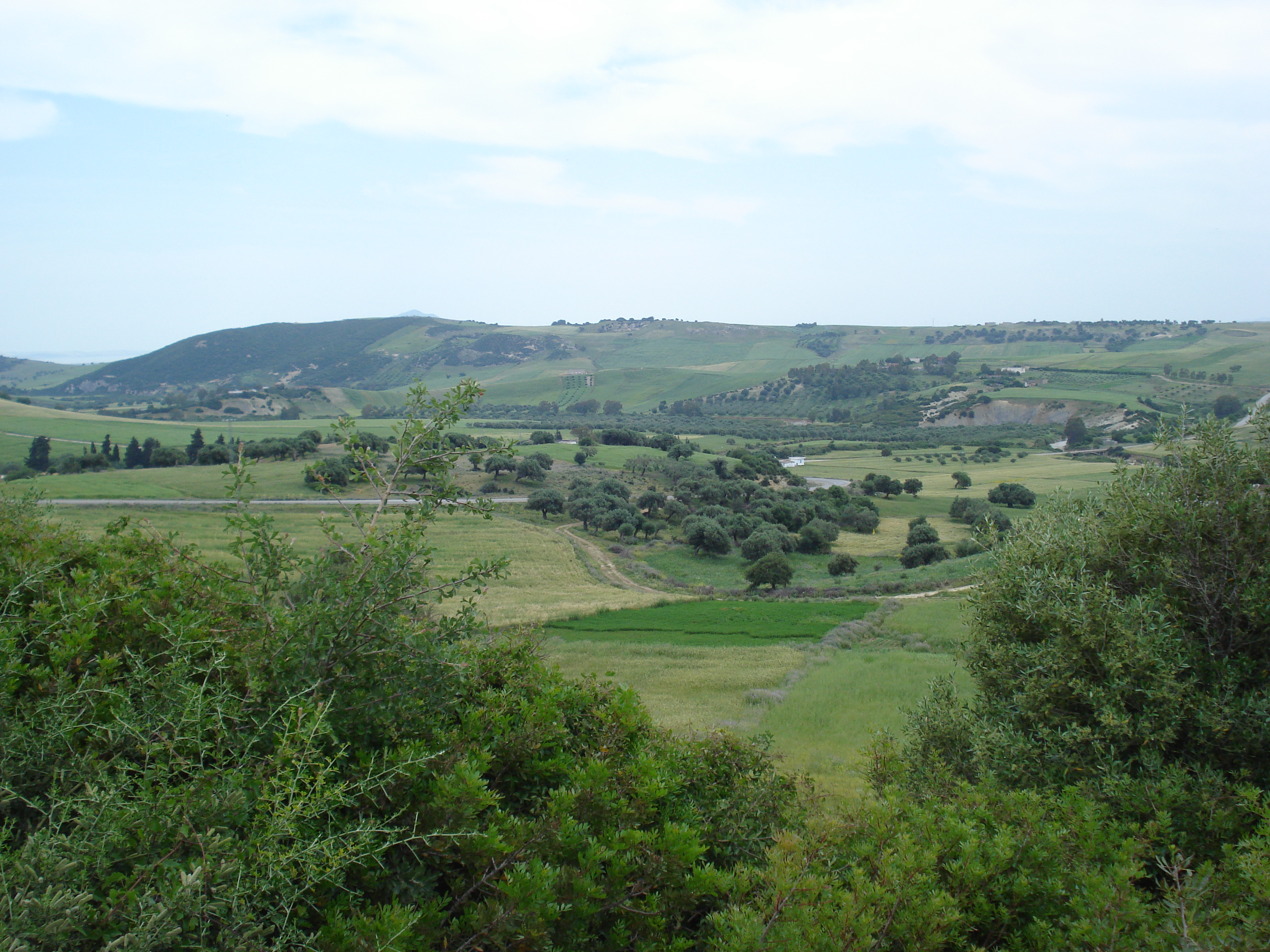
Jebel Aïn Chouna

- The port of Bizerte is being developed into a significant Mediterranean yachting marina that was scheduled to open in May 2012. The superyacht section of the marina will be called Goga Superyacht Marina, and will have berths for yachts of up to 110m in length. It is expected that this will give a significant boost to the local economy as the yacht owners and also the hundreds of professional crew will become year-round consumers. The service industries supplying the yachts will gradually develop and bring additional employment.
- The actor Abdelmajid Lakhal was born in Bizerte.
- The Teapacks song "Lo haya lano klum" is about how bandleader Kobi Oz' family were expelled from Bizerte by the Nazis in 1942.

== Titular see ==
Hippo Diarrhytus is a titular see of the Roman Catholic Church. In 1989–2002 it was held by Tadeusz Kondrusiewicz, then by Jose Paala Salazar, O.P. in 2002–2004 and by Manfred Grothe since 14 October 2004. The city and see of Hippo Diarrhytus should not be confused with those of Hippo Regius where Saint Augustine of Hippo was the bishop.

== Serbian Army in Bizerte 1915–1919 ==
=== Army ===
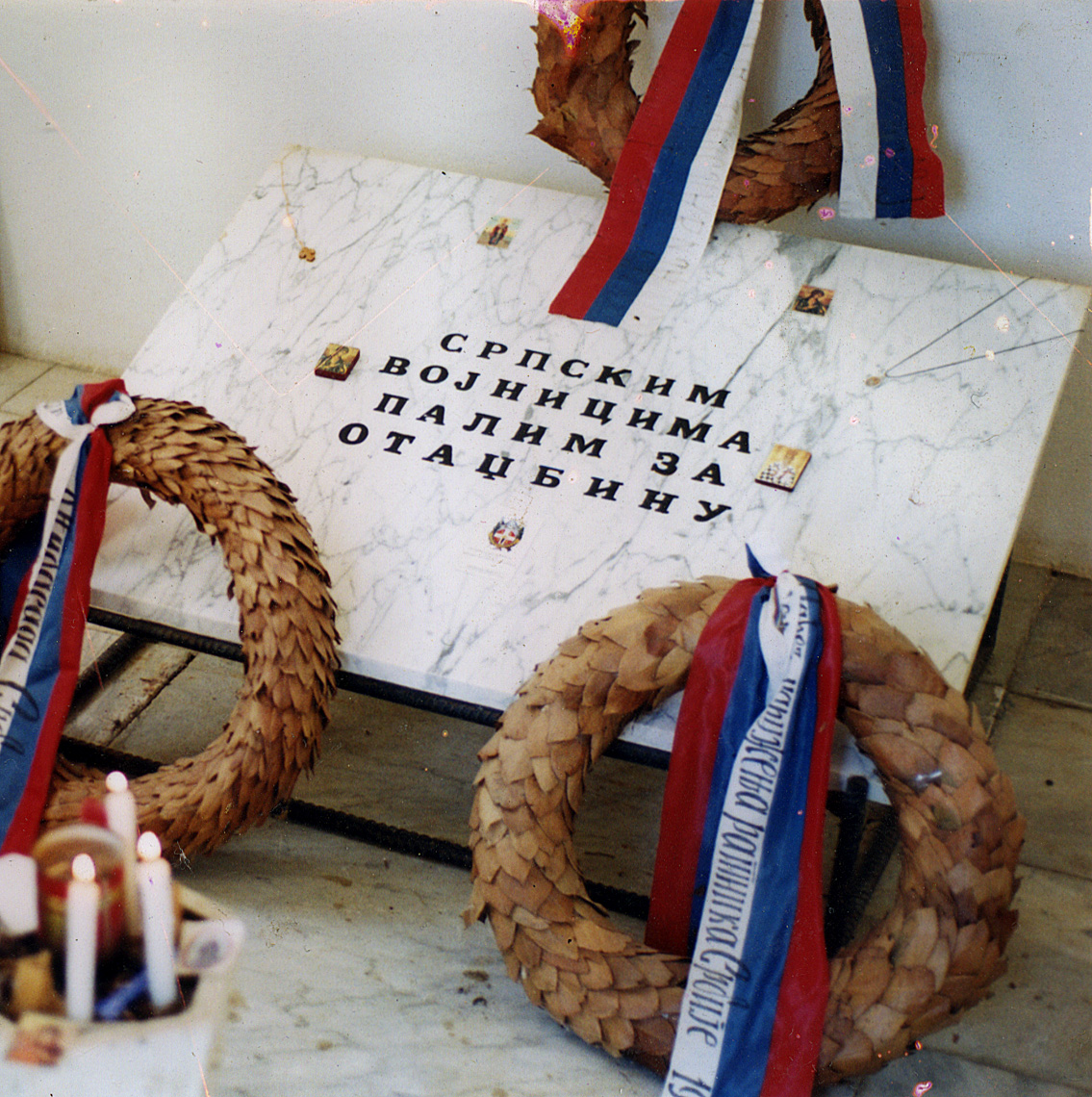
Serbian military cemetery in Bizerte

After the Serbian army's retreat through Albania in 1915, during World War I, part of the army was transported by the French navy to their naval base in Bizerte. Serbian soldiers, and a small number of civilians, arrived in Bizerte on three occasions. In December 1915 and early 1916, after the Albanian Golgotha, then later in 1916 after the first clashes on the Salonica front in Greece and in the early 1917 when Serbian volunteers began to gather in Bizerte. During the entire war, the soldiers were transported to the Salonica front while the wounded were transported back to Tunisia. It is estimated that over 60,000 Serbian soldiers passed through the camp. The training of the volunteers was organized in the camp, education of the disabled but also the cultural events. French-Serbian dictionary was compiled and published by Veselin Čajkanović in Bizerte. Out of 7,000 copies, 5,000 and 1,000 were distributed to Serbian and French soldiers, respectively, while the remaining 1,000 copies were sold, with money being donated to the war invalids.

Serbian wounded soldiers were originally placed in the Lambert barrack. Few days later they were relocated to the 5 km (3.1 mi) away camp Lazouaz. Almost 200 barracks were built in the camp complex. Citizens of Bizerte, French soldiers and administration were highly obliging to the Serbs, especially the Bizerte governor, admiral Émile Guépratte. He was involved in the care of the soldiers on daily basis and organized ceremonial greetings for every ship upon arrival. The last Serbian soldiers left Bizerte on 18 August 1919. Admiral Guépratte directly disobeyed the order from the French High Command by which he was ordered to dislocate Serbs into the Sahara's hinterland. When Guépratte visited Belgrade for the first time in 1930, he was awaited by the crowd which carried the admiral on their shoulders from the Belgrade Main railway station to the Slavija Square. The street where the admiral was carried, today bears his name (Serbian: Улица адмирала Гепрата, lit. 'Admiral Guépratte Street').

=== Hospitals ===
In Northern Africa, Serbian wounded soldiers were treated in the hospitals in Bizerte, Tunis, Sousse, Sidi Abdala, Algiers, Oran and Annaba. From December 1915 to August 1919, a total of 41,153 Serbian soldiers were treated. In Tunisian hospitals, 833 soldiers died (typhus, malaria, wounds, hunger and frostbites). In Sidi Abdala, local population helped the Serbs providing food, medicines and nurture. A total of 1,722 people died there.

=== Cemeteries ===
The dead in Bizerte, Sousse and Tunis were buried in the memorial ossuary on the Christian cemetery in Bizerte. Those who died in Sidi Abdala were interred on the joint French-Serbian military cemetery. Those two cemeteries are the largest of all in Northern Africa where Serbian soldiers were buried – a total of 24 cemeteries in Tunisia, Algeria and Morocco, with 3,005 buried soldiers.

== Notable residents ==
- Georges Madon (1892–1924), ace pilot
- Claude Pujade-Renaud (born 1932), writer
- Maurice Poli (born 1933), actor
- Abdelmajid Lakhal (1939–2014), actor and theatre director
- Nikita Mandryka (1940–2021), cartoonist
- Lionel Duroy (born 1949), writer
- Pierre Cohen (born 1950), politician
- Jean-Marc Luisada (born 1958), pianist
- Mondher Kebaier (born 1970), football coach
- Hassen Bejaoui, (born 1975), former footballer
- Malek Jaziri (born 1984), tennis player
- Hamdi Harbaoui (born 1985), footballer
- Souheïl Ben Radhia (born 1985), footballer
- Farouk Ben Mustapha (born 1989), footballer
- Hamza Mathlouthi (born 1992), footballer
- Bilel Saidani (born 1993), footballer

== International relations ==
=== Sister cities ===
Bizerte is twinned with:

- Tangiers, Morocco, since 1976
- Port Said, Egypt, since 1977
- Annaba, Algeria, since 1985
- Kalamata, Greece, since 1997
- Palermo, Italy, since 2005
- Saint Petersburg, Russia, since 2013
- Rostock, Germany, since 2016

=== Cooperation agreement ===
- Clermont-Ferrand, France, (a program of rehabilitation of historic centers)
- Dunkerque, France,

== Gallery ==
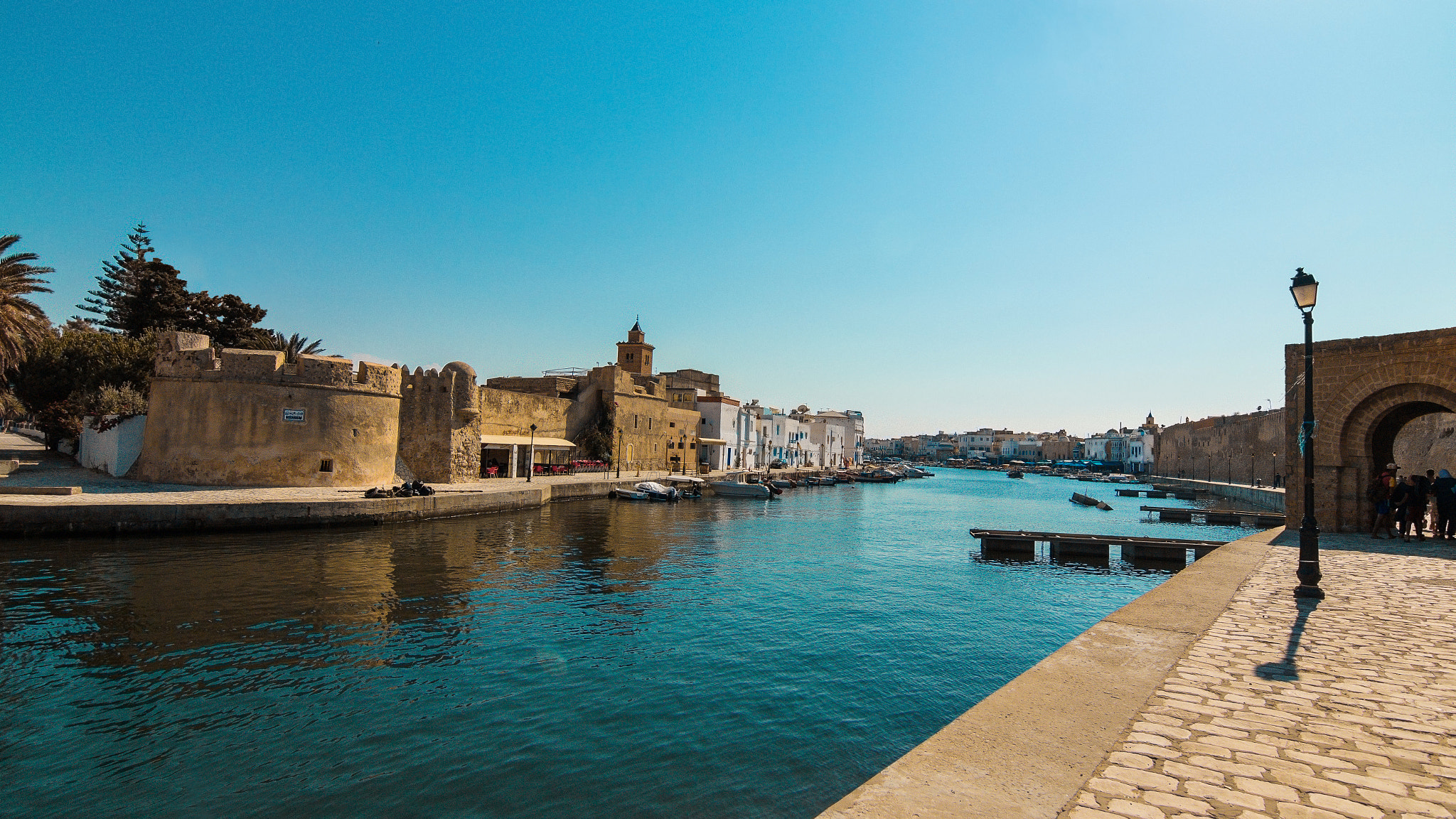

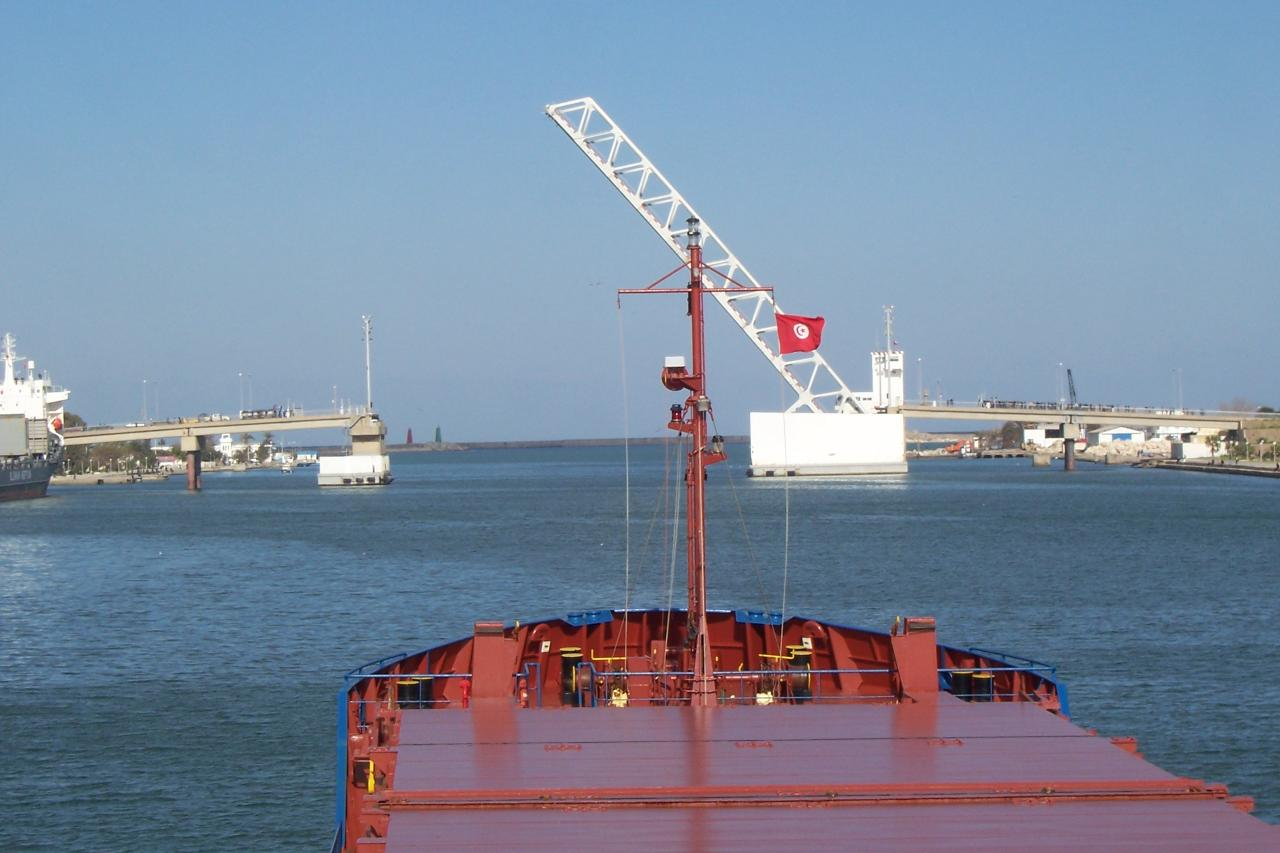

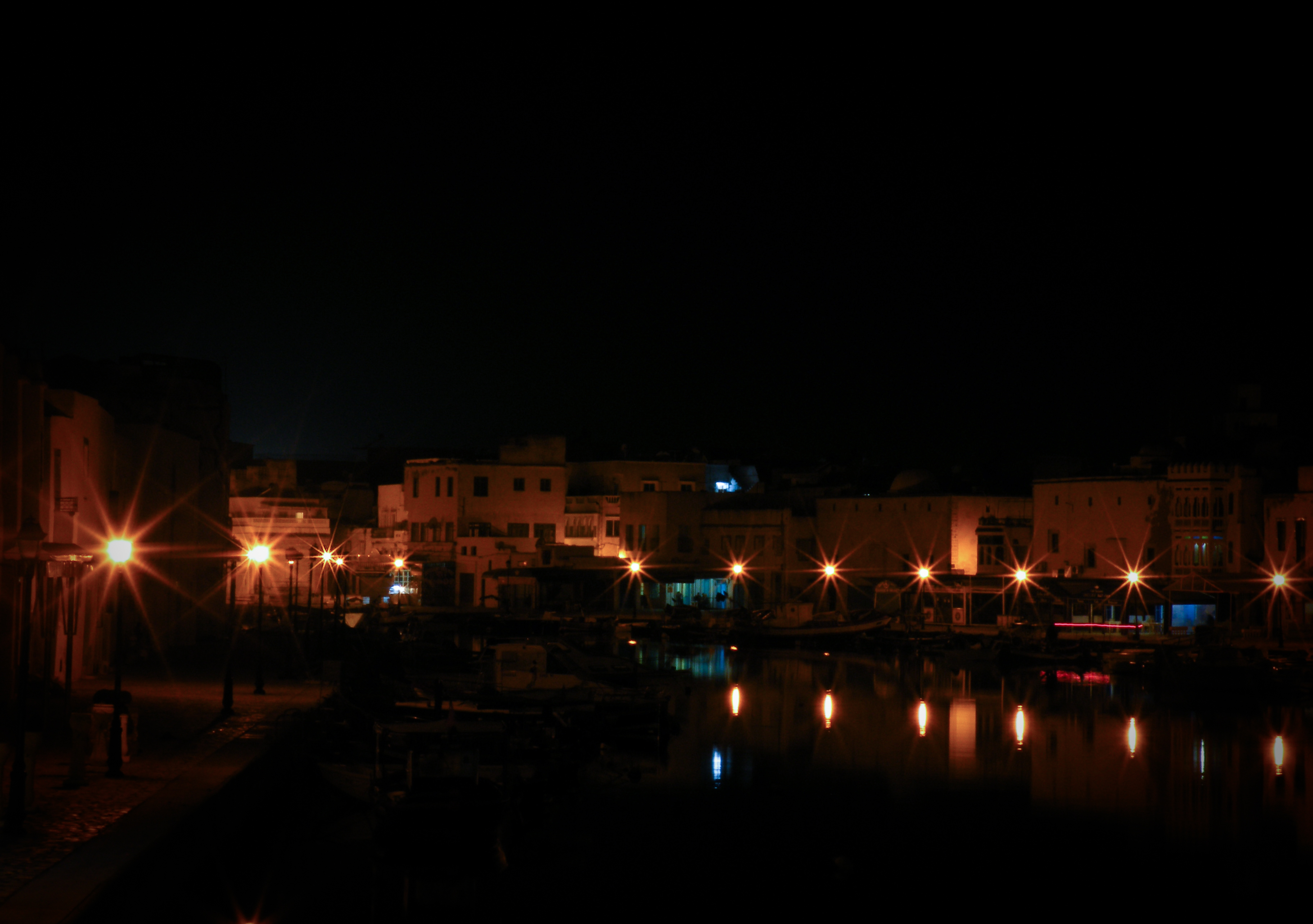

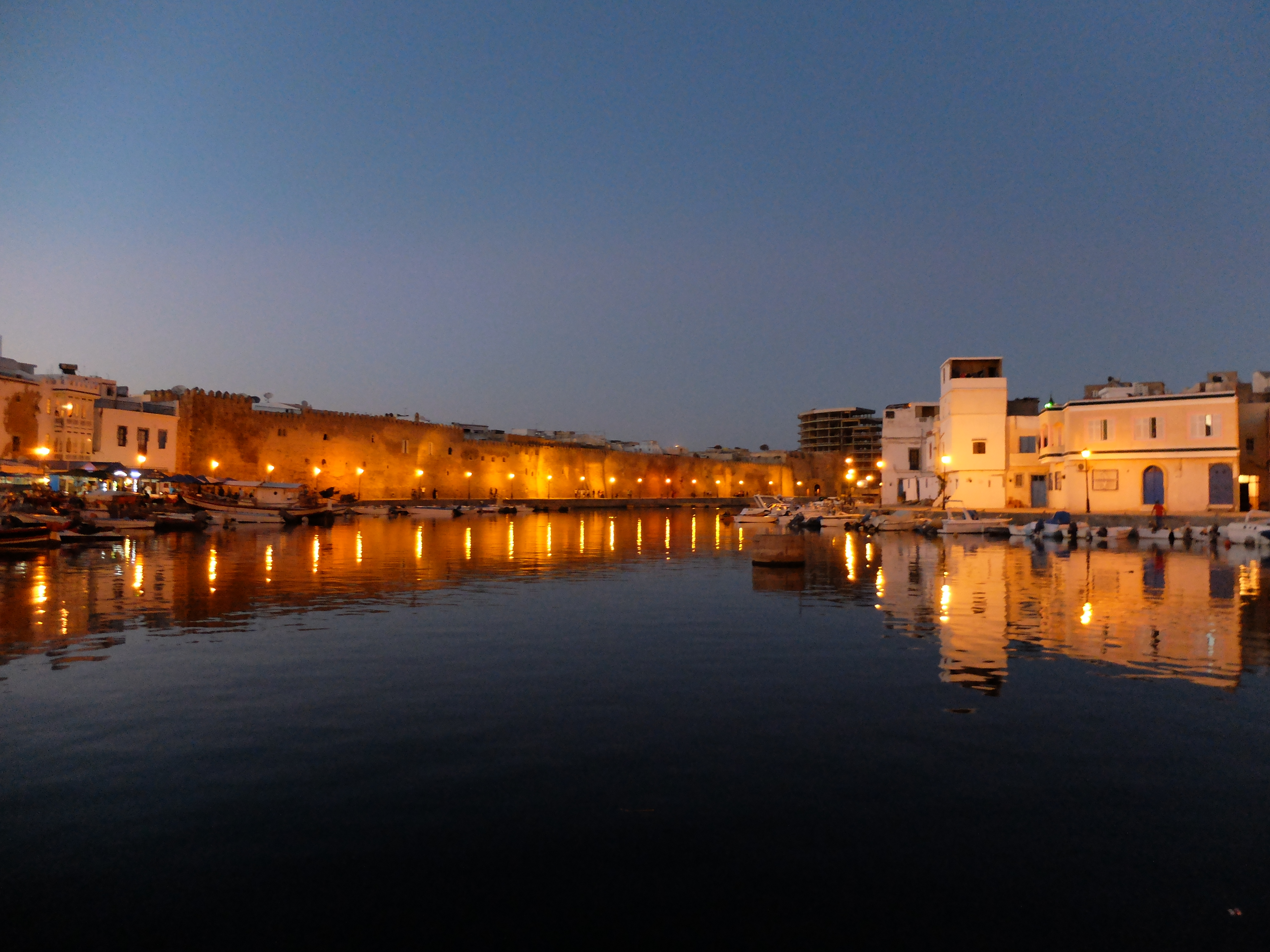

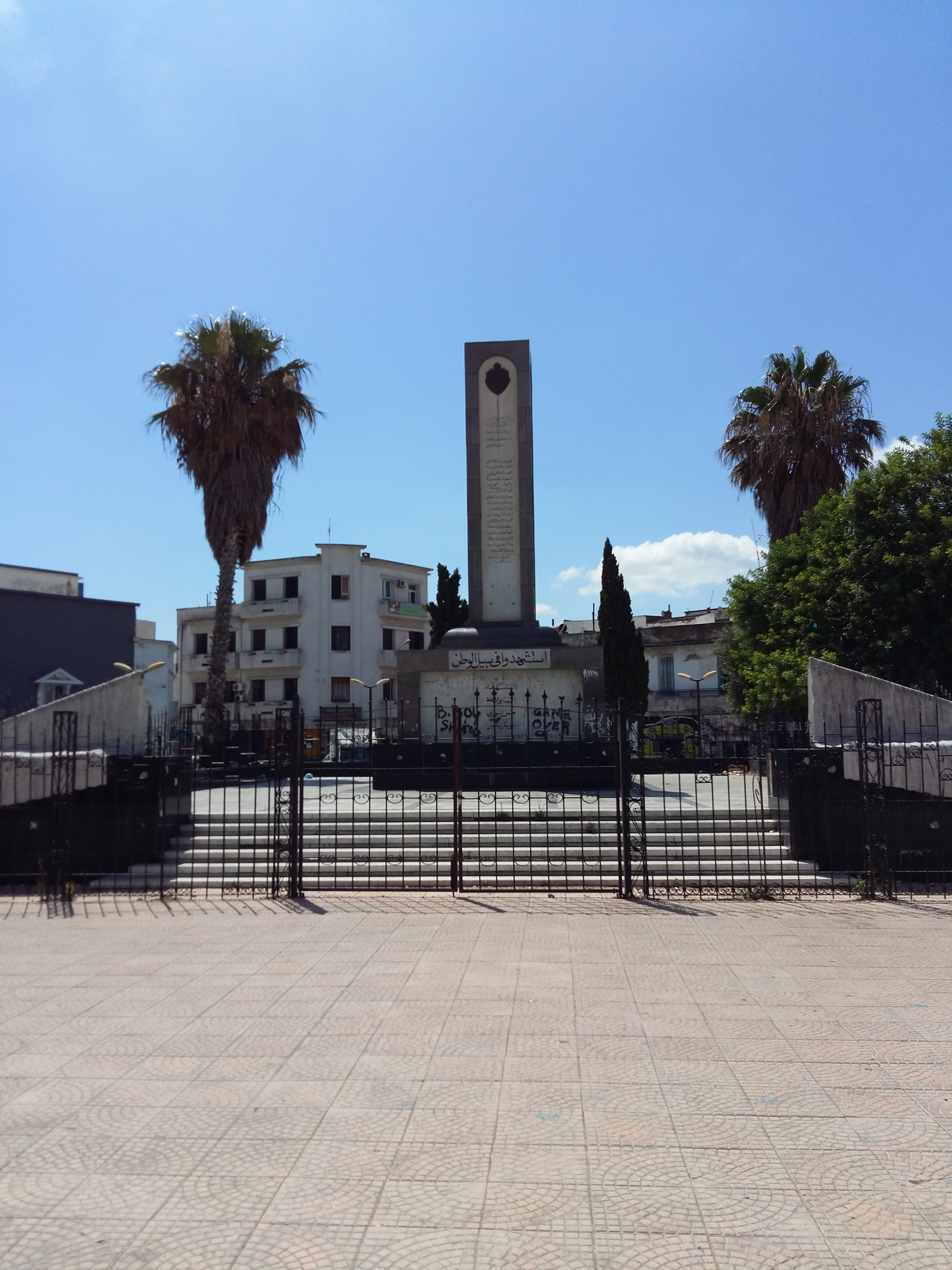

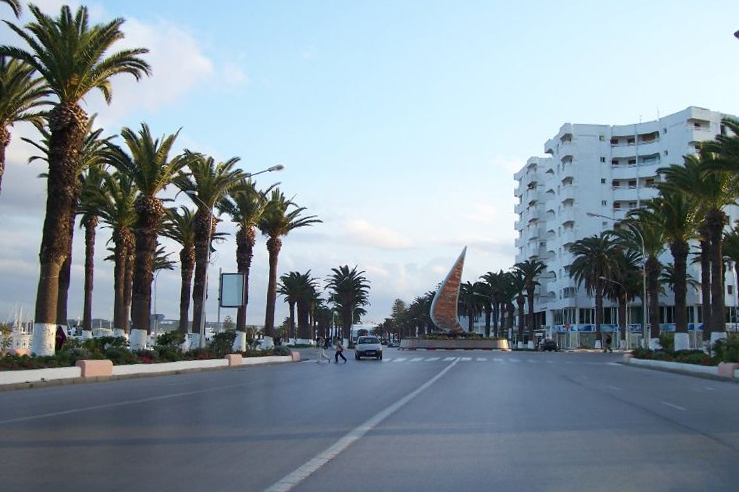

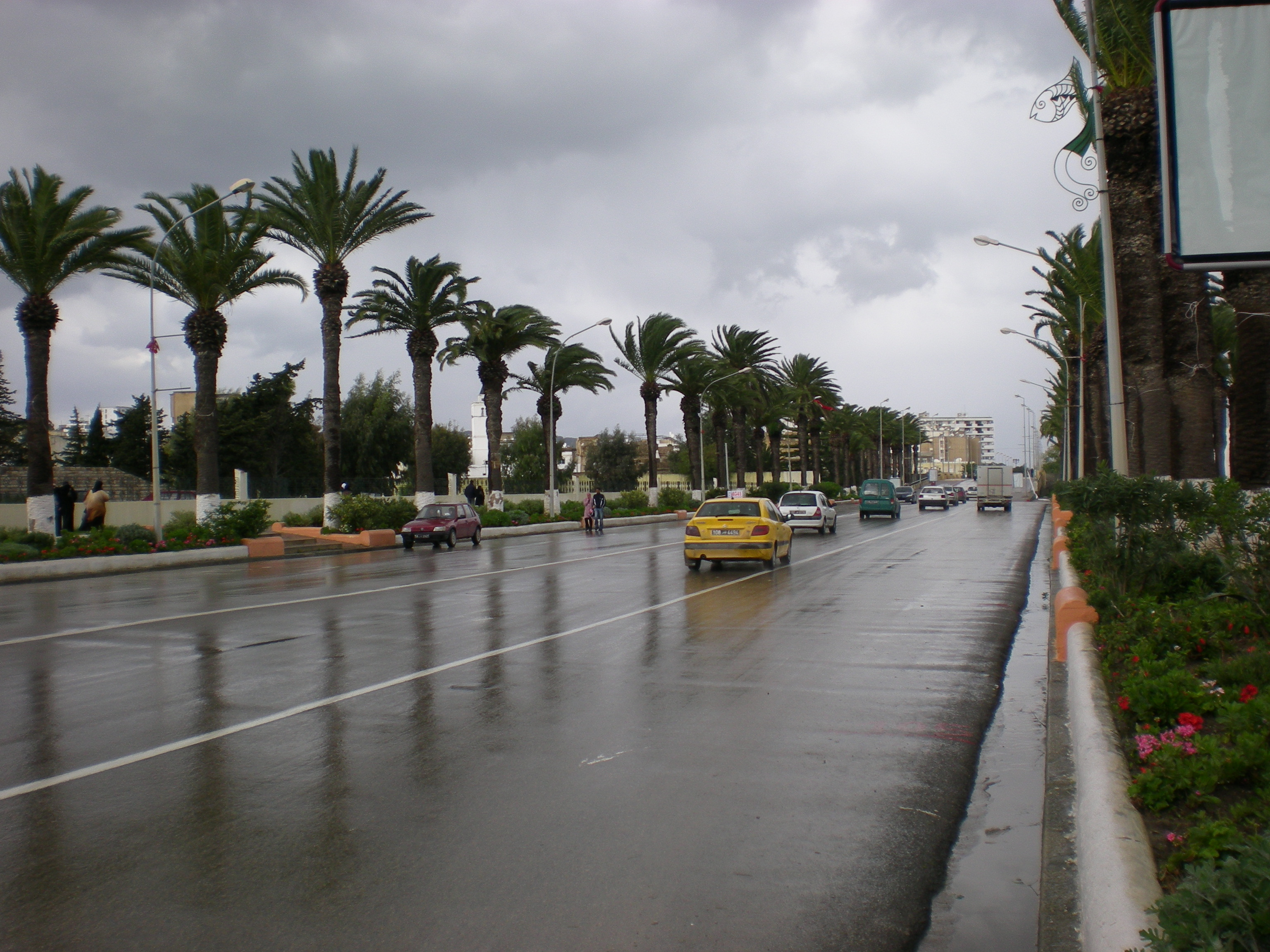

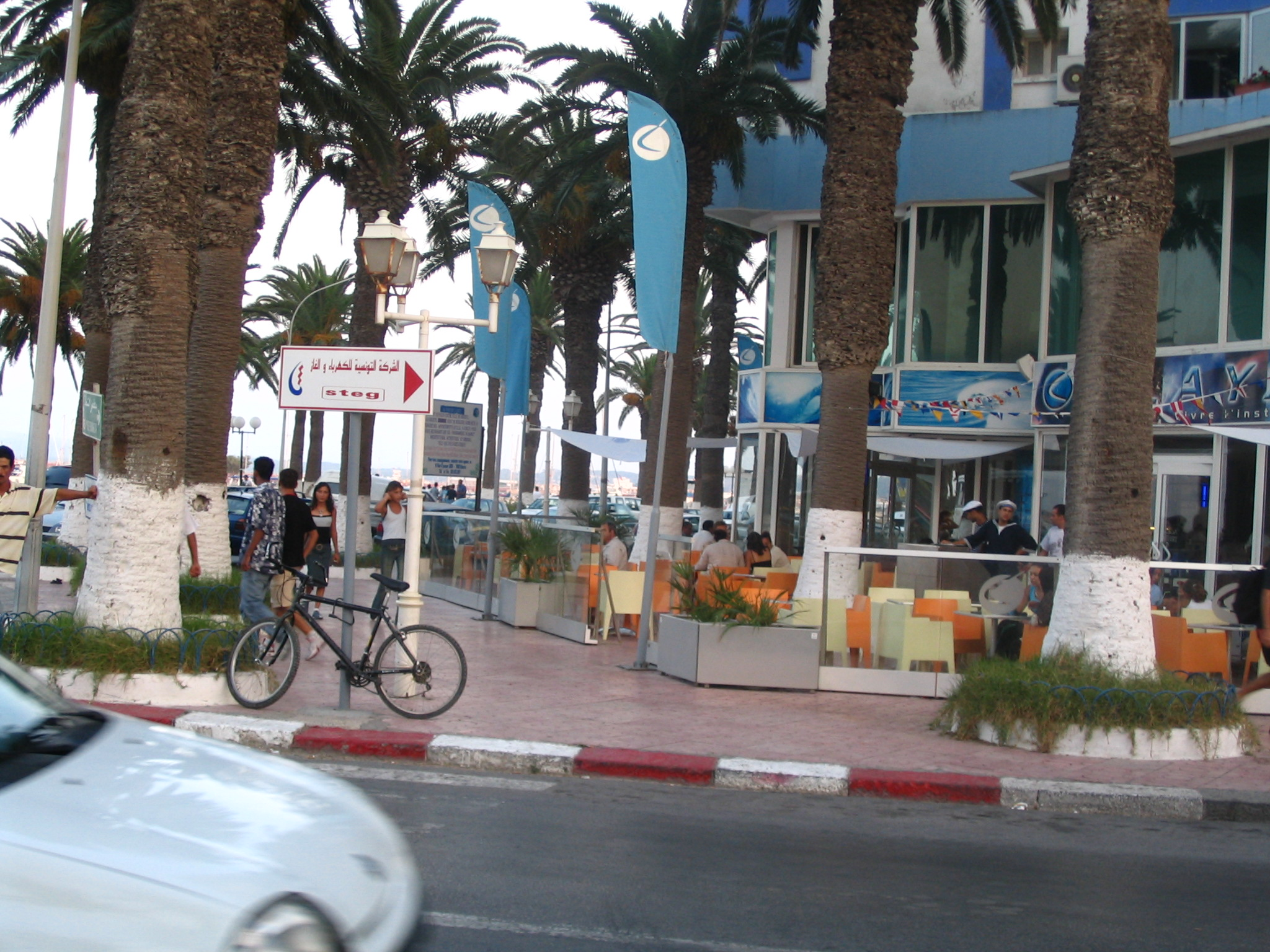

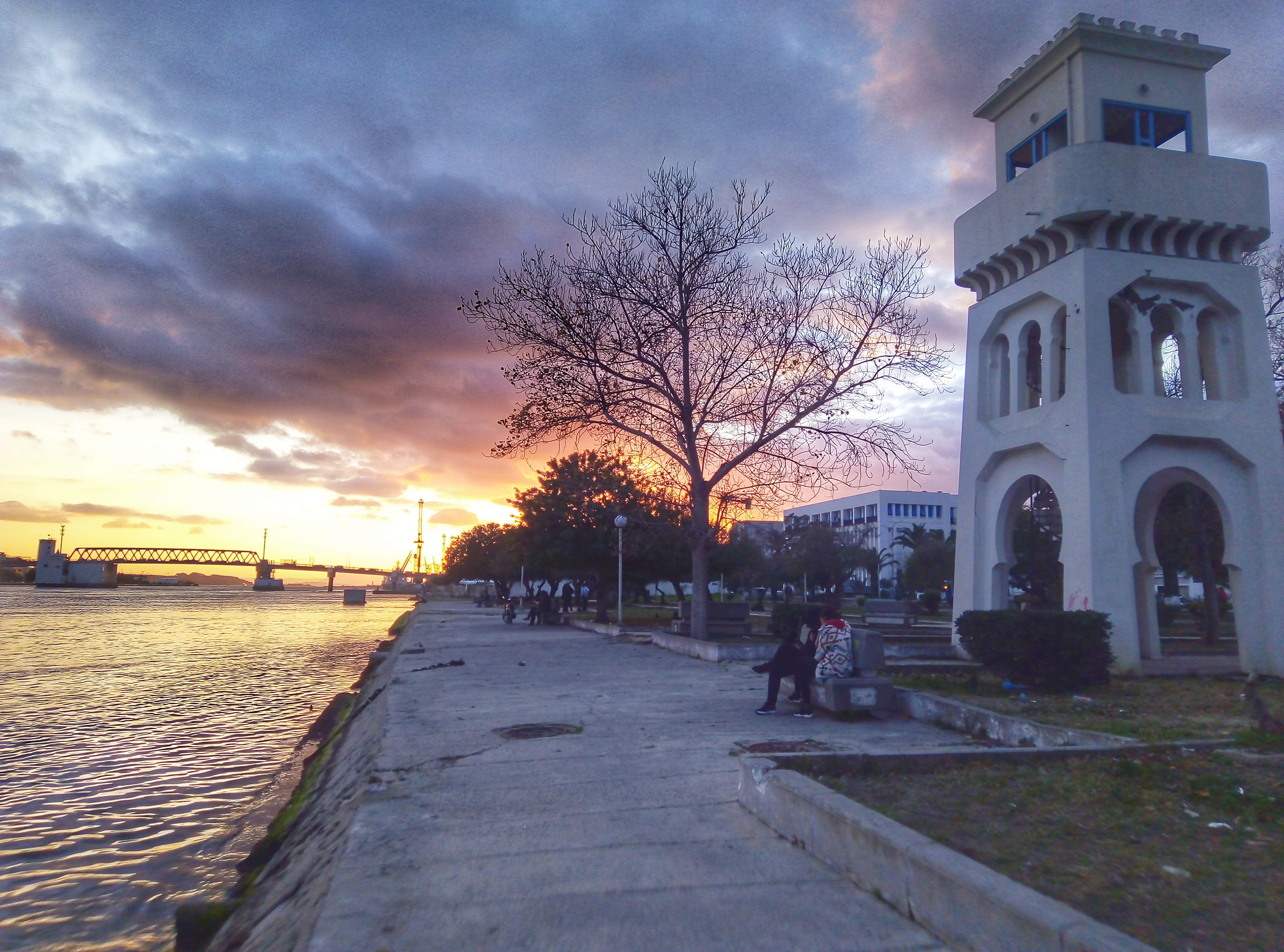

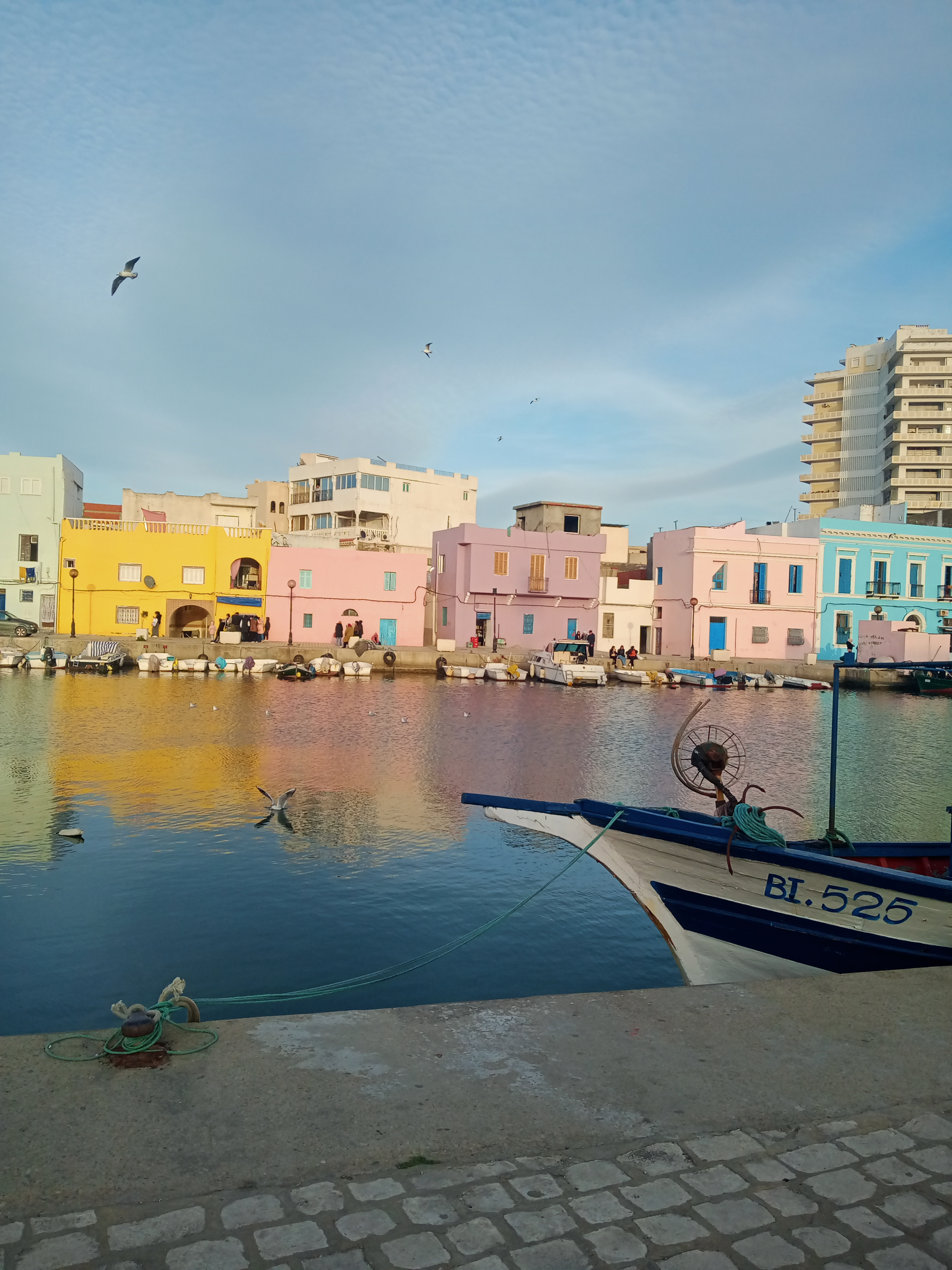
A photo for Bizerte dock, also known as leksiba

== See also ==
- European enclaves in North Africa before 1830
