= Menzel Jemil =

Tunisian town

Coordinates: 37°13′48″N 9°54′36″E

Menzel Jemil (Tunisian Arabic: منزل جميل ) is a coastal town and municipality in north-eastern Tunisia, 60 km north of the capital, Tunis. Administratively it is located in the Menzel Jemil Delegation of the Bizerte Governorate. Geographically Menzel Jemil is located on the east side of the Bizerte Lagoon and it is now considered part of the city of Bizerte metropolitan area. The municipality had 41,343 inhabitants (As of 2014 census).

Menzel Jemil is Arabic for "the beautiful hostel". Remel beach is one of the most beautiful beaches in Tunisia. It is also the panoramic view of the huge Remel forest.

Menzel Jemil has an important industrial zone where foreign and local firms are installed; most of them deal with textile industry and wiring. The town also has an important military base, owing to its strategic location in the far north of Tunisia. Most of the inhabitants are farmers or working overseas.
