= Menzel Abderrahmane =

Coordinates: 37°13′48″N 9°51′36″E

- Commune and town
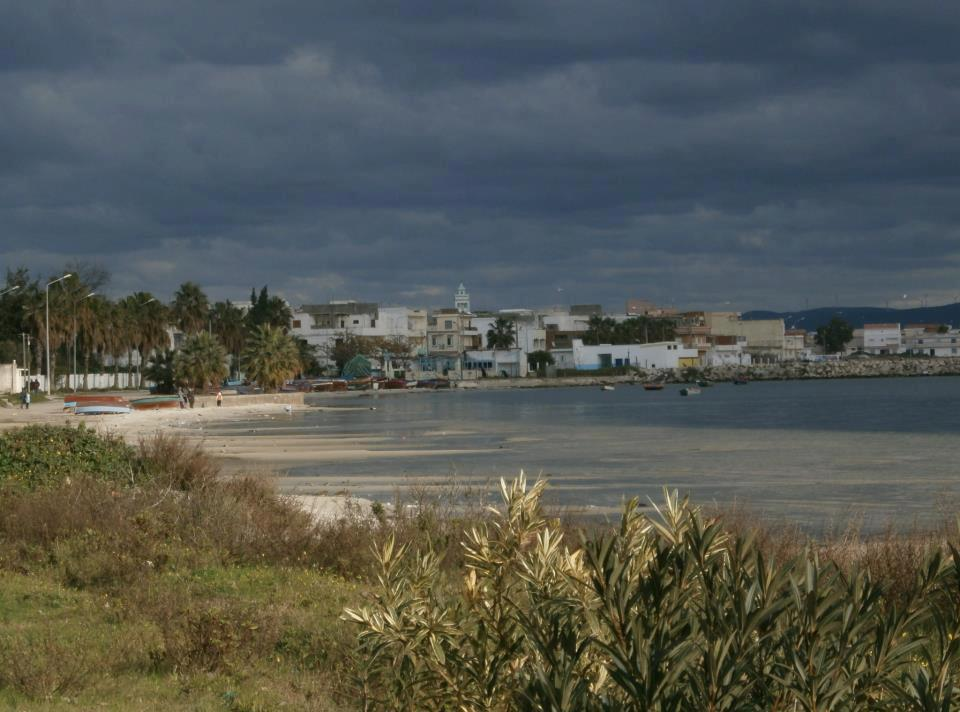
- Interactive map of Menzel Abderrahmane
- Country: Tunisia
- Governorate: Bizerte Governorate

Government
  - Mayor: Maroua Dridi (Democratic Current)

Population (2014)
  - Total: 19,078
- Time zone: UTC+1 (CET)

Menzel Abderrahmane (Arabic: منزل عبد الرحمان) is a town and commune in the Bizerte Governorate, Tunisia. As of 2004 it had a population of 16,824. The town is about sixty miles north of Tunis on the north shore of Lake Bizerte. It is part of the town of Bizerte which it is separated only a few kilometers. Attached to the Governorate of Bizerte, it belongs to the delegation of Menzel Jemil and is a municipality with 16,824 inhabitants in 2004.

The city was founded in the second half of the tenth century by the Umayyads. It is characterized by the economic importance of manufacturing industry employs around 40% of the workforce.

== Demography ==
The population is over 15,000 inhabitants, Menzel Abderrahmane has a large community abroad, especially in France (Grenoble, Toulon, Marseille and Paris region), and to a lesser extent in Italy, Germany, Belgium, and North America.

== Business ==
The town of Menzel Abderrahmane is known for fishing. In fact, it has the only port on Lake Bizerte, conducted in 1995. The fleet comprises 181 coastal boats. However, the main activity of the city is the industry including the textile industry (Stabyle).

== Education ==
The town of Menzel Abderrahmane has three primary schools (Assad Ibn Al Furat, Ibn Rachiq and 2-March 1934), college (2-March 1934) and a secondary school, El Canal, located near the city and also hosts students from the nearby town of Zarzouna.

An important educational center is under implementation since the work of the first tranche started in January 2004. The work taking place on a site of nearly one hundred acres near the Lake of Bizerte and Menzel Jemil City, and adjacent to the A4 motorway, involving the construction of a preparatory institute technological studies, space technology, an academic home for 1200 beds and a restaurant with 1500 seats. The overall cost of the various components of the first installment of this project is estimated at 35.2 million dinars. As for the second tranche will include a higher institute of commerce and accounting, an institute for higher studies ingéniorat and a college of engineering. He also issue, in this public university, teaching law and social sciences.

As part of this massive operation, the city of Menzel Abderrahmane has a significant urban renewal with the complete refurbishment of the entrance to the city, public spaces and the seat of the municipality.

== See also ==
- List of cities in Tunisia
- Bizerte Lake
