= Soliman, Tunisia =

Soliman سليمان
- Commune and town
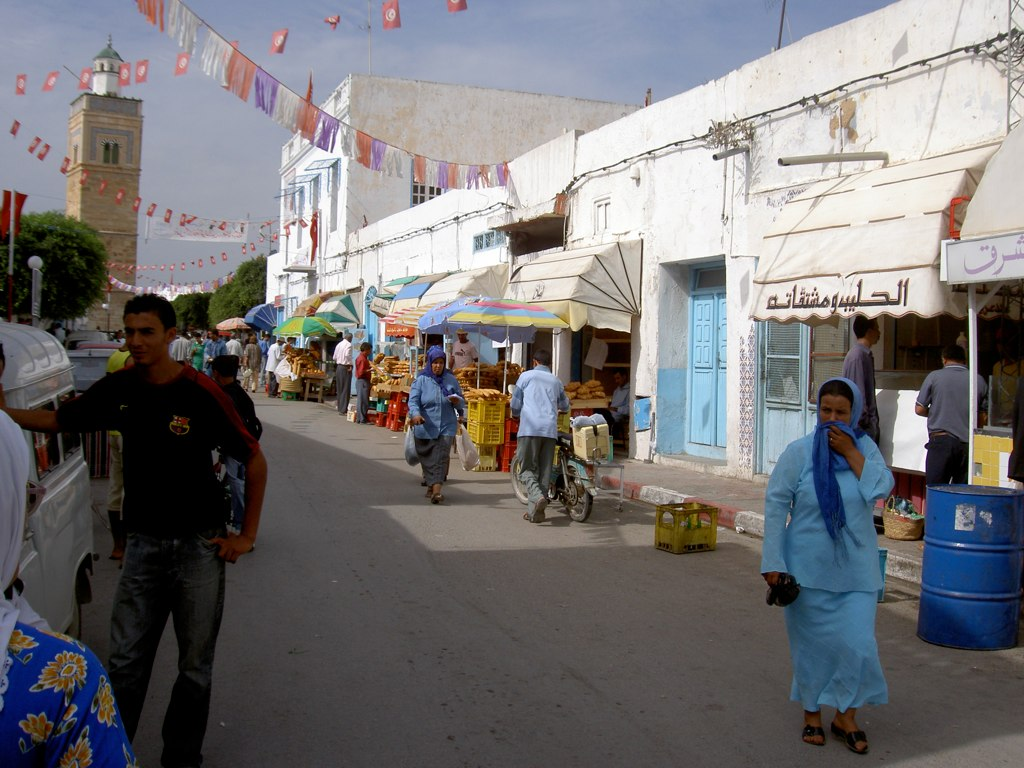
- Commercial zone of Soliman
- Interactive map of Soliman
- Coordinates: 36°41′40″N 10°29′12″E
- Country: Tunisia
- Governorate: Nabeul Governorate

Population (2022)
  - Total: 45,053
- Time zone: UTC+1 (CET)
- Postal code: 8020

Soliman, Tunisia (Tunsi: Slimène [Slee-men]) is a town and commune in the Nabeul Governorate, in the north-eastern part of Tunisia. As of 2017, it had a population of 57,060.

Located in the heart of a fertile plain, it is a marketing centre for agricultural products from the surrounding countryside. In addition, it is home to an important industrial area with the presence of mechanical engineering plants, including equipment manufacturers for the automotive industry. Caught up in urbanization, it is gradually being transformed into a suburb of Tunis.

A beach extends five kilometers to the northwest, at the bottom of the Gulf of Tunis, offering a panoramic view.

Soliman was the site of a deadly shootout between Tunisian security forces and individuals presumed to be "Islamist terrorists" on January 3, 2007.

It's also the birthplace of the popular Tunisian artist Balti

== History ==
The city owes its development, from the sixteenth century, to the settlement of Turkish soldiers from the Ottoman Empire which had just established its hold on Tunisia (its name comes from the surname of a Turk who owned a vast agricultural estate) and above all, in the seventeenth century, to the arrival of Morisco populations driven out of Andalusia.

As in several other Tunisian cities of Cap Bon (Nabeul, Grombalia, Turki, etc.), the Medjerda Valley (Testour, Majaz al Bab, Kalâat el-Andalous, etc.) and the Bizerte region (Metline, El Alia, Ras Jebel, Raf Raf, Ghar el-Melh and Menzel Jemil), Soliman has preserved traces of this Andalusian contribution, mainly visible in the urban planning and building architecture. Thus, the historic centre of the city has a network of narrow streets intersecting perpendicularly and the housing is made up of small terraced houses, organised around a patio often shaded by a tree, with a space for accommodation (dar) separated from a service area (douira) and a stable (makhzen)). The wealthiest families owned an extra floor. The buildings are painted white, the doors are made of elaborately painted wood and the houses sometimes have green tile roofs.

In the city centre, two mosques bear witness to this dual influence, one of the Maliki rite that can be seen by its minaret built on a square base, and the other of the Hanafi rite (that of the Turks) with an octagonal base.

== See also ==
- List of cities in Tunisia
