= Tunisian jebba =

Traditional Tunisian garment

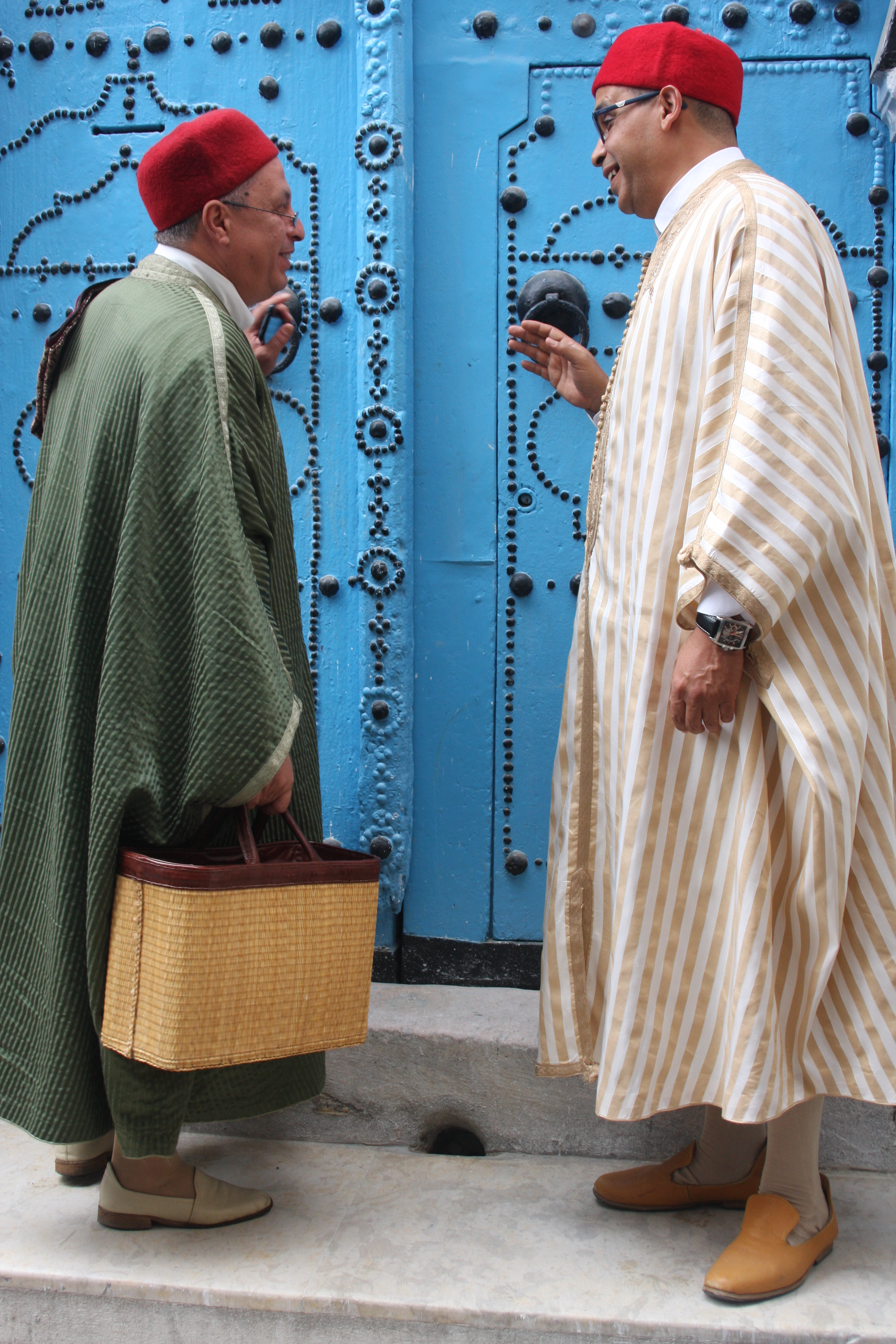
Tunisian men wearing jebbas and chechias.

The Tunisian jebba (Arabic: جبة) is a traditional loose-fitting garment associated with Tunisia and a principal element of traditional Tunisian male dress. It is traditionally made from materials including wool, silk and linen, and exists in a number of styles and regional variations. Historical forms of the jebba have also formed part of women's traditional dress in several regions of Tunisia.

The garment is traditionally worn with other elements of Tunisian dress, including the farmla or sadria waistcoat, sarouel, balgha and chechia. Different forms of the jebba are associated with several regions and cities of Tunisia.

== Description ==
The Tunisian jebba is a loose-fitting garment that covers most of the body while leaving the forearms and lower legs uncovered. Its construction and decoration vary according to the fabric, region and intended use. Traditional materials include wool, silk and linen.

The jebba may be worn with a waistcoat known as a farmla, badia or sadria, together with a jacket, sarouel trousers fastened at the waist with a silk belt, traditional balgha footwear and a chechia.

== Regional and historical forms ==
Although the jebba is principally associated with traditional male dress in Tunisia, the term has also been used for forms of women's traditional dress in several regions. Historical records from Sfax document women's jebbas during the 19th and early 20th centuries, with changes in their decoration over time.

Women's bridal clothing from Raf Raf has also included several forms of embroidered jebba. The Textile Research Centre, Leiden documents the jebba star, which became part of the bridal costume in the early 20th century, and the jebba suf bel-qros, a black-cloth tunic decorated with metal-thread embroidery.

The Metropolitan Museum of Art holds several historical Tunisian garments catalogued as jebbas, including an early 20th-century embroidered wedding tunic decorated with motifs associated with fertility and protection.

== History and influences ==
The Tunisian jebba developed over several centuries as part of Tunisia's urban clothing tradition. Its development reflects successive cultural influences in Tunisia, including exchanges with the wider Maghreb, Andalusia and the Levant, particularly during the Hafsid and Ottoman periods.

Andalusian and Turkish influences contributed to the development of the garment in the form in which it is traditionally worn in Tunisia today. Over time, regional variations developed across the country, differing in their fabrics, colours and decorative techniques.

== Cultural significance and use ==
The jebba is regarded as an important element of Tunisian traditional dress. It is worn on ceremonial and festive occasions, including weddings and religious celebrations. The garment continues to be produced by specialist artisans using traditional tailoring and embroidery techniques.

The jebba is also worn during Tunisia's annual National Day of Traditional Dress, an event celebrating the country's traditional clothing and handicrafts.

Ethnographic research on traditional marriage customs in the Zaghouan region documents the jebba qamrāya, a silk jebba worn by the groom as part of the keswet el-himma, a prestige costume associated with weddings and other important occasions.

Tunisia has been preparing a nomination dossier concerning the jebba for possible inscription on UNESCO's Intangible Cultural Heritage lists. Although plans for the nomination were reported in 2025, the dossier remained under preparation in April 2026.

== Craftsmanship and regional varieties ==
The manufacture of the jebba involves specialised cutting, sewing and embroidery. Its form varies according to regional traditions, intended use and the materials and decoration employed. Traditional jebbas are made from fabrics including wool, silk and linen.

A number of named styles and regional forms are produced in Tunisia. Variations have been associated with Sfax, Nabeul, Raf Raf, Tunis, Hammamet, Monastir and Soliman.

== See also ==
- Jubbah (Muslim garment)
- Chechia
- Balgha
