= Jubbah (Muslim garment) =

Traditional coat worn by Muslims

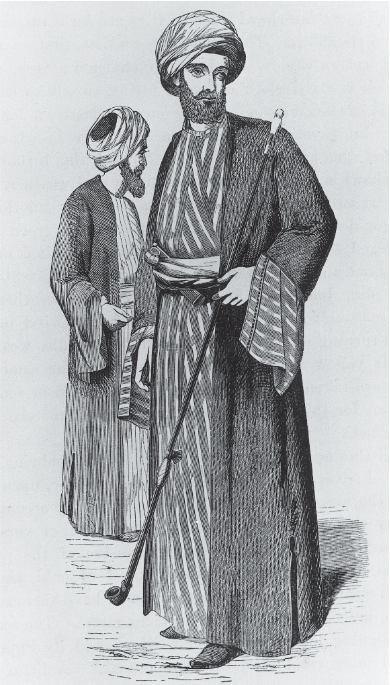
19th-century engraving of Egyptian man in striped jubba

Jubbah (also spelled jibbah, gubba, Arabic: جُبَّة; pronunciation: /ˈdʒʌbə/) is an Arabic word referring to a long, loose outer garment or robe, traditionally worn by men in many parts of the Middle East, North Africa, and South Asia. Historically it has been worn by scholars, Sufi sheikhs, and officials, and is still used today in some religious or cultural contexts.

== Etymology ==
The Arabic word ǧubba means 'long woollen garment, undergarment'. It is derived from the root ج-ب-ب meaning to cut, to open, referring to a robe “cut open” at the front. It is considered to be the origin of terms for similar garments in various European languages, such as Joppe (German), Tschoope (in Switzerland), including jupe (French) and giubba (Italian), the latter two meaning skirt in contemporary usage.

== Description ==
The jubbah is at least partially open at the front and has wide sleeves that do not quite reach the wrists, from which the sleeves of the undergarment protrude. Sometimes the garment is fastened at the top with a button, but is worn without a belt. It reaches down to the ankles. Fabrics may range from wool in colder climates to lighter fabrics in warmer regions.

According to the study Arab Dress: A Short History from the Dawn of Islam to Modern Times, it was imported into other areas of the Middle East and North Africa during the time of the founder of Islam, the Prophet Muhammad, from Syria and possibly other regions of the Byzantine Empire.

=== In Tunisia ===
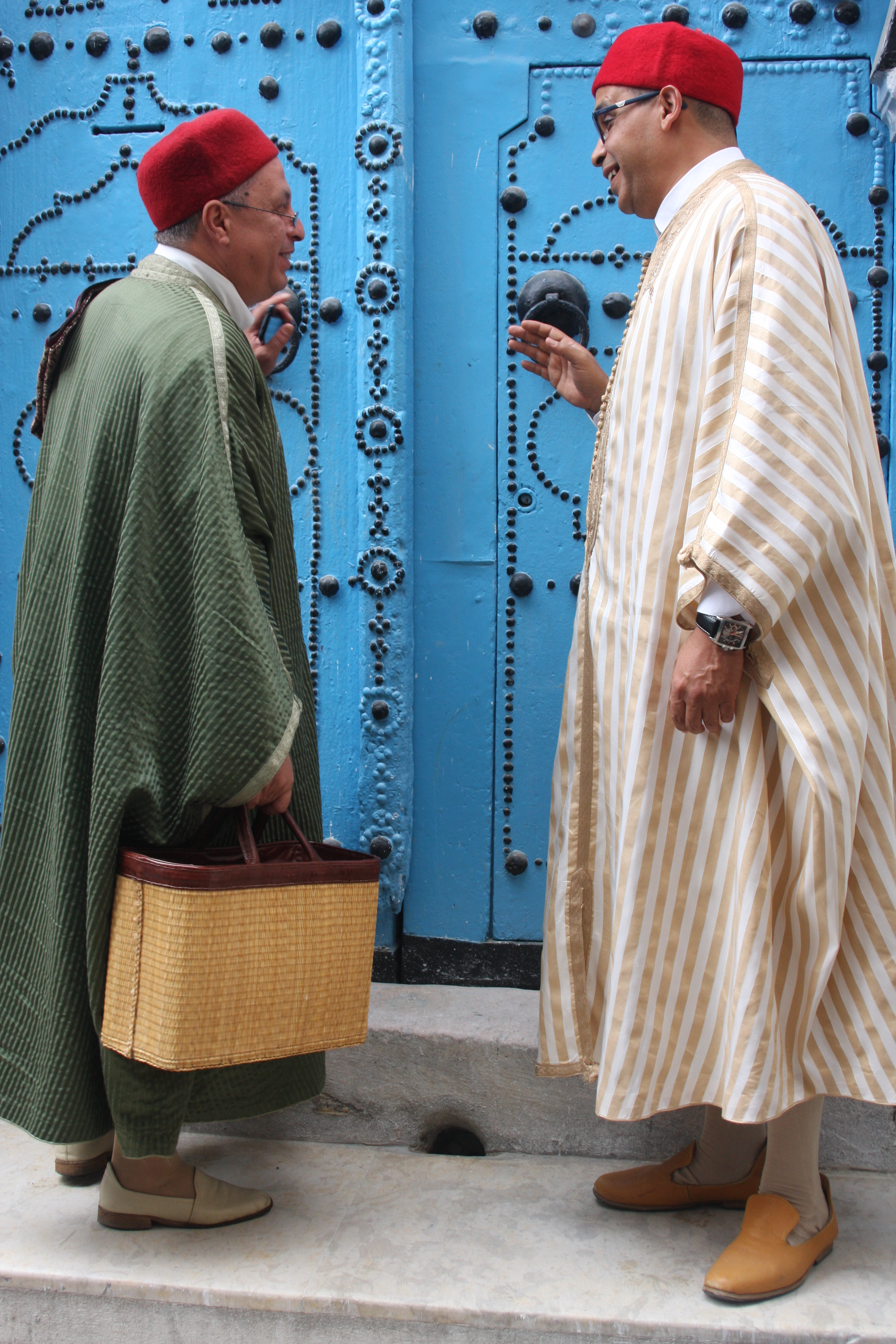
Tunisian men wearing jebbas and chechia hats.

The Tunisian jebba is a variant of the Maghrebi djellaba. Made of wool, but also silk or linen, this garment covers the entire body without covering the forearms or calves. It can be worn with a waistcoat (farmla, badia or sadria), a jacket (mentan), baggy trousers (sarouel) tied at the waist with a silk belt, a pair of balghas and a chechia. It can also be covered with a burnous when worn outdoors.

The jebba is characterised by its distinctive Andalusian features, dating back to the arrival of Moorish refugees in Tunisia, and the fact that it is made from different fabrics and embellished with embroidery. Worn particularly during religious and official celebrations, wedding ceremonies and circumcisions, it remains the main garment worn by officials and imams in Tunisia.

=== In Sufi context ===
The jubbah often symbolizes renunciation of worldly attachments or initiation into a spiritual path. This is why the quote attributed to the Sufi mystic Al-Hallaj "There is nothing under the jubbah except God" appears in mystical literature.

== See also ==
- Jellabiya
- Thawb

== General and cited references ==
- Akou, Heather Marie (2007). "Building a New 'World Fashion': Islamic Dress in the Twenty-first Century". Fashion Theory. 11 (4). Informa UK Limited: 403–421. doi:10.2752/175174107x250226. ISSN 1362-704X.
- Baker, Patricia Lesley (1986). A History of Islamic Court Dress in the Middle East (PhD). SOAS University of London. doi:10.25501/SOAS.00033676.
- Grub, Valentina S. (2020-10-21). "A Brief History of Academic Dress in the Middle East and the Maghreb". Transactions of the Burgon Society. 19 (1). doi:10.4148/2475-7799.1170. ISSN 2475-7799.
- Spring, Christopher (1995). "Beyond the Loom: Non-woven Designs and Techniques". North African Textiles. London: British Museum Press for the Trustees of the British Museum. pp. 99–105. ISBN 978-0-7141-2523-7. OCLC 34544100.
- Stillman, Yedida Kalfon (2000-01-01). "The Evolution of the Islamic Vestimentary System Under the Great Caliphates". Arab Dress: A Short History. Brill. pp. 29–61. doi:10.1163/9789004491625_009. ISBN 978-90-04-49162-5.
- Stillman, Yedida Kalfon (2003). Arab Dress: From the Dawn of Islam to Modern Times (PDF) (Revised Second ed.). Leiden, Netherlands; Boston: Brill. ISBN 9004113738. Archived from the original on 2025-10-12.
