= Cape Serrat =

Headland in Bizerte Governorate, Tunisia

- Cape
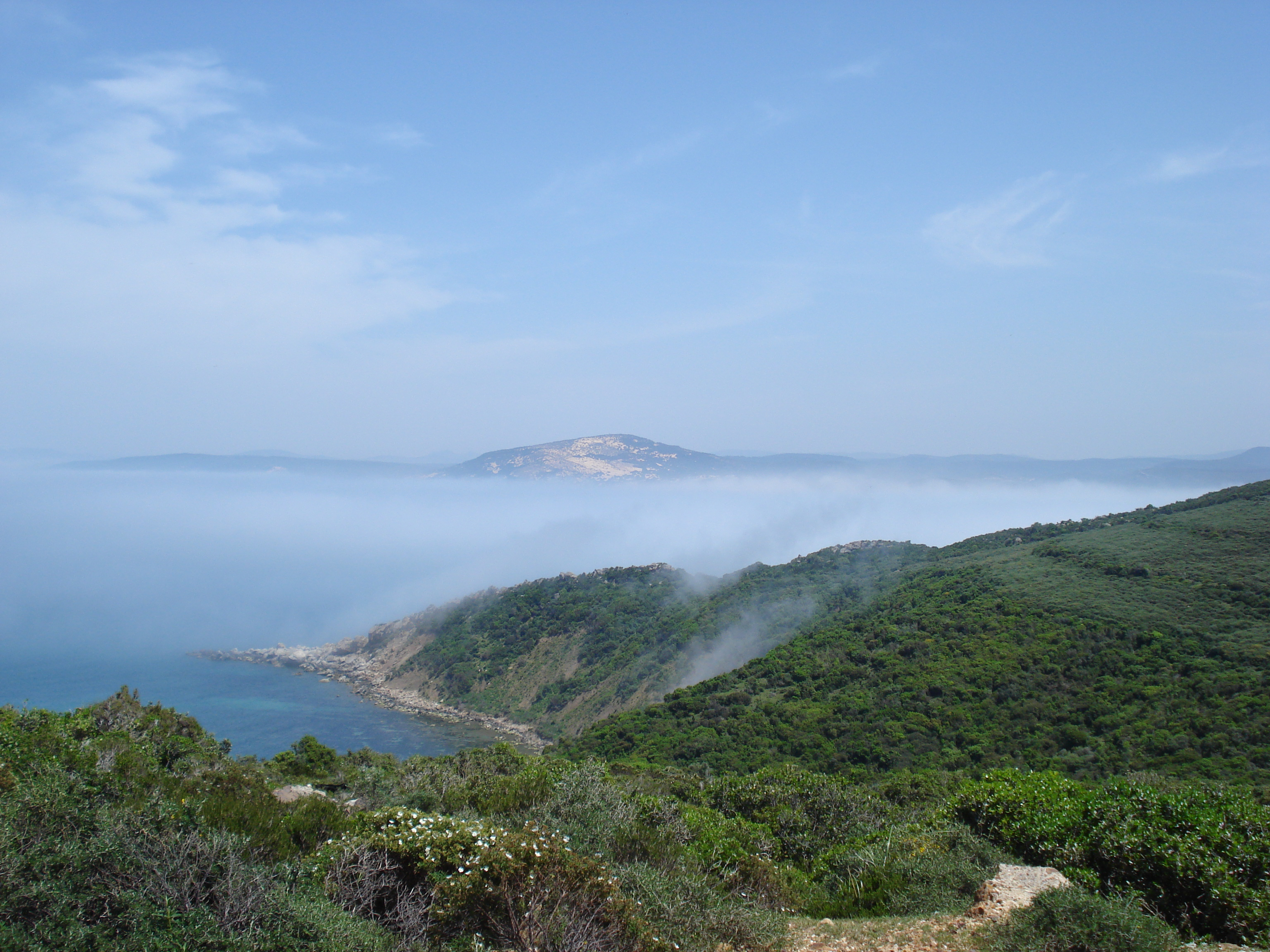
- View of the cape

- Location within Tunisia
- Coordinates: 37°14′25″N 9°13′05″E
- Location: Bizerte Governorate, Tunisia

Cape Serrat (French: Cap Serrat; Arabic: رأس سيراط) is a cape situated in western Bizerte Governorate in northwest Tunisia. The cape is located between the cities of Sejnane and Tabarka. In 2023, a Tunisian army helicopter crash at Cape Serra killed four soldiers.
