= Cape Zebib =

Headland in northern Tunisia

Cape Zebib رأس زبيب
- Cape
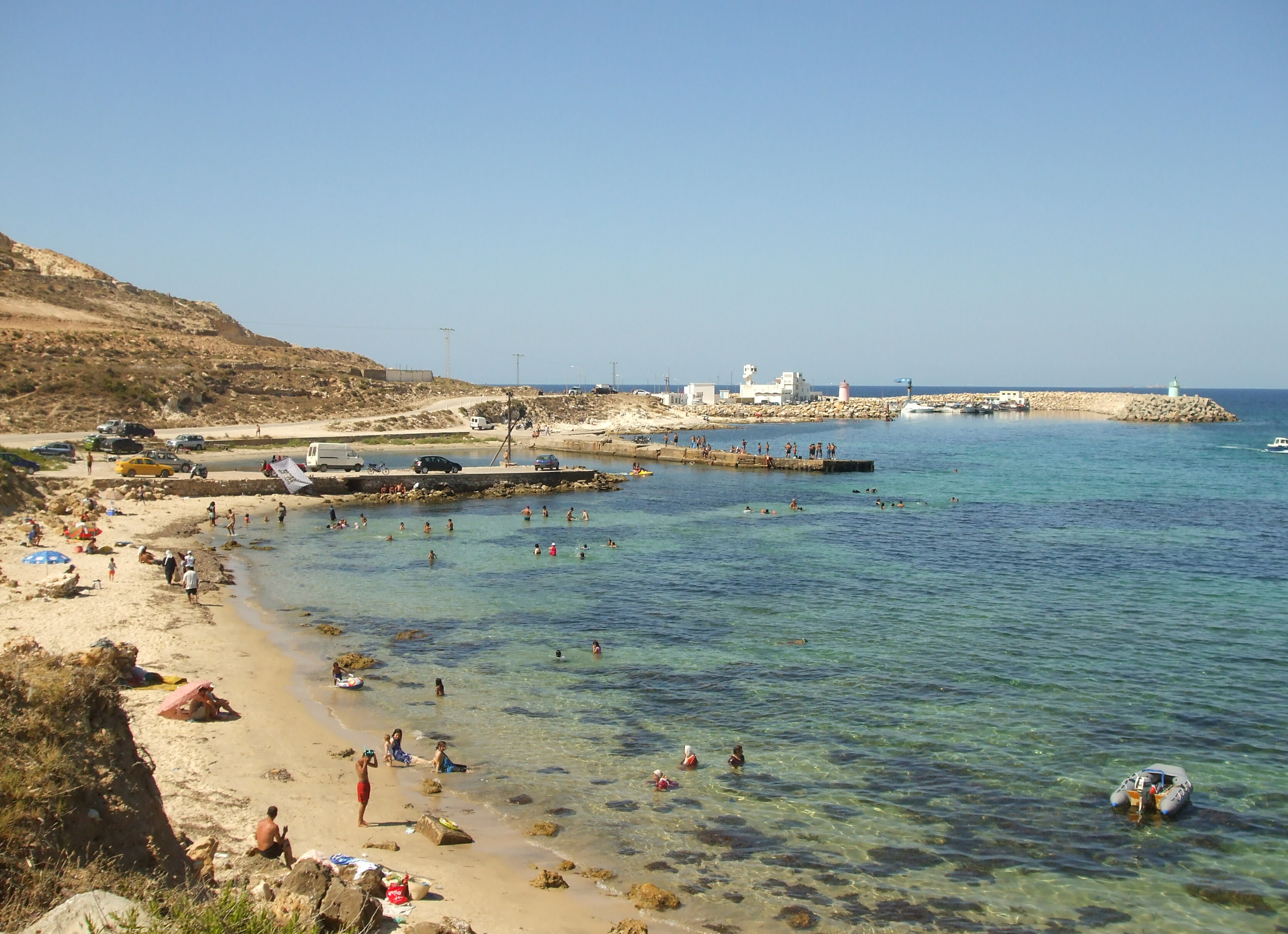
- Skala Beach

- Coordinates: 37°15′56″N 10°04′04″E
- Location: Bizerte Governorate, Tunisia

Cape Zebib (French: Cap Zebib; Arabic: رأس زبيب, Ras Zebib) is a headland in northern Tunisia near the town of Metline. The bay between Cape Guardia and Cape Zebib has the sandy Skala Beach; Skala was also an ancient port. Bizerte stands on the lowest part of the coast, which thence gradually rises to the cape. Jebel Kshapta is 13 miles (21 km) to the south-west of the cape.

Cape Zebib sits at the eastern extremity of Bizerte Road. Here, there are two cones 312 ft (95 m) high. Near the extremity of the cape, there is a small community. Cani Rocks, 5 miles (8.0 km) north/north-eastward from Cape Zebib, consist of two islets scarcely separated, extending 6 cables in a north-easterly and south-westerly direction, with outlying rocks and shoal patches. To the south-eastward of Cape Zebib, the coast is low with some cliffs and small beaches. These are bordered by sandy hillocks, a cultivated plain, and the village of Ras Jebel, eastward of which, the wooded hills extend to Jebel Nadur. Some rocks, covered and uncovered, lie off this coast.
