= Cape Angela =

Northernmost point in Africa

- Cape
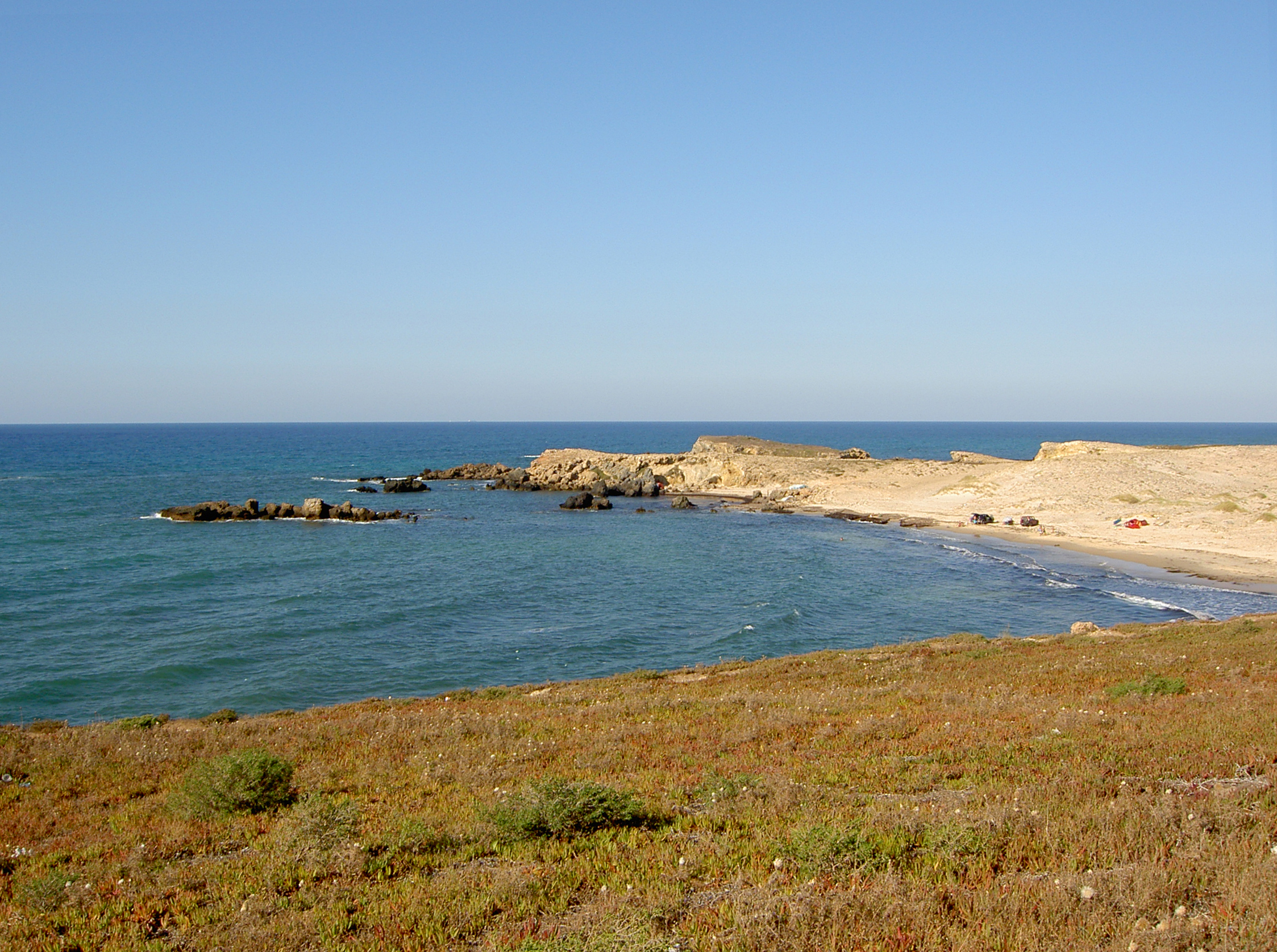
- Cape Angela

- Location in Tunisia
- Coordinates: 37°20′49″N 9°44′32″E
- Location: Bizerte Governorate, Tunisia

Cape Angela (French: Cap Angela; Arabic: رأس أنجلة) is a rocky headland in Bizerte, Tunisia. Its tip, Ras Ben Sakka, has been considered the northernmost point of the African continent since 2014, replacing Cape Blanc (Ras al-Abyad), also in Tunisia. It is located about 15 kilometers (9.3 mi) from Bizerte, the northernmost city in Africa and 22 kilometers (14 mi) from Ichkeul Lake.

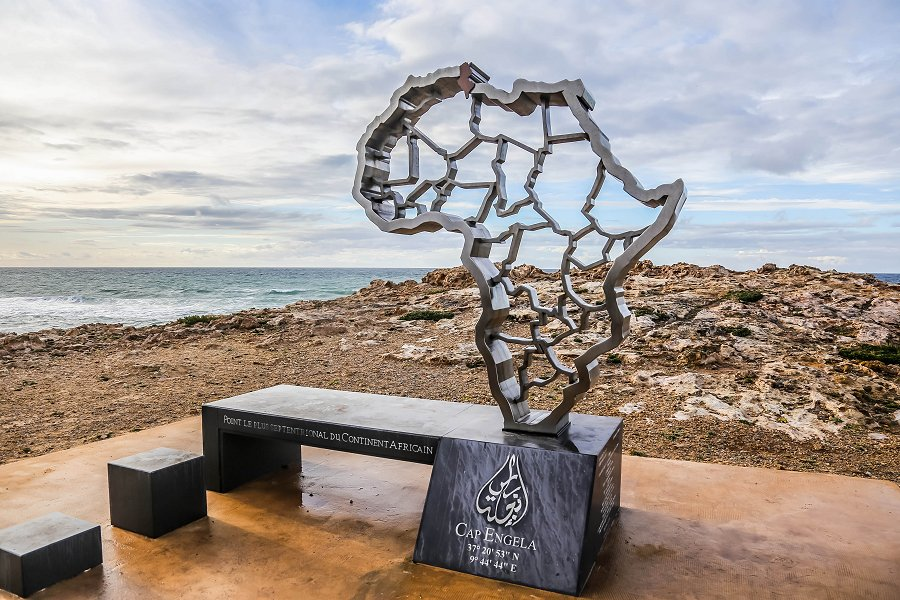
Monument

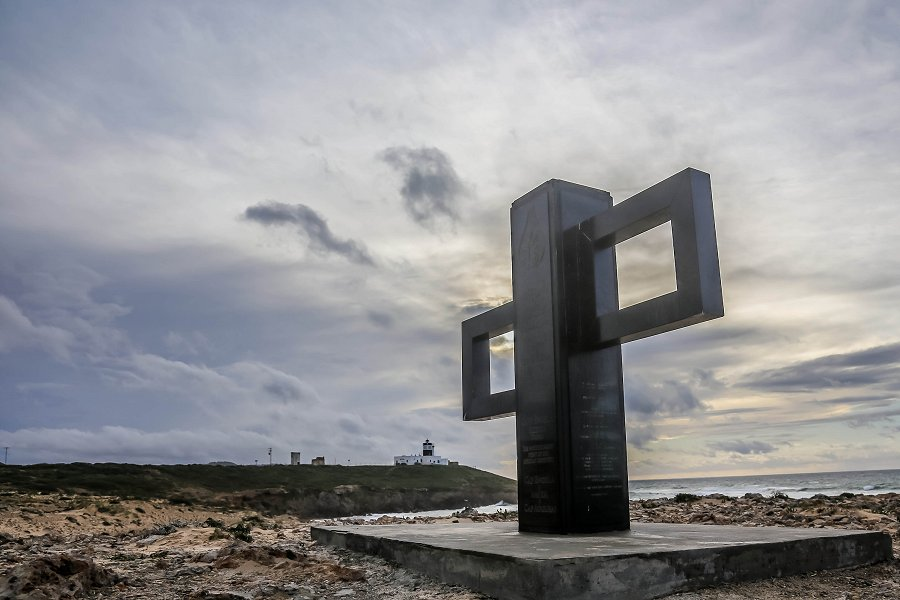
Monument

== See also ==
- Cape Agulhas, the southernmost point of Africa.
