= Aousja =

- Commune and town
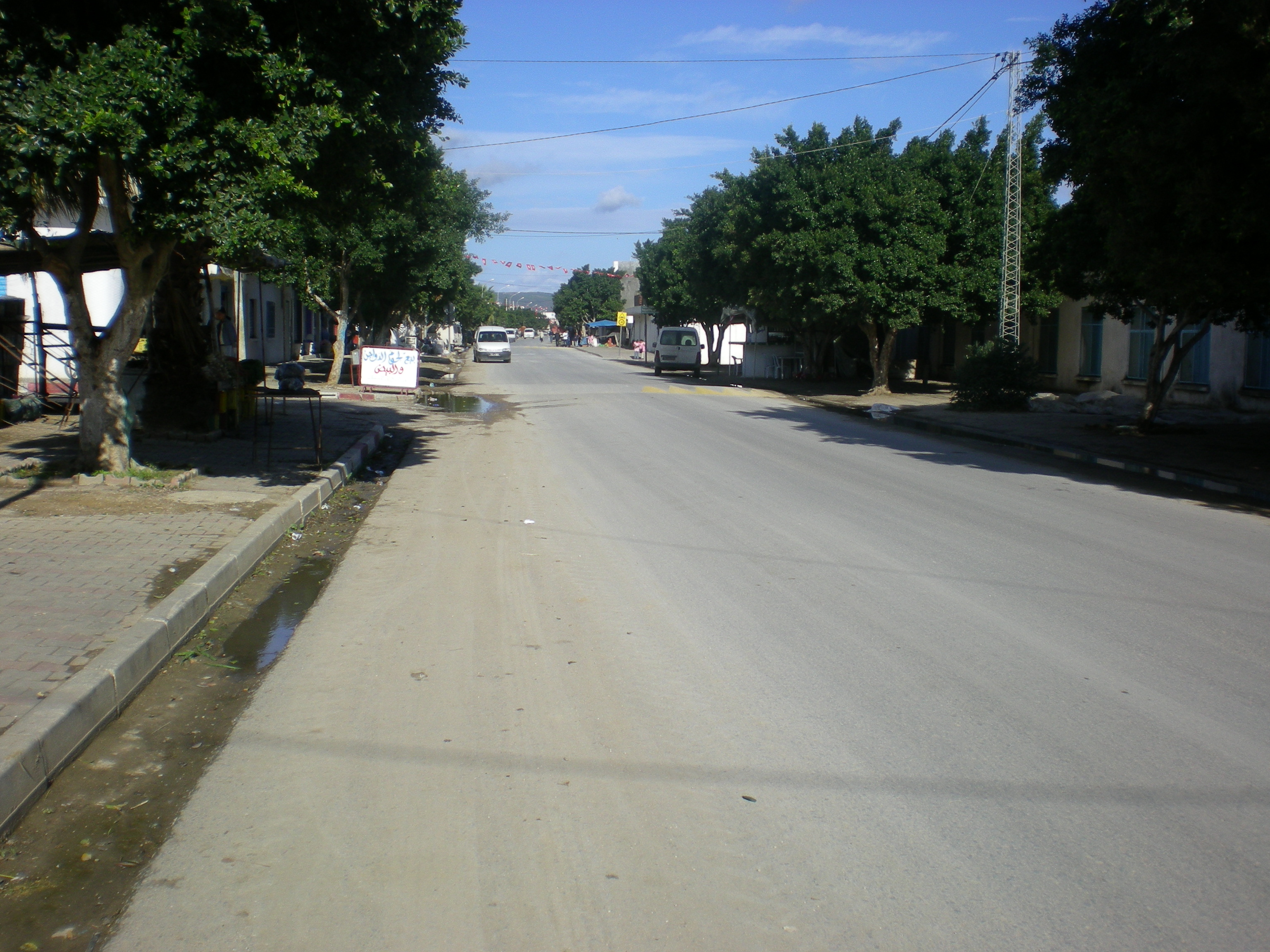

- Location in Tunisia
- Coordinates: 37°8′31.92″N 10°6′7.92″E
- Country: Tunisia
- Governorate: Bizerte Governorate

Population (2014)
  - Total: 5,126
- Time zone: UTC1 (CET)

Aousja also spelled Ousja or Aousdja (Tunisian Arabic: عوسجة) is a small town and commune located in Ghar El Melh district in the Bizerte Governorate of northern Tunisia, between El Alia and Ras Jebel, 48 kilometers north of Tunis. As of 2014 it had a population of 5,126 inhabitants.

60% of the male population of Aousja works in the culture of potatoes, their average salary being about 180 dinars per month. Since 1998 a potato festival has been held annually in July, to the producer of the largest potato is awarded.

Furthermore, 35% of women work in the textile industry.
