= Ras ben Sakka =

Northernmost point of Africa

- Cape
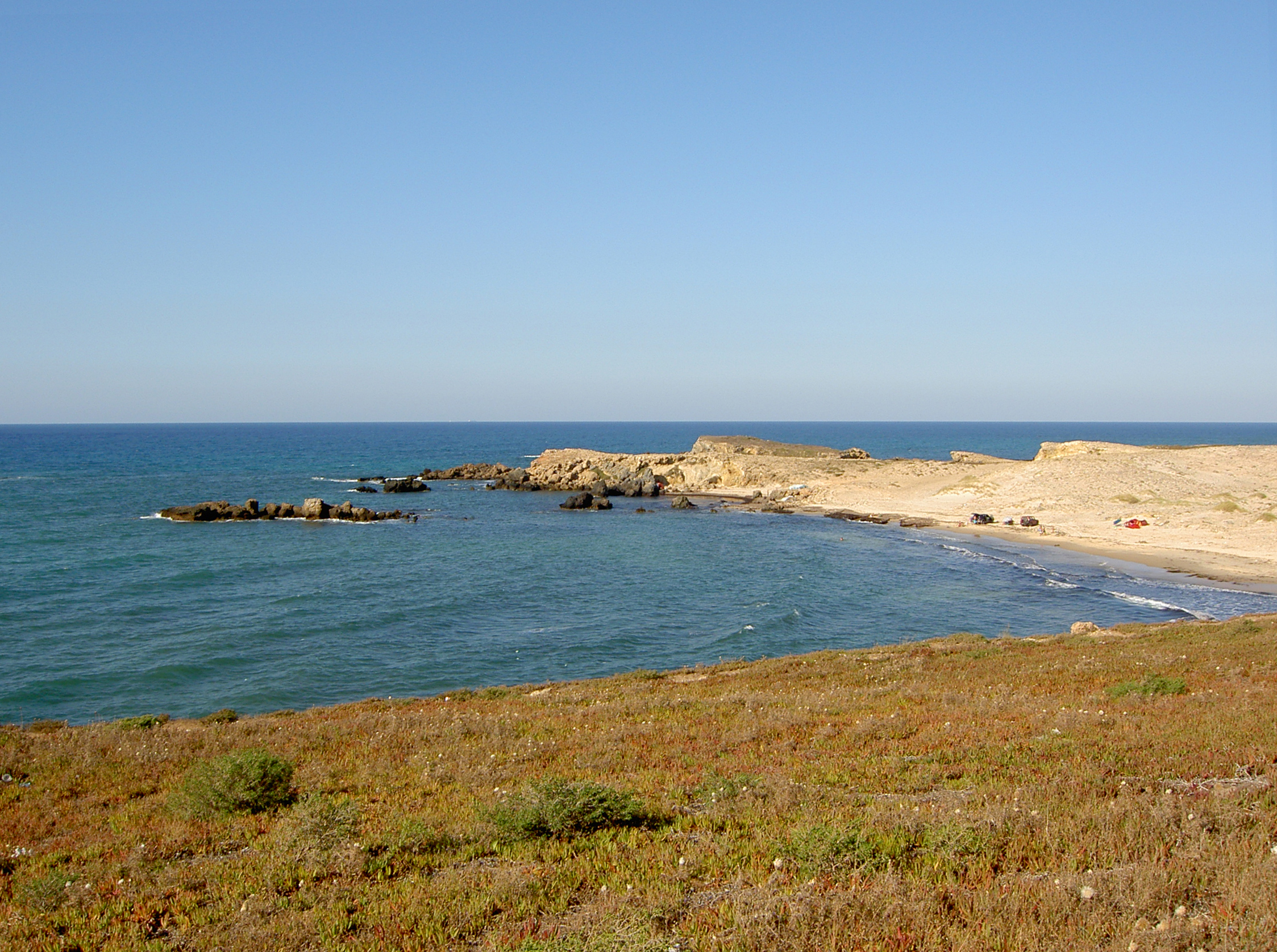
- Ras ben Sakka

- Location in Tunisia
- Coordinates: 37°20′49″N 9°45′17″E
- Location: Bizerte Governorate, Tunisia

Ras ben Sakka (Arabic: رأس بن سكة, lit. 'Cape ben Sakka'), the tip of Cape Angela in northern Tunisia, was considered the northernmost point of the African continent until 2014, when this was replaced by Cape Angela.

It is located 15 km (9.3 mi) from Bizerte and 22 km (14 mi) to the northeast of Ichkeul Lake World Heritage Site.

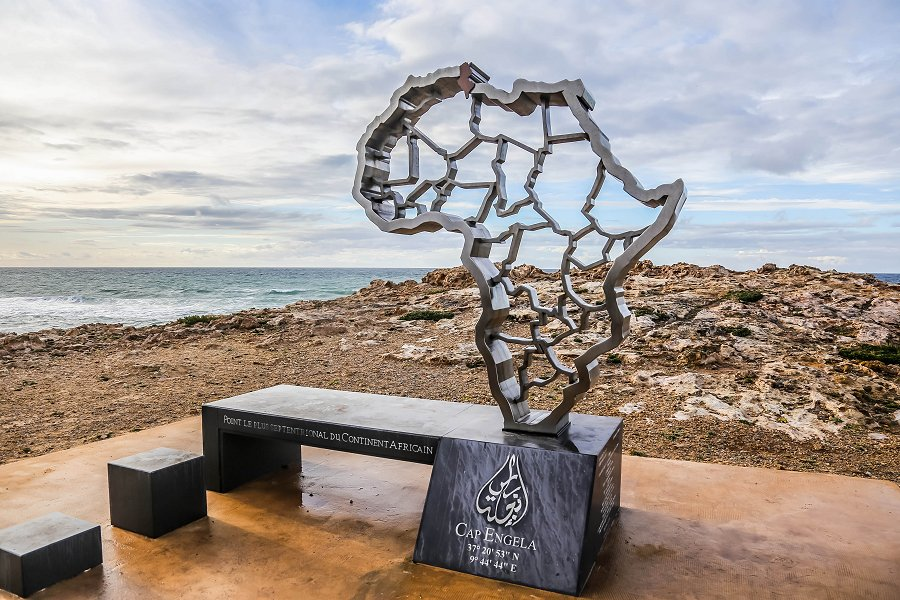
Monument

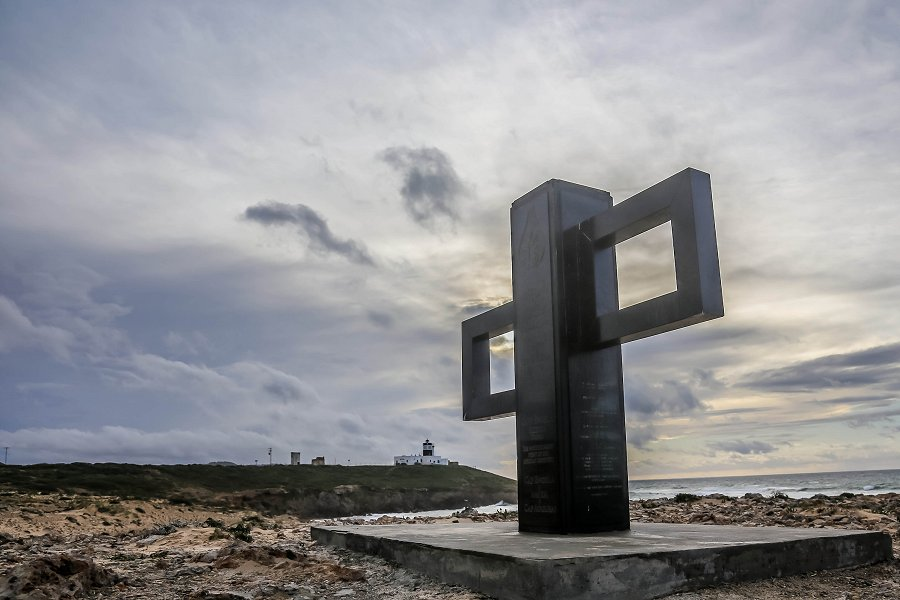
Monument
