= Mateur =

Mateur ماطر
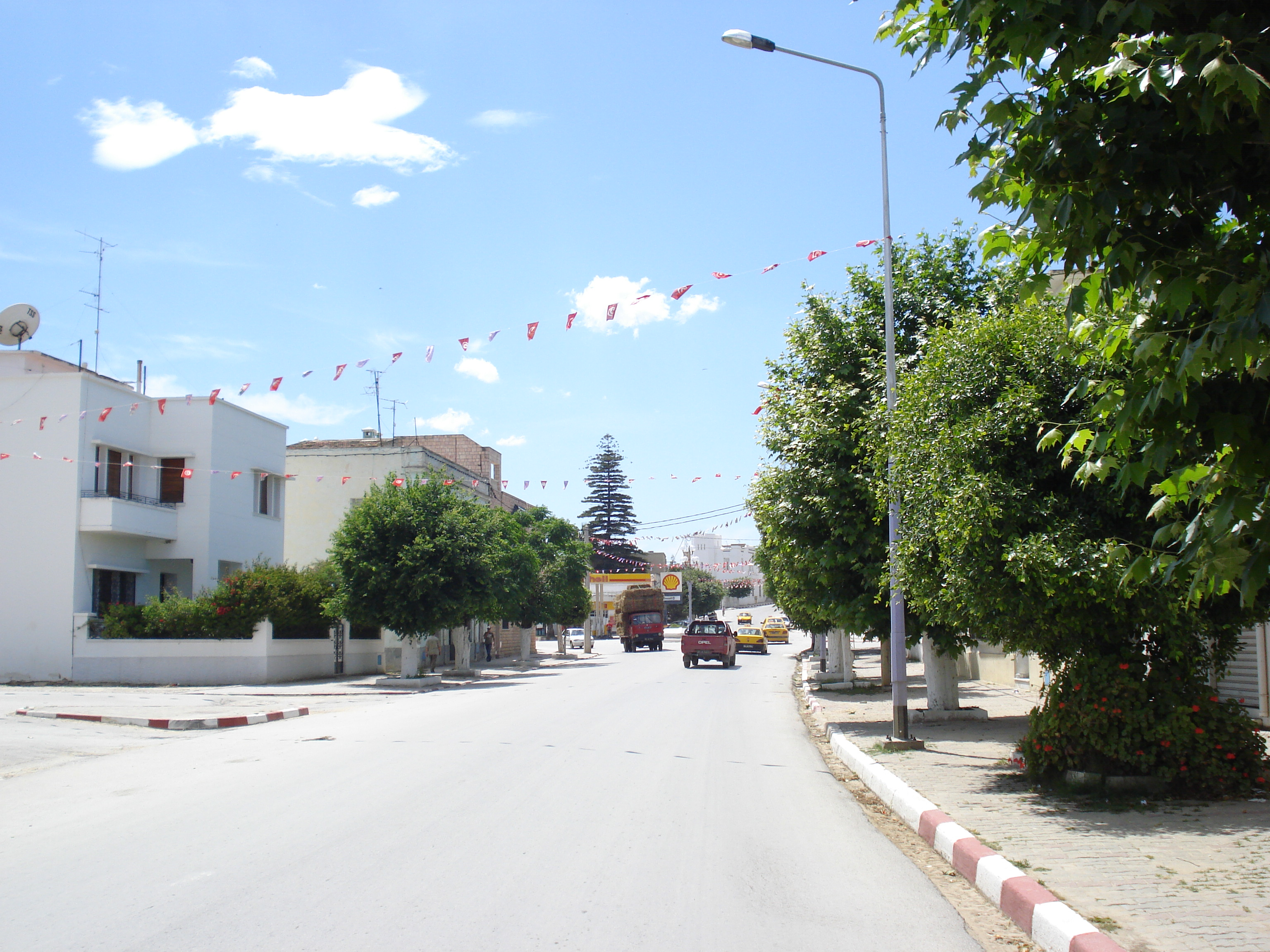

- Location in Tunisia
- Coordinates: 37°02′24″N 9°39′54″E
- Country: Tunisia
- Governorate: Bizerte Governorate

Government
  - Mayor: Jalel Touhami (Nidaa Tounes)

Population (2015)
  - Total: 32,546
- Time zone: UTC1 (CET)
- Postal code: 7030

Mateur (Tunisian Arabic: ماطر Mater) is a town in northern Tunisia. It is located at around 37°2′24″N 9°39′59″E, close to the Lac Ichkeul National Park.

== Overview ==
Located in the southwest of the governorate of Bizerte, Mateur is the county seat of a delegation of 61,919 inhabitants (2006) while its town counts 49,785 inhabitants divided in 8,735 families and occupy 7,120 accommodation, according to the magazine edited by the municipality of Mateur (edition 2006).

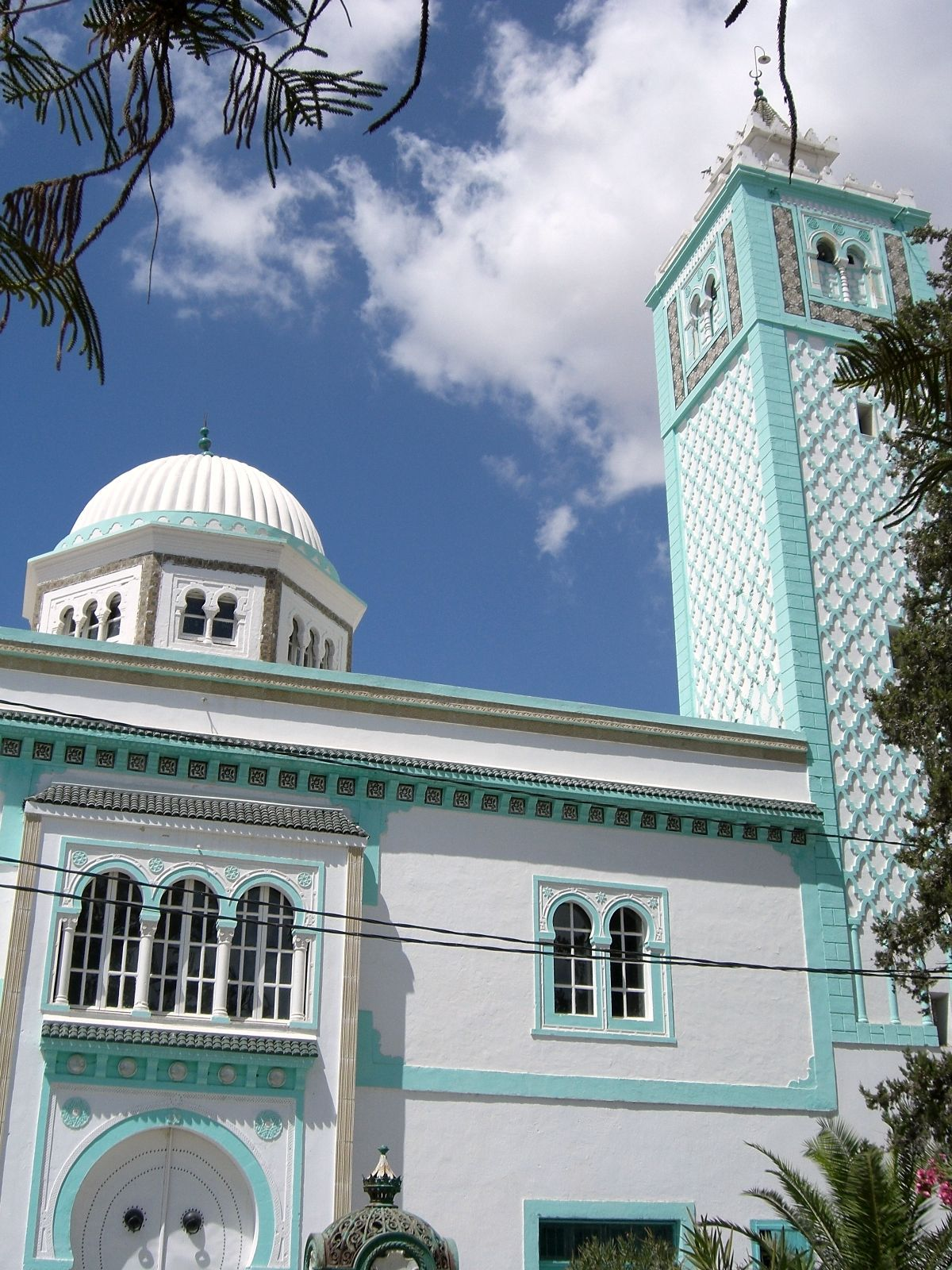
Sidi Bouthina mosque

Concerning the etymological root of the name of the city, some people see a Latin origin : Matarensis would have been the name of an oppidum located on the site of Mateur during the ancient period. It is also known in different epochs under other names as Materense, Matarus, Matari, Mataris, Matar and Mataritanae. On the other hand, the Arabists see a rapprochement with the term of Matra (in the plural Amtar) which means "precipitation", referring to the rainfall level of the region.

This city, the first town council of which is installed on October 12, 1898, was considered to be an important strategical point during the Second World War. It is to note that the municipality of Mateur celebrated the 110th birthday during year 2008.

The city is located in the middle of a first-rate agrarian region owing to the fecundity of the lands of the ambient lowland. An important market is held there every Friday and Saturday in the course of which they notably sell there the stock and grain. It unites producers of the neighbouring localities (Jefna, Joumine, Bazina, Sedjenane, Ghezala, etc.) and purchasers come from whole Tunisia. Mateur counts also 2 industrial zones where is installed about twenty foreign firms working in various areas: wiring, mechanics, telecommunications, textile industry, etc.

== National parks ==
Nearby is the national park of Ichkeul, which contains sites protected by many international institutions (UNESCO and WWF), owing to the diversity of its fauna and flora. It shelters the lake of the same name which is the biggest natural lake of North Africa.

== Education ==
Nowadays, the city has two establishments of higher education:

- Graduate school of agriculture
- Higher institute of applied sciences and technology (ISSAT Mateur)

== Population ==
2014 Census (Municipal)
Homes	Families	Males	Females	Total
9363	8333	15966	16526	32492
