= Metline =

- Commune and town
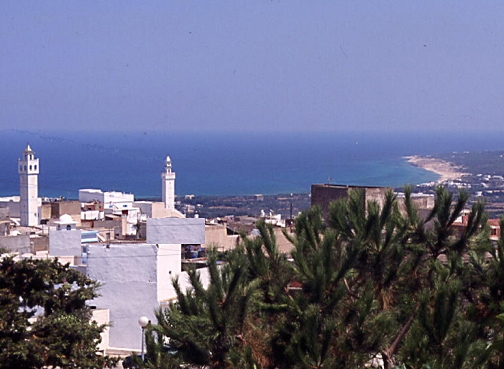

- Location within Tunisia
- Coordinates: 37°15′N 10°03′E
- Country: Tunisia
- Governorate: Bizerte Governorate

Population (2014)
  - Total: 9,904
- Time zone: UTC+1 (CET)

Metline (Tunisian Arabic: الماتلين) is a commune and town on the Mediterranean coast, in the Bizerte Governorate of northern Tunisia. As of 2004, it had a population of 7,370. It is located approximately 60 kilometres (37 mi) north of Tunis, 28 kilometres (17 mi) southeast of Bizerte and 6 kilometres (3.7 mi) northwest of Ras Jebel. The commune of Metline occupies a peninsula extending between the mountains, the sea and the forest, with a coastline of more than 6 kilometres (3.7 mi). Cape Zebib is 2 kilometres (1.2 mi) to the northeast. The commune was created on May 3, 1967.

== History ==
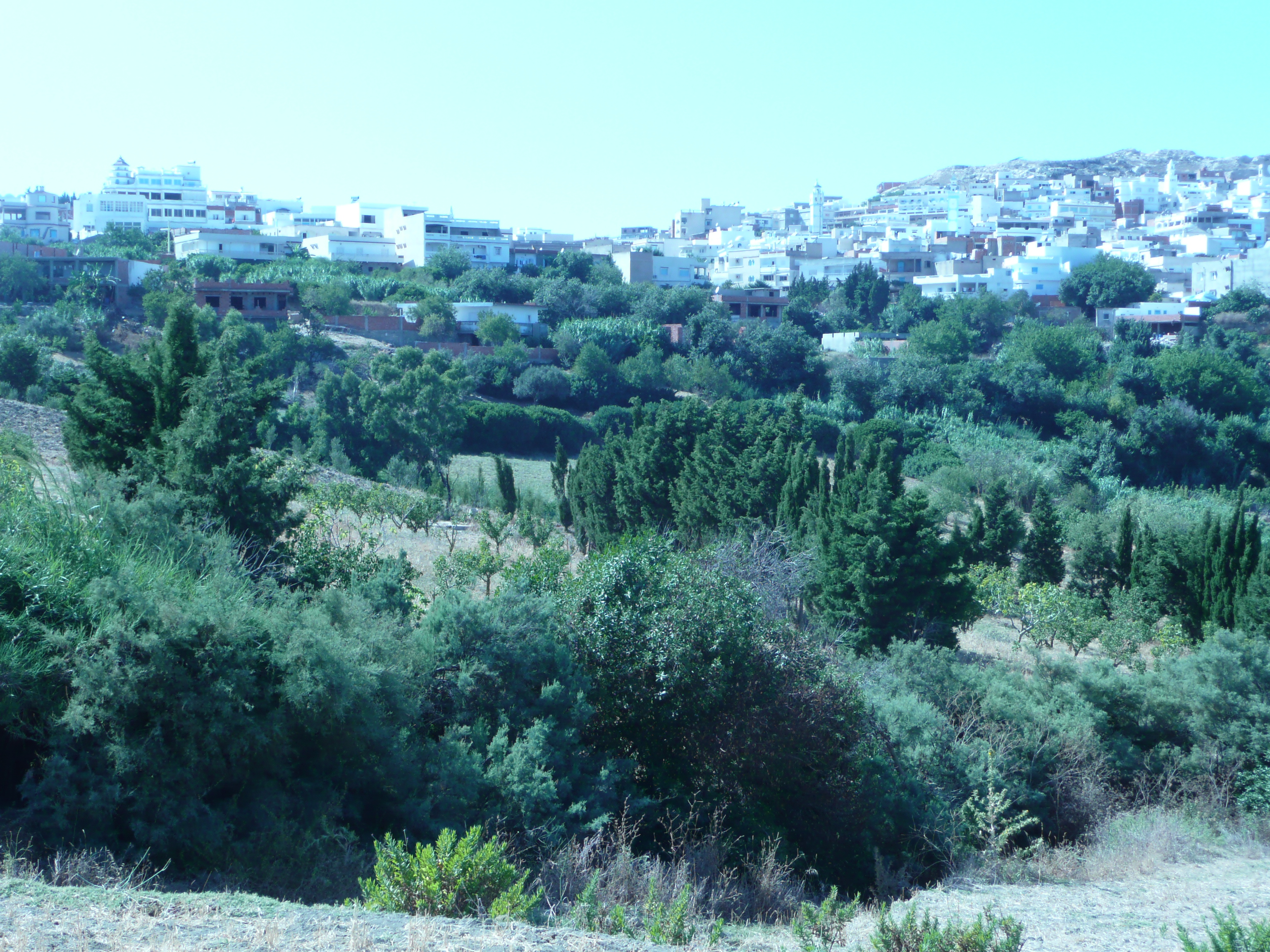

Founded in the sixteenth century, there are traces also of a Roman city, Benvenutum, as well as ninth century strongholds from the times of the Aghlabids dynasty. Metline fought against the Spanish during the 1534 and 1574 conquests. Ottoman soldiers settled in the area thereafter and may have lent the name Metline to the town as many of the soldiers were from Mytilene, Greece. At the beginning of the seventeenth century, a second wave of settlement brought Moors who were driven out of Andalusia when it was reconquered by the Catholics in 1492. A World War II battery at Metline consisted of two naval turrets.

== Economy ==
Metline has a small administrative center for services as it is a center for agricultural commercial operations of the surrounding countryside, including vegetables, wheat, and fodder. A small fishing harbor at Cape Zebib supports the local fishing industry. A festival in June honors the Spicara maena, called Chawri in Metline.Handmade embroidery in original and Ottoman motifs are of similar styles to those found in the former Ottoman territories of Eastern Europe. A wind farm project with 46 wind turbines was expected to be completed by 2011.

== Culture ==
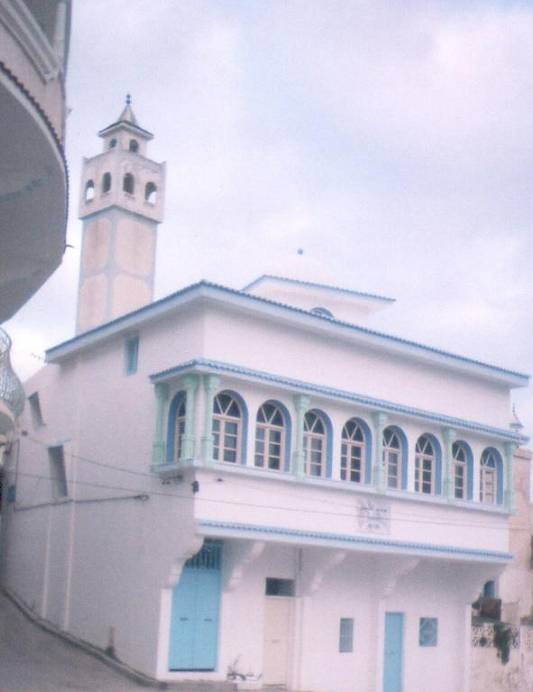
Grand Mosque of Metline

The population of Metline is Arab. Turkish loan words, such as that for violet (mor ou mour) and barracks (kichla) have entered the language; Greek loan words are also used, such as skala, meaning old port. Typical dishes include a traditional macaroni. The town, built on a steep slope, is known for its "cubic, terraced dwellings and arcaded streets in the Andalusian style", as is the nearby village of El Alia. The most prominent landmark is the Great Mosque of Metline, with its square minaret.

== See also ==
- List of cities in Tunisia
