= Sejnane =

- Commune and town
- Location within Tunisia
- Coordinates: 37°03′23″N 09°14′18″E
- Country: Tunisia
- Governorate: Bizerte Governorate
- Elevation: 230 m (750 ft)

Population (2014)
  - Total: 5,718
- Time zone: UTC+1 (CET)
- Postal code: 7010

Sejnane (Tunisian Arabic: سجنان Sījnān) is a town and commune in the Bizerte Governorate, Tunisia. As of 2004 it had a population of 4,737. Sejnane is known for its handmade pottery which are created by using methods from 3,000 years ago.

== See also ==
- List of cities in Tunisia
