= Ghezala =

Ghezala غزالة
- Location in Tunisia
- Coordinates: 37°05′02″N 9°32′08″E
- Country: Tunisia
- Governorate: Bizerte Governorate

Population (2004)
  - Total: 5,490
- Time zone: UTC1 (CET)

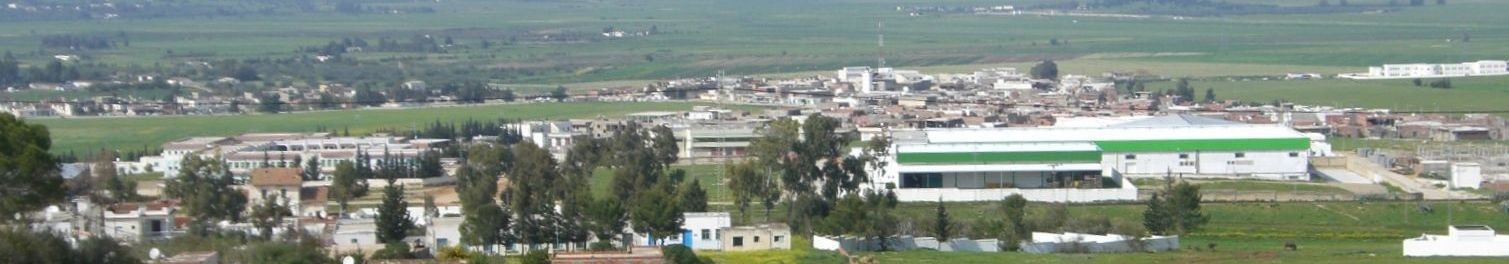
Ghezala's Panorama

Ghezala is a town of north-western Tunisia located at 50 kilometres west of Bizerte and 70 kilometres northwest of Tunis.

Attached to the Bizerte Governorate, it is the administrative seat of Ghezala Delegation which has 27,799 inhabitants while the town counts a population of 5,490 inhabitants.
