= Turki (Tunisia) =

- Imada and town
- Turki
- Interactive map of Turki
- Coordinates: 36°34′29″N 10°30′57″E
- Country: Tunisia
- Governorate: Nabeul Governorate

Population
  - Total: 3,661
- Time zone: UTC+1

Turki (Arabic: تركي) is a Tunisian village dependent on the Nabeul Governorate and the delegation of Grombalia.

== Transport ==
The A1 motorway is nearby.

== Geography ==
It is located around forty kilometers south-east of Tunis and around twenty kilometers north-west of Nabeul. Grombalia, the chief town of the municipality and the delegation, is about two kilometers northwest of the city.

Turki lies on a plain near Grombalia, at the western end of the Cape Bon peninsula.

== History ==
The village was discovered and founded in the 1900s after the Azuna family migrated from the Ottoman's oppression. The clan name was later changed to Turki.

Its last family member was Hassouna Turki. The village now counts approximately 4000 inhabitants.

== See also ==
- Nabeul
