= Chechia =

Traditional headgear worn in the Maghreb

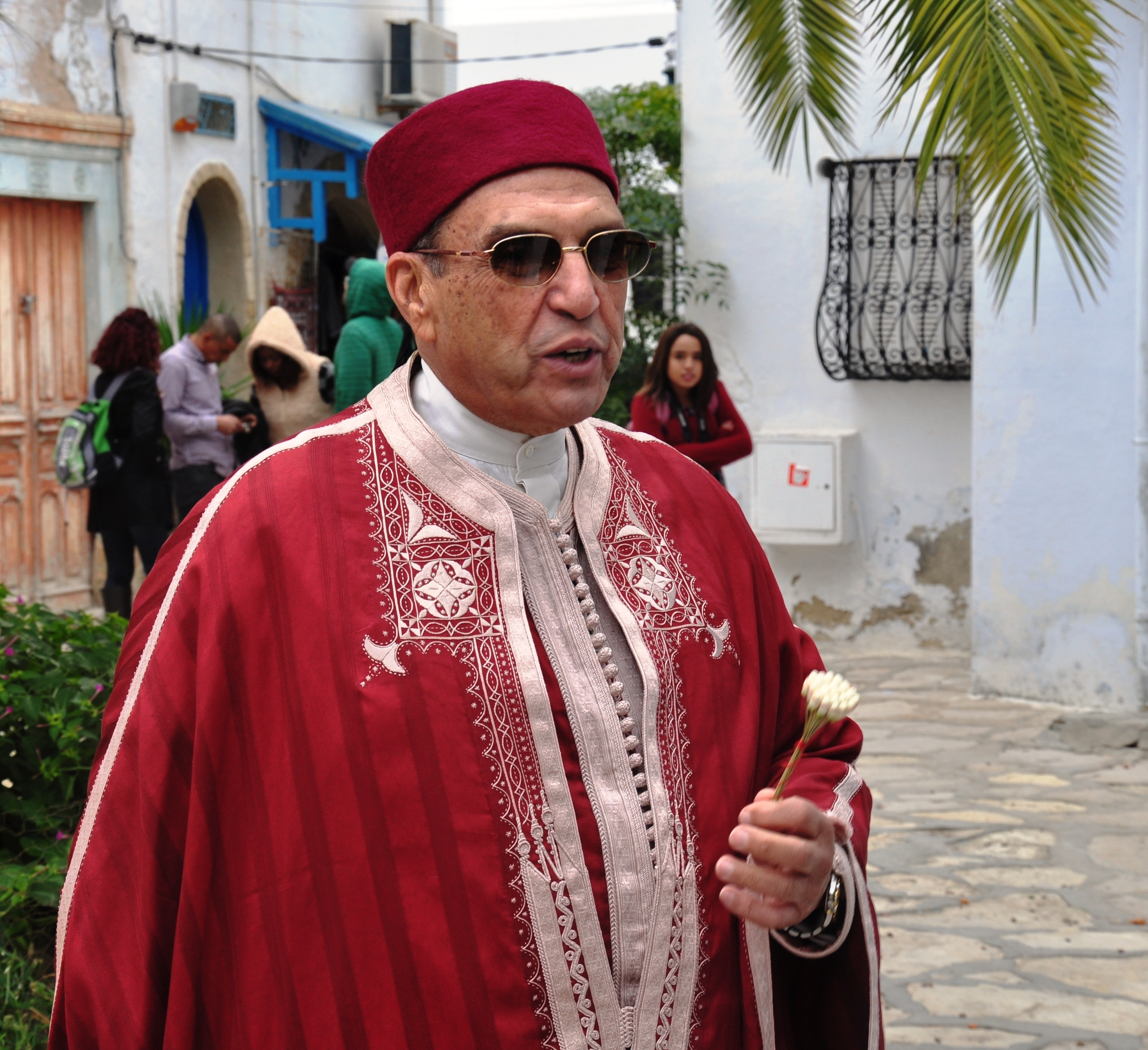
Tunisian man wearing a chechia

The chechia (Arabic: شاشية [ʃɛːʃiæ]) is a traditional headgear worn in North Africa. Close relative to the European beret, the chechia was originally a cap-shaped bonnet, colored vermillon red. Until the 19th century, the chechia was often worn surrounded by a turban.

The chechia, which is flexible, should not be confused with the fez (known in the Maghreb as chéchia stambouli) which is rigid, conical and high in shape. The word chechia also designates the long soft cap, adopted by certain French colonial military forces, such as: the zouaves, the tirailleurs and the spahis.

== Etymology ==
The word chechia designates in the Maghreb the cap that is placed on the head and around which a piece of cloth has been rolled for a long time to form the turban. According to the Maghrebi traveler and explorer ibn Battuta during his stay in Shiraz in 1327, the word chechia itself takes its name however from the adjective derived from Shash, name of the current Tashkent in Uzbekistan:

"The next day, an envoy from the King of Irak, sultan Abou-Saïd Bahadour, arrived near the sheikh: it was Nâcir eddîn Addarkandy, one of the main emirs, originally from Khorâçân. When he approached the sheikh, he took off his head his chachiiah, which the Persians call "cala".

== History ==
=== Origins ===
It is believed that the chechia originated in Uzbekistan. Unlike the fez, the chechia is shorter and crafted from less stiff material, and is, therefore, softer and more pliable. By the 17th century that the chaouachis, or chechia makers, had spread to the capital Tunis, the capital of Tunisia. By the 21st century, the procedure for making them remains the same, but the number of craftsmen who make them has decreased. While the market place in the Souk Ech-Chaouachine, hosted about 30,000 chaouachis at its peak, that number had dropped by the 2010s to about 20, who struggle to keep the business alive. The modern chechia business is estimated to create jobs for over 2,000 artisans, with the remaining chechias are sold overseas, primarily to Libya, Nigeria, and Niger. Chechia colours vary by country. It is red in Tunisia, and sometimes lacks a tassel. In Libya, the chechia is normally black, except the Benghazi version, or "chenna," which is also red and includes a tassel. In Morocco, and some parts of Tunisia, it can also be seen in white or grey.

The archives of the Spanish consulate to the Beylik of Tunis at the end of the 18th century show that Spain was interested in the manufacture of chechias, the secret of which it lost when the Moriscos were expelled at the beginning of the 17th century and that the Spanish government would like to recover to relaunch its production in Spain in state factories.

In Tunisia, anyone wishing to practise this craft must first pass a rigorous examination before a designated committee of artisans. Made by skilled chaouachis, the chechia became a prominent feature of the souks, established in 1691 in the Medina of Tunis,.Its growing popularity sustained a thriving trade that provided employment for thousands of people.

From the 1920s, Tunisian separatists increasingly wore the chechia testouriya (originally from the city of Testour) because its name was close to that of their party the Destour.

=== Crafts in crisis ===
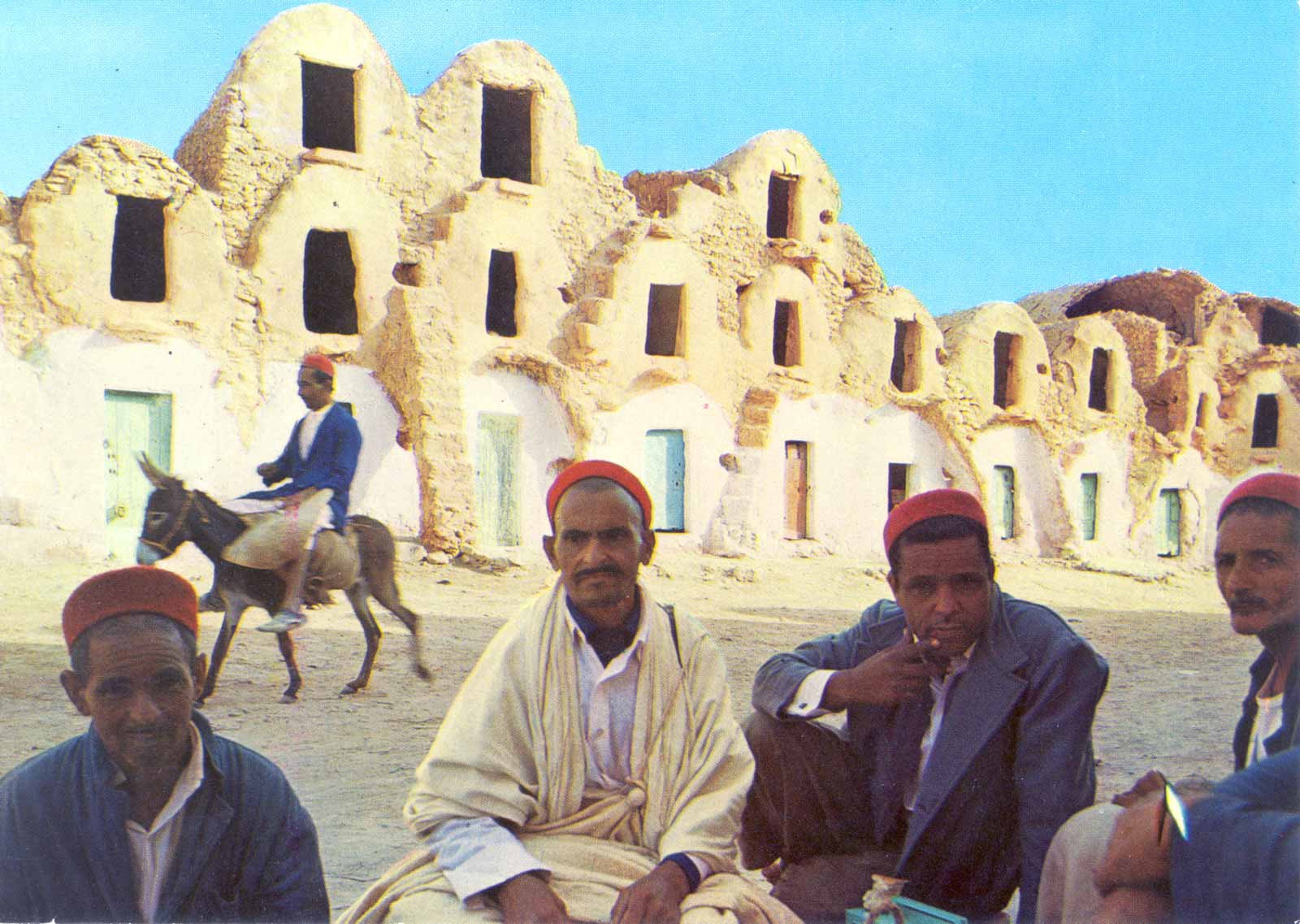
Inhabitants of Medenine wearing the chechia

After Tunisia's independence in 1956, with the arrival of manufactures and customs from Europe, the wearing of the chechia tended to be limited to holidays and religious festivals; it is often associated with elderly people. Manufacturers' incomes were affected and many were forced to give up this craft. Moreover, people living in the countryside tend to abandon this traditional headgear in favor of its less expensive and industrially manufactured equivalents. The absence of a coherent government program contributes to this decline in the eyes of traditionalists.

Moreover, many specialists attribute the decline of this craft to the manufacturers themselves, who lacked creativity and innovation. However, at the end of the 1990s, in an effort to revitalize this industry, many artisans began to manufacture new varieties of chechias in different colors, shapes and decorations, in order to attract a younger clientele. However, very quickly, this momentum wanes as exports of the Tunisian chechia to African countries also run out of steam.

However, official figures given in 2007 by the Tunisian Bureau of Traditional Industries indicate that 80% of chechias are exported to Algeria, Libya and Nigeria, but also throughout the Near East and as far as Asia.

== Fabrication ==
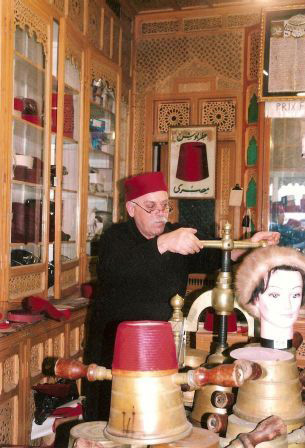
Workshop of a Tunisian chaouachi

The traditional chechia is made of combed wool, knitted by women. The caps are then sent to the fulling. They are wetted with hot water and soap and trodden under foot by men in order to soak them, so that the stitches of the knitting almost disappear. Then comes the treatment of the thistle, which is used for carding or combing the hat, in order to transform the felt into downy velvet. However, more and more often, the thistle is replaced by a wire brush. It is at this stage of manufacture that the chechia is tinted with its famous vermilion red color.

Division of labor and geographical distribution allow its artisanal production on a large scale while maintaining the quality that makes the reputation of the chechia of Tunis. A dozen people, including a third of women, participate in its manufacture in several points of the country chosen according to their human resources or material resources:

- wool spinning : Djerba and Gafsa
- knitting : Ariana (by specialized women called "kabbasat")
- fulling : El Battan (in the waters of the Medjerda)
- carding : El Alia (of which the thistle is from)
- dyeing : Zaghouan
- shaping : Tunis
- finishes : Tunis

Water quality plays an important role, hence the different choices for fulling and dyeing.

== See also ==
- List of headgear
