= Balgha =

Heelless leather slippers made from Northwest Africa

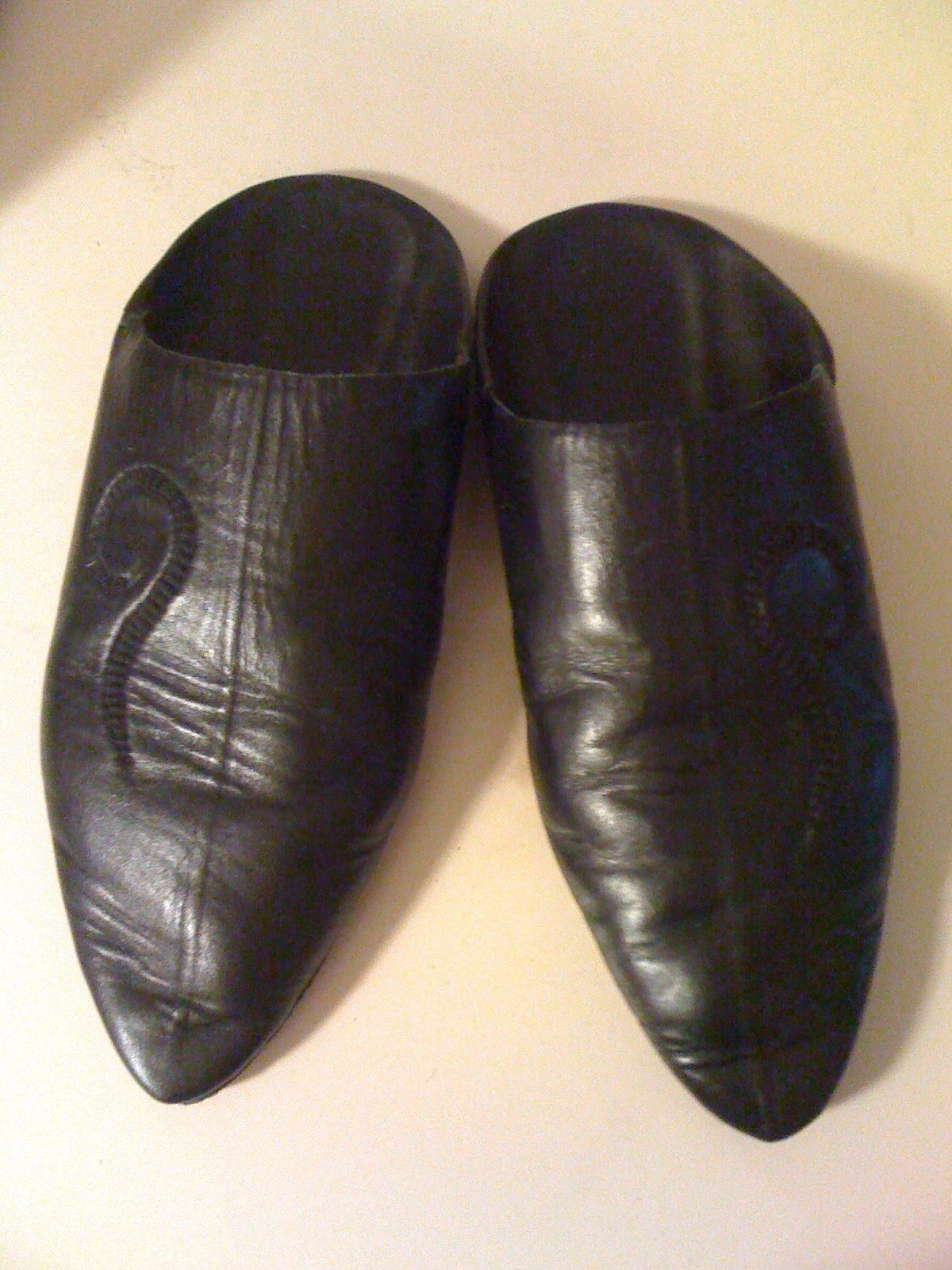
A pair of black balghas.

Balgha (Arabic: البلغة, romanized: al-balgha), also spelled balga, belgha, or belga, are heelless slippers made from leather. They are part of traditional dresses of the Maghreb and Egypt.

Balghas are worn by men and women of all social classes, both in urban and rural areas.

It is also known a Babouche Slippers by Moroccans. In Morocco, they are seen as luxury footwear and are available in various colors, materials and patterns.

== See also ==
- List of shoe styles
