= Raf Raf =

Coordinates: 37.189°N 10.1946°E

- Commune and town
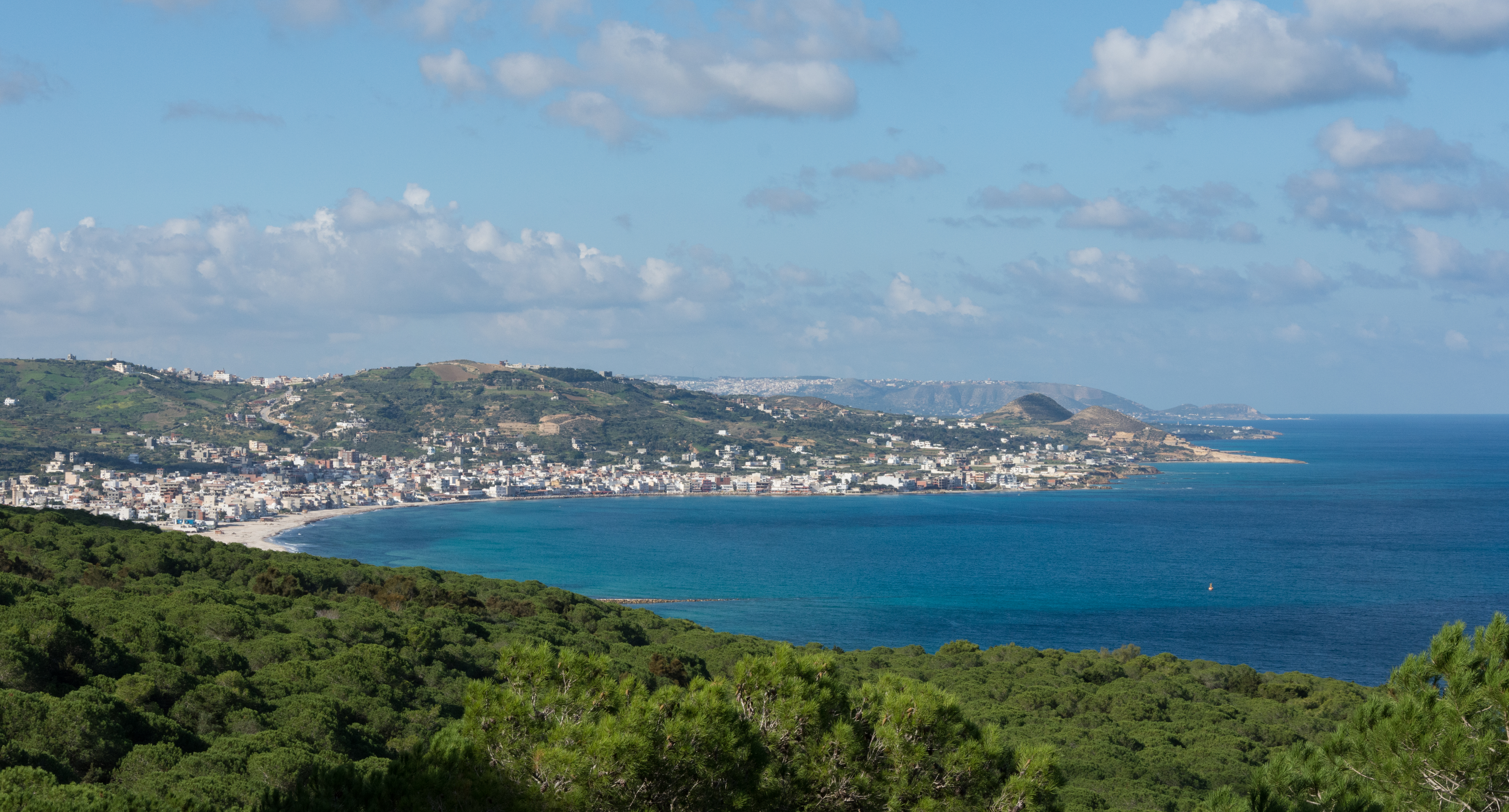
- Interactive map of Raf Raf
- Country: Tunisia
- Governorate: Bizerte Governorate

Population (2014)
  - Total: 9,850
- Time zone: UTC+1 (CET)

Raf Raf is a north eastern town and commune in the Bizerte Governorate, Tunisia. As of 2004 it had a population of 9,839.

== See also ==
- List of cities in Tunisia

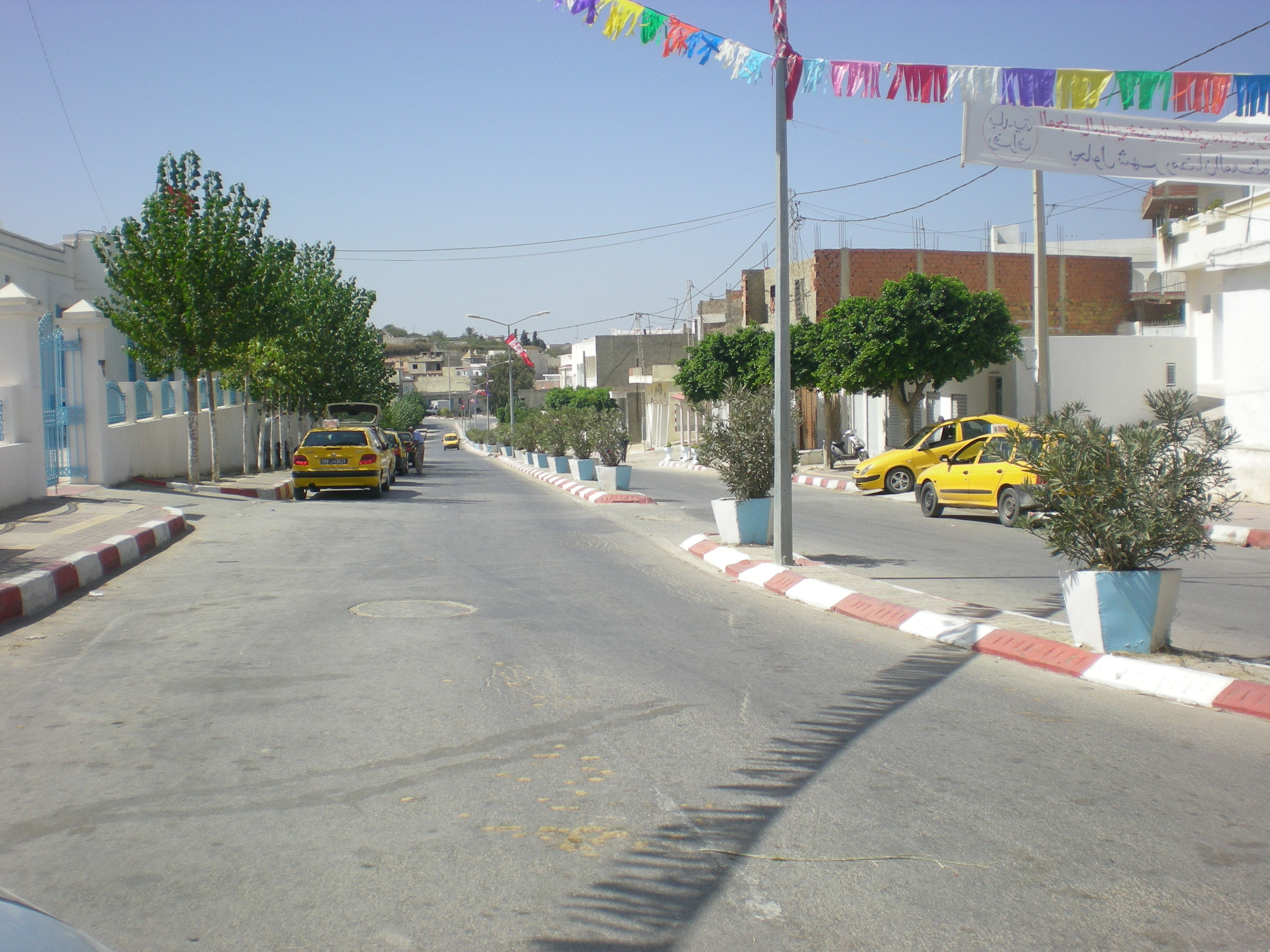
Main Street

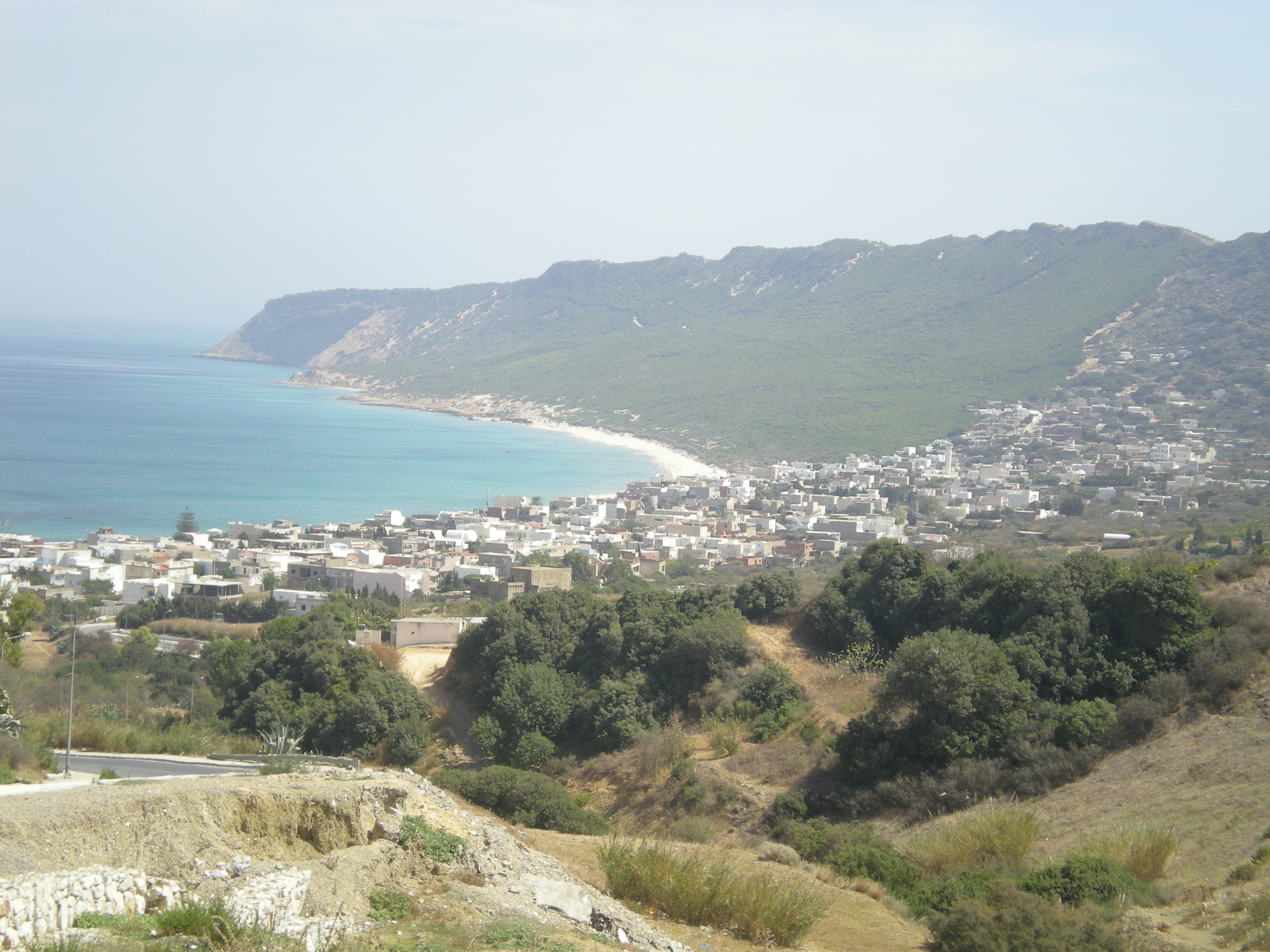
