= Lake Ichkeul =

Lake in northern Tunisia

Ichkeul National Park
- IUCN category II (national park)
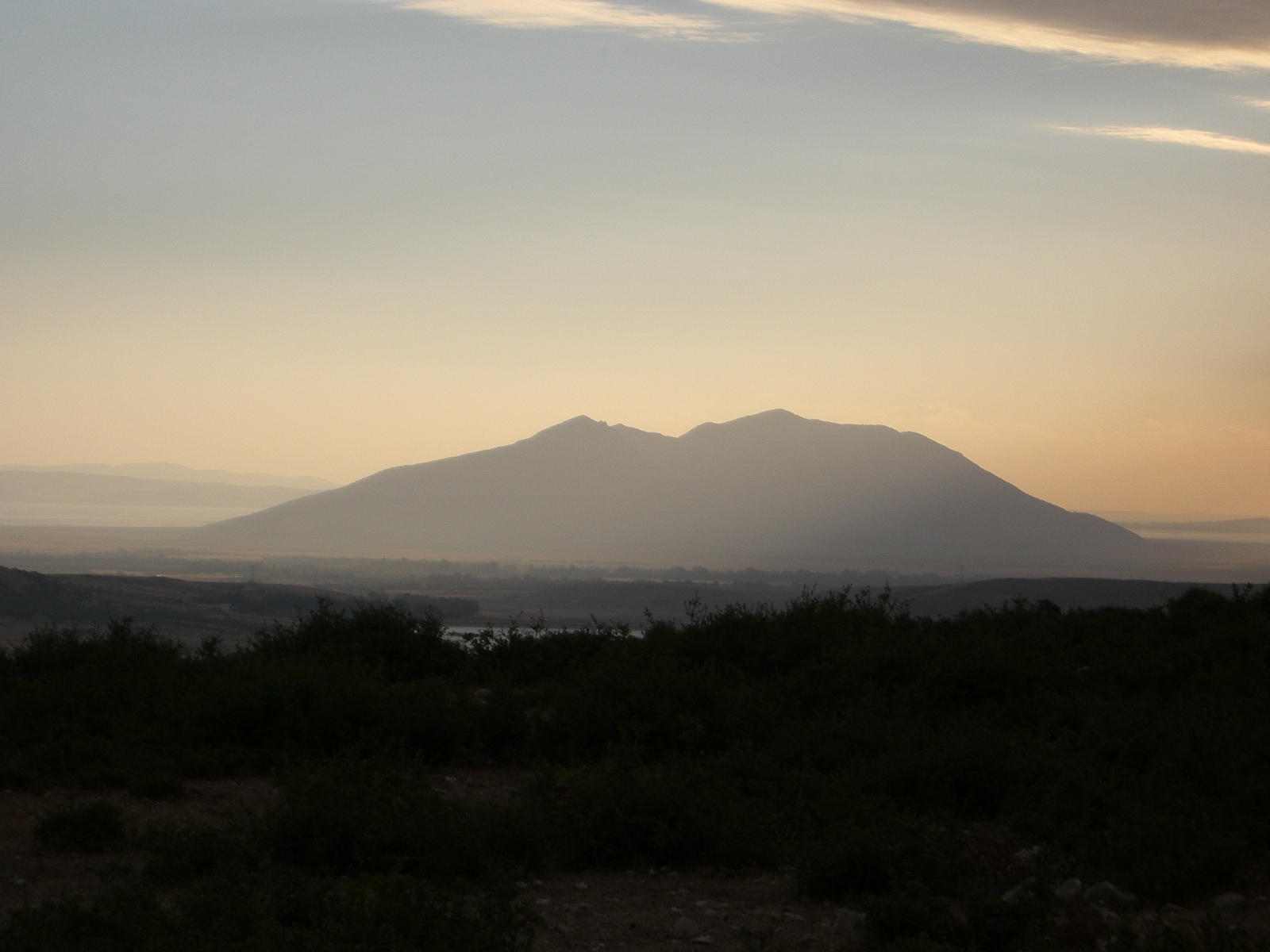
- Ichkeul mountain

- Location within Tunisia
- Location: Tunisia
- Nearest city: Mateur
- Coordinates: 37°7′24″N 9°39′20″E
- Area: 126 km^{2} (49 sq mi)
- Established: 1980

UNESCO World Heritage Site
- Type: Natural
- Criteria: x
- Designated: 1980 (4th session)
- Reference no.: 8
- Region: Africa
- Endangered: 1996–2006

Ramsar Wetland
- Official name: Ichkeul
- Designated: 24 November 1980
- Reference no.: 213

Lake Ichkeul (Arabic: بحيرة اشكل, romanized: Buḥayra ʾIshkul) is a lake in northern Tunisia, located 20 kilometres (12 miles) to Bizerte, the northernmost city in Africa on the Mediterranean Sea. The lake and wetlands of Ichkeul National Park are an important stopping-over point for hundreds of thousands of migrating birds each year. Among the lake's visitors are ducks, geese, storks, and pink flamingoes. Dam construction on the lake's feeder rivers has produced major changes to the ecological balance of the lake and wetlands.

== History ==
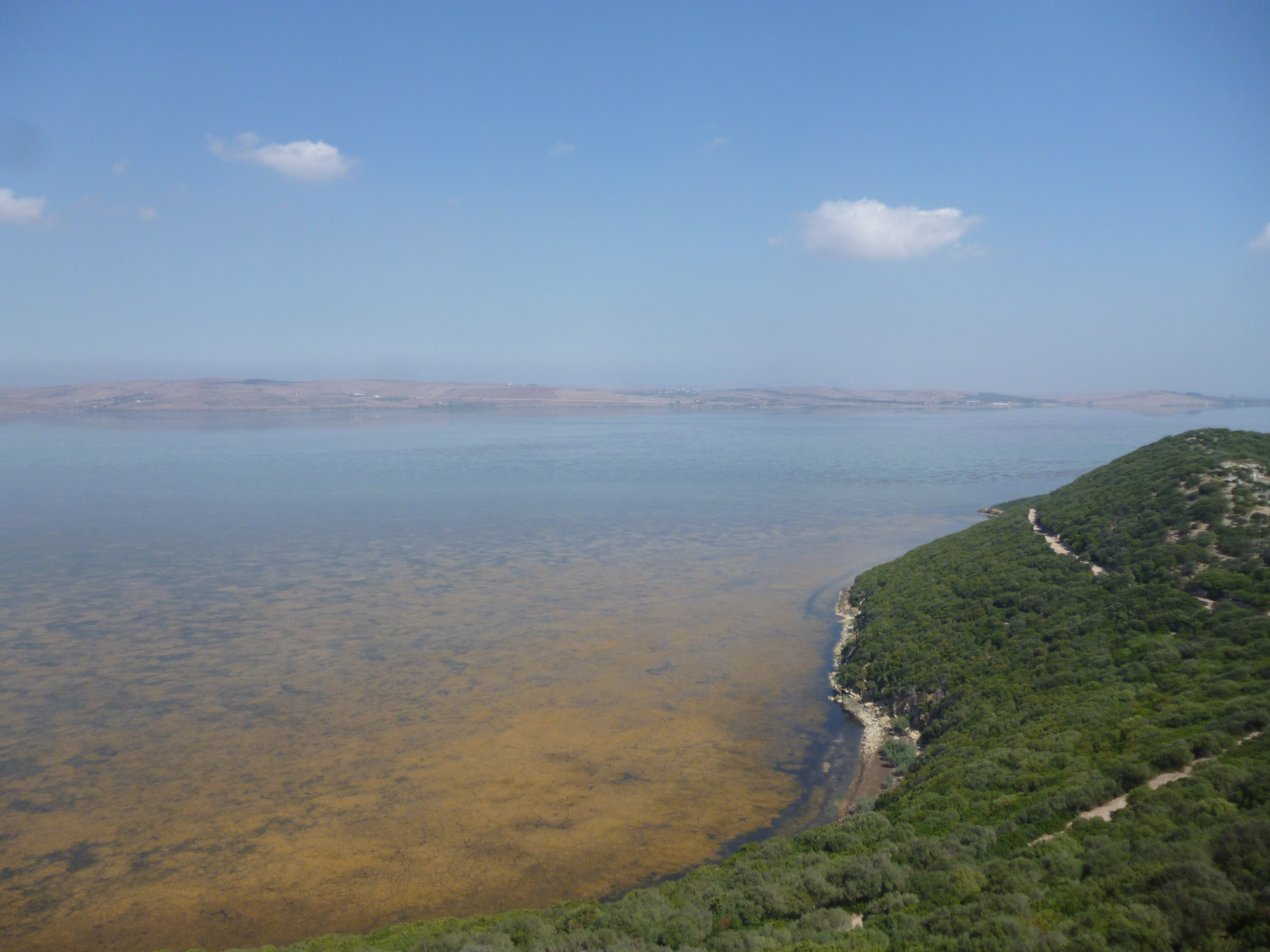
Lake Ichkeul

In the reign of the Hafsid dynasty, Lake Ichkuel was a reserve during the 13th century. It later became the property of the public domain in the early 20th century during French rule. Since 1980, it has been a UNESCO World Heritage Site.

Because dams have sharply reduced the freshwater inflow to the lakes and marshes, the reedbeds, sedges, and other fresh-water plant species have been replaced with salt-loving plants. These changes have produced a sharp reduction in the migratory bird populations, which depend on the mix of plants that used to exist.

According to the UNESCO Website, the Tunisian government has undertaken some steps to retain freshwater and reduce salinity, and the lake was removed from UNESCO's list of World heritage in danger in 2006.

However some reports from the World Conservation Union suggest that the salinity has already become excessively high and the possibility for rehabilitation may be rapidly disappearing.

== Ichkeul National Park ==
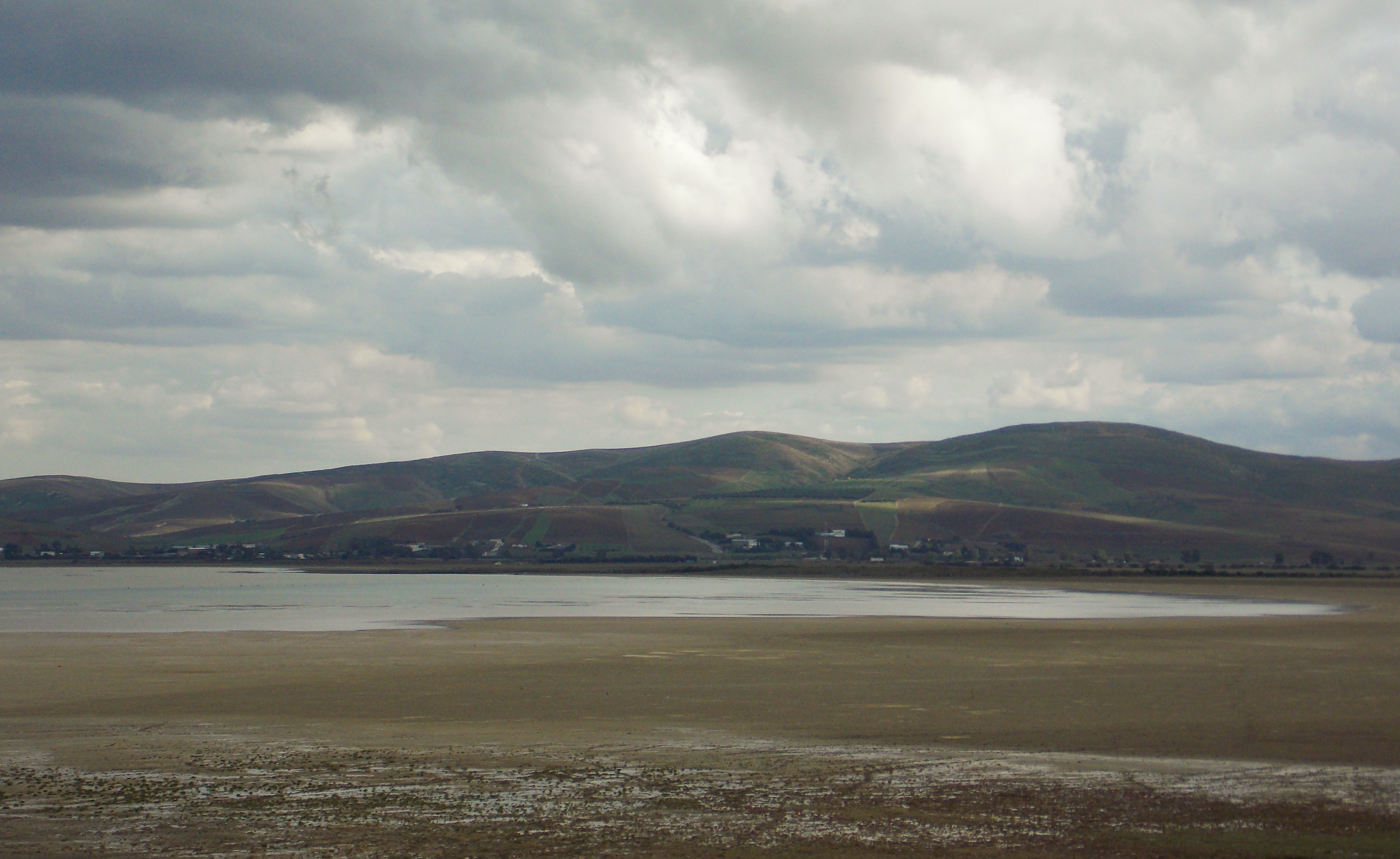
Ichkeul National Park, World Heritage Site in Tunisia.

Ichkeul National Park is a World Heritage Site located in the north of Tunisia, 25 km southwest of Bizerte and 15 km north of Mateur. The park has been on the UNESCO list of World Heritage Sites since 1980, and between 1996 and 2006 the park has also been on the group's list of World Heritage in Danger. The park is managed by the Tunisian Ministry of Agriculture.

The flowering plant Teucrium_schoenenbergeri Nabli found only in Tunisia was harvested in 1965 in the Park.

== Gallery ==
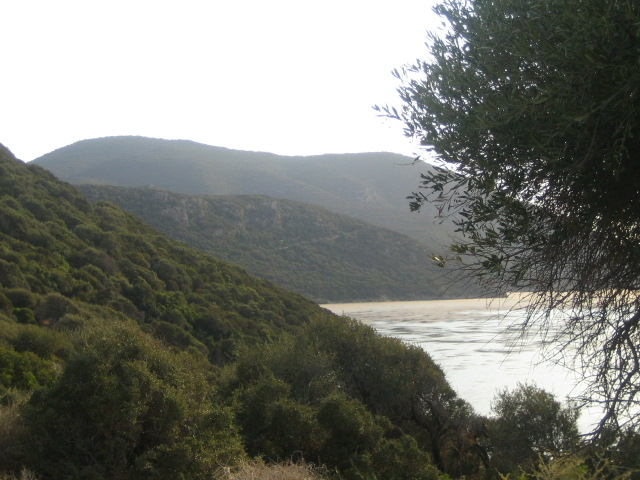
View of Ichkeul National Park

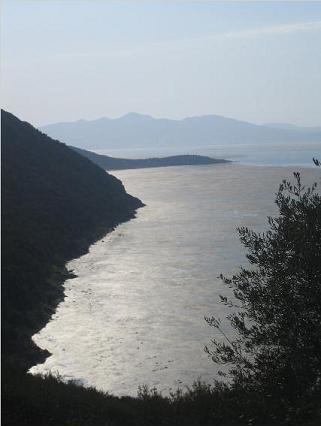
Lake landscape

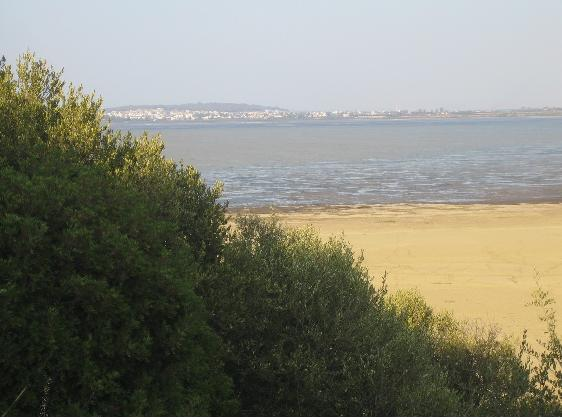
Lakefront
