= Ras Jebel =

Coordinates: 37.215°N 10.12°E

Ras El jebel رأس الجبل Ras el-Jebel
- Commune and town
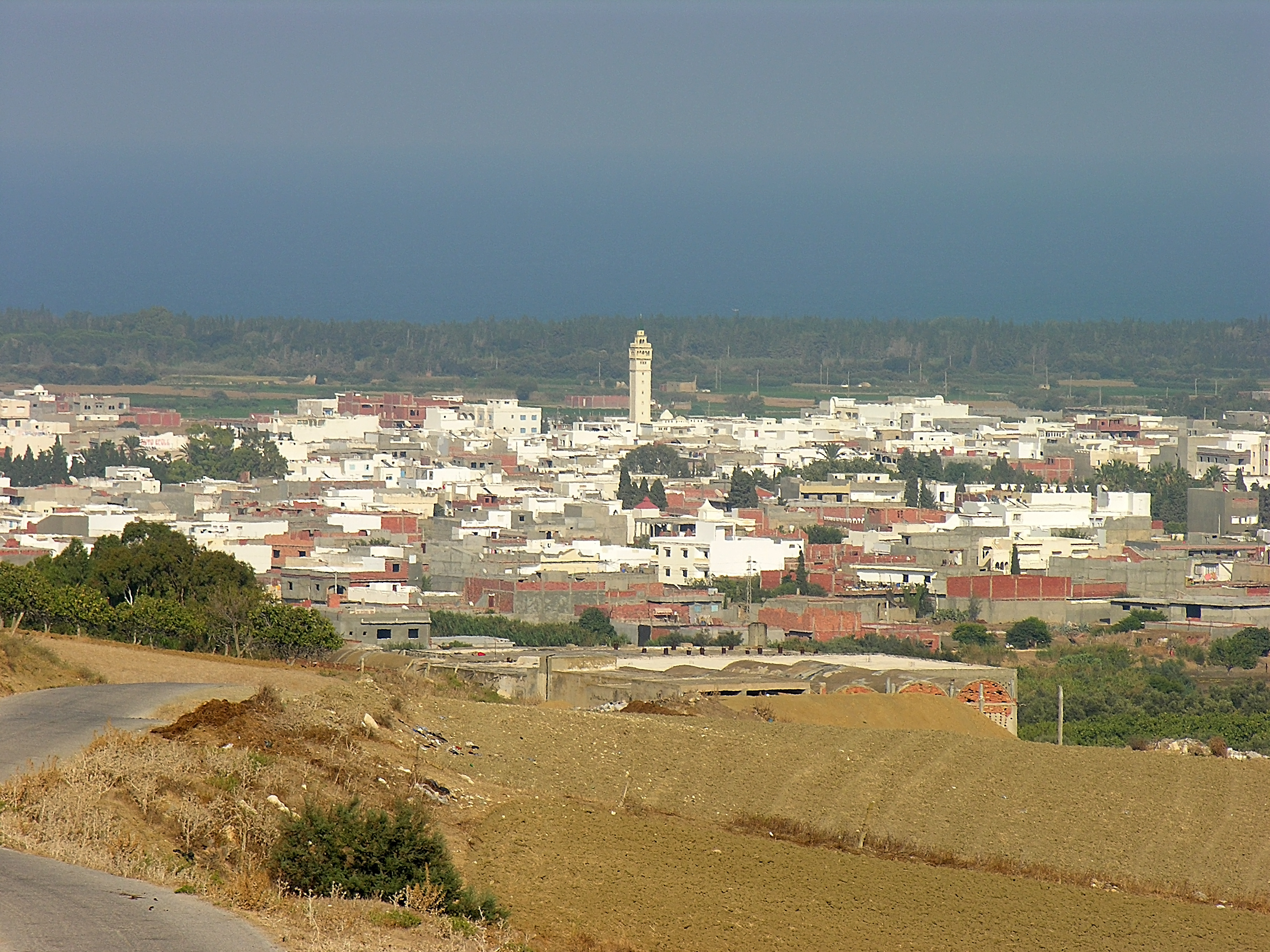
- Ras Jebel
- Interactive map of Ras El jebel
- Country: Tunisia
- Governorate: Bizerte Governorate

Population (2022)
  - Total: 31,574
- Time zone: UTC+1 (CET)

Ras Jebel, also known as Ras el-Djebel, anciently known as Thunisa, is a town and commune in the Bizerte Governorate of Tunisia. The name of the city refers to the summit or end of the mountain, thus evoking the end of the Atlas Mountains.

== Geography ==
Ras Jebel is set on a hill overlooking the Mediterranean Sea. It has an altitude of 53 meters (174 ft).

== History ==
During the Roman Empire the town, founded in the 3rd or 4th century, was a civitas of the Roman Province of Africa and was the seat of an ancient Christian bishopric, which survives today as a titular see of the Roman Catholic Church. It appears on the Peutinger Map. There is a set of ruins of the Roman era town of El Rhettas, 7km to the west.

Towards the second half of the 14th century, the Muslim Andalusians expelled from Spain would have settled on the site after having benefited from agricultural concessions. The inhabitants of the town carry Ghwalbia's gentile in reference to the Arab tribe of Banou Ghalib from the Spanish region of Zaragoza, whence the majority of the first wave of refugee Moriscos that settled in Ras Jebel originated. A road linking the port of Carthage to the region of Ras Jebel is called "Qalat el-Andalus" (Citadel of the Andalusians).

== Demography ==
In 1956 the population of the village was 10 thousand and in 1975 was 15 thousand people. As of 2004 the commune had a population of 25,553.

== Economy ==
Historically, the region around Ras Jebel has been predominantly peasant agriculture. Irrigation from the Medjerda has led to benefits in yields. Ras Jebel is one of the villages with Andalusian traditions where intensive farming dates back to the distant past. Agriculture has become progressively market-oriented and uses increasingly intensive techniques (market gardening and fruit-growing irrigation as well as intensive livestock farming).

75% of Ras Jebel farms have an area of less than five hectares.

Over the last decades, a textile industry has been established in the outskirts of the city. The first plants to be established are those of Lee Cooper. This industry employs a large number of young workers from Ras Jebel and neighboring villages. Several brands have already produced jeans in Ras Jebel such as Pepe Jeans, Joseph, Le temps des cerises.

== Gallery ==
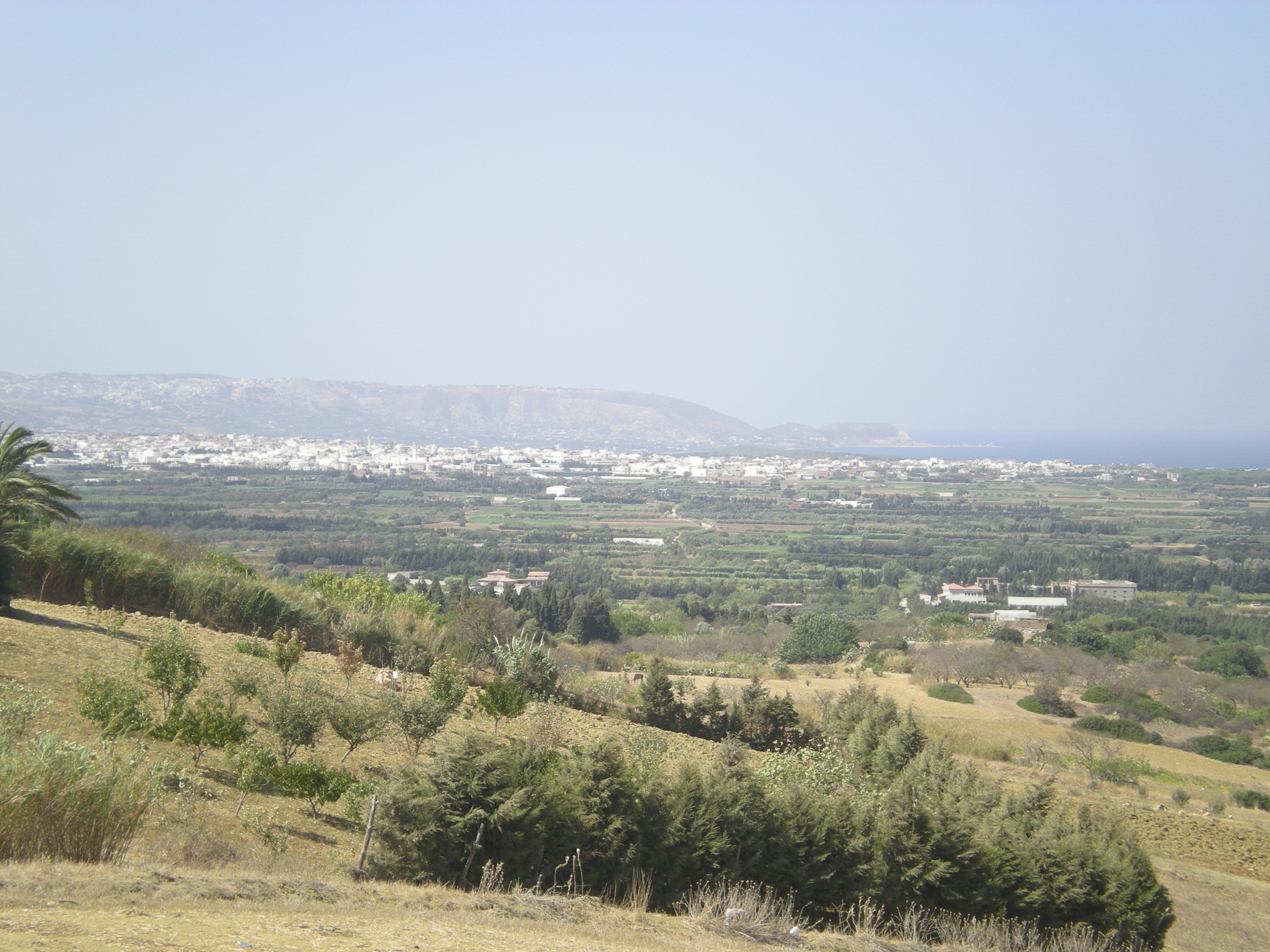
Plain

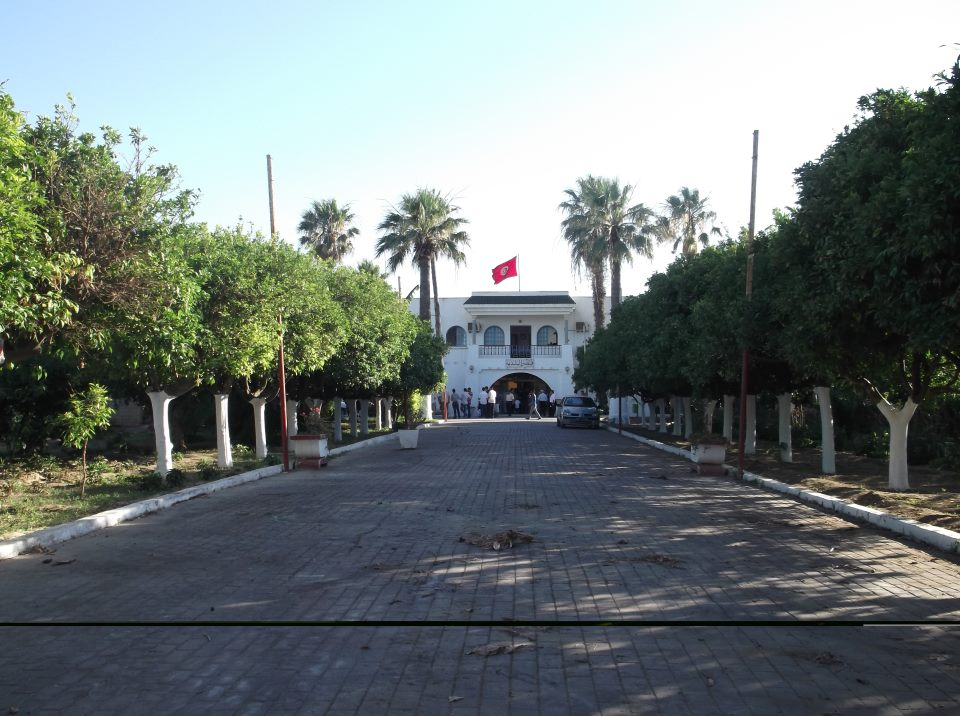
Siège de la municipalité

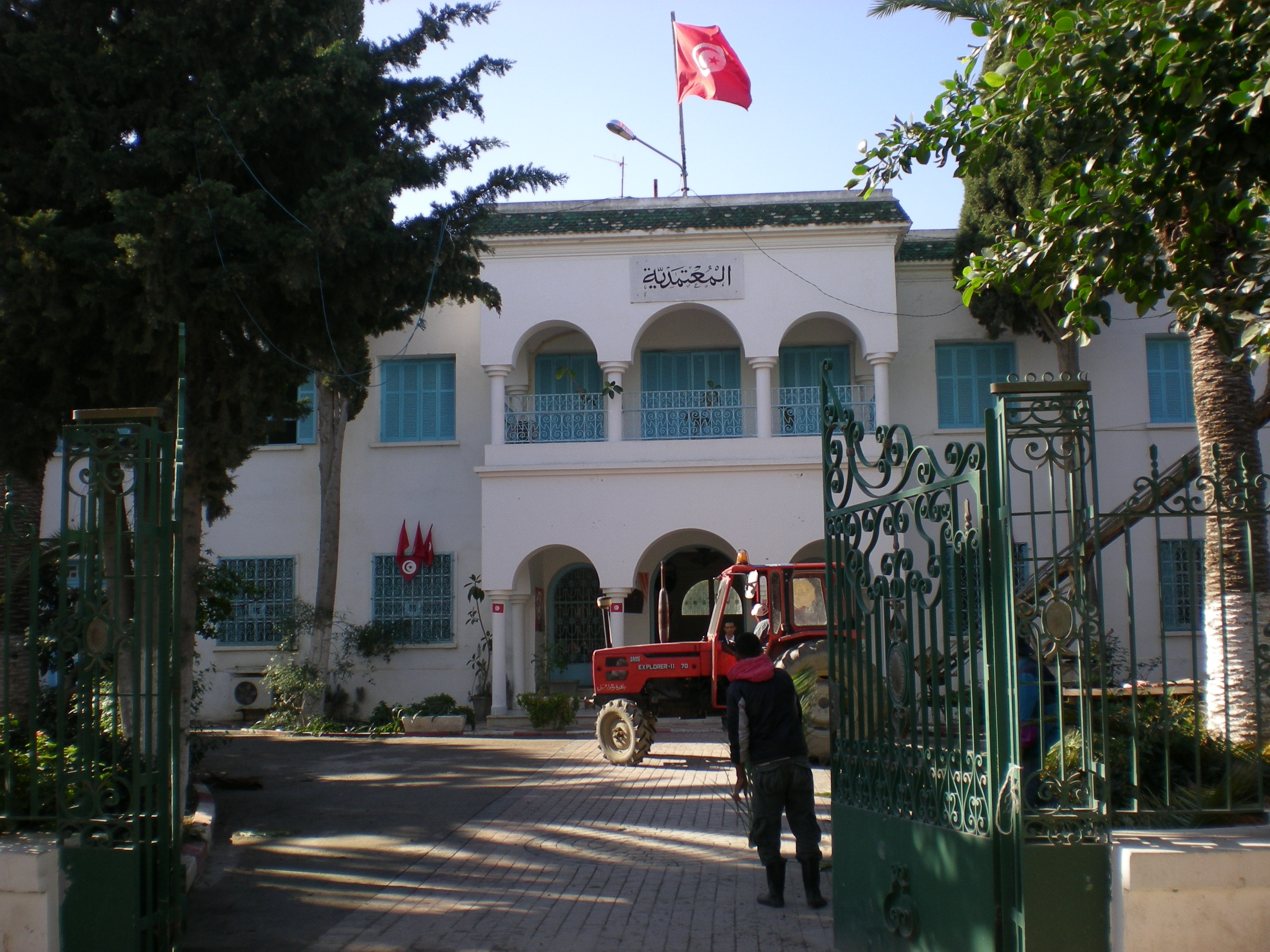
Siège de la délégation

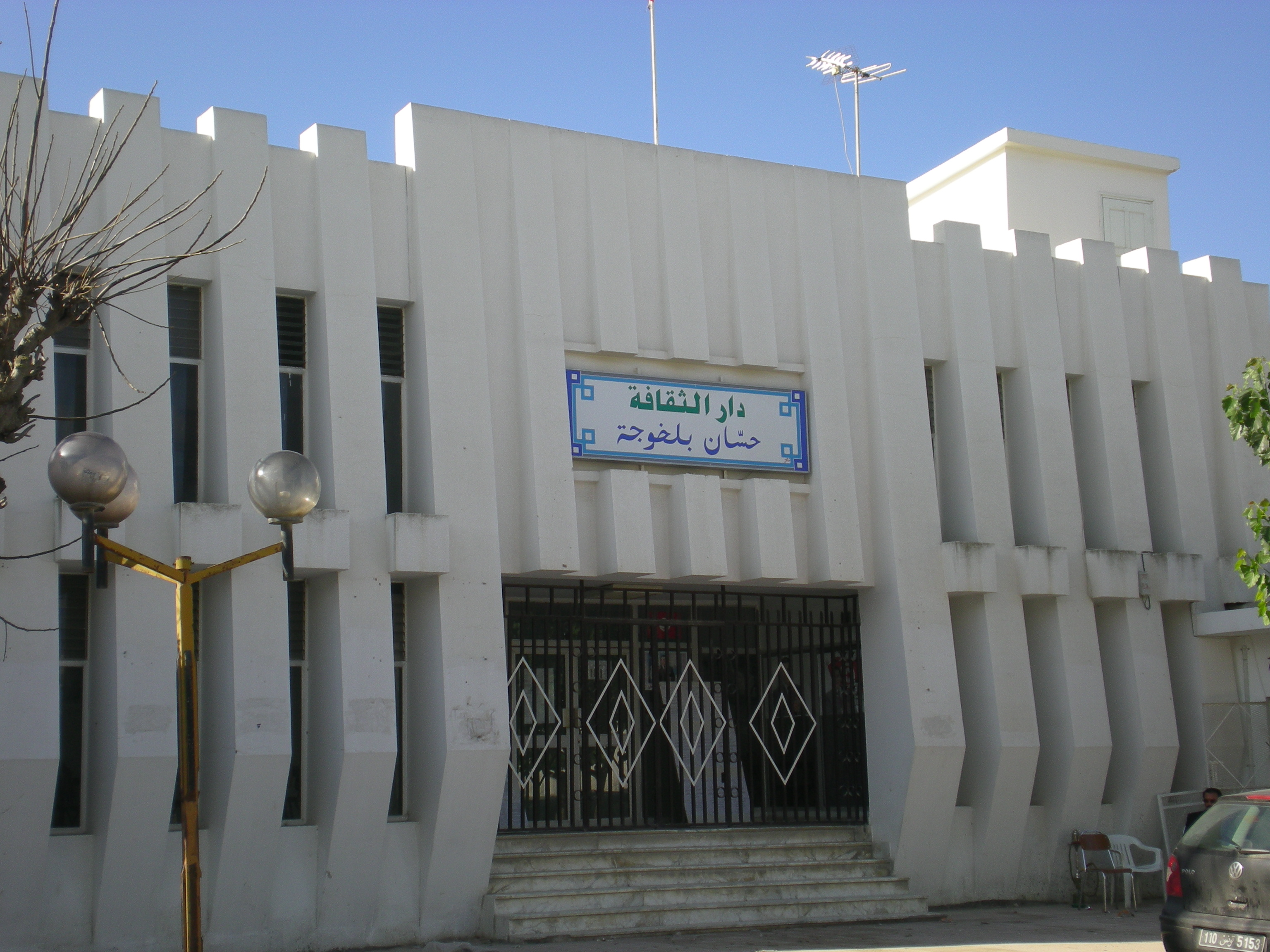
Maison de la culture Hassen-Belkhodja

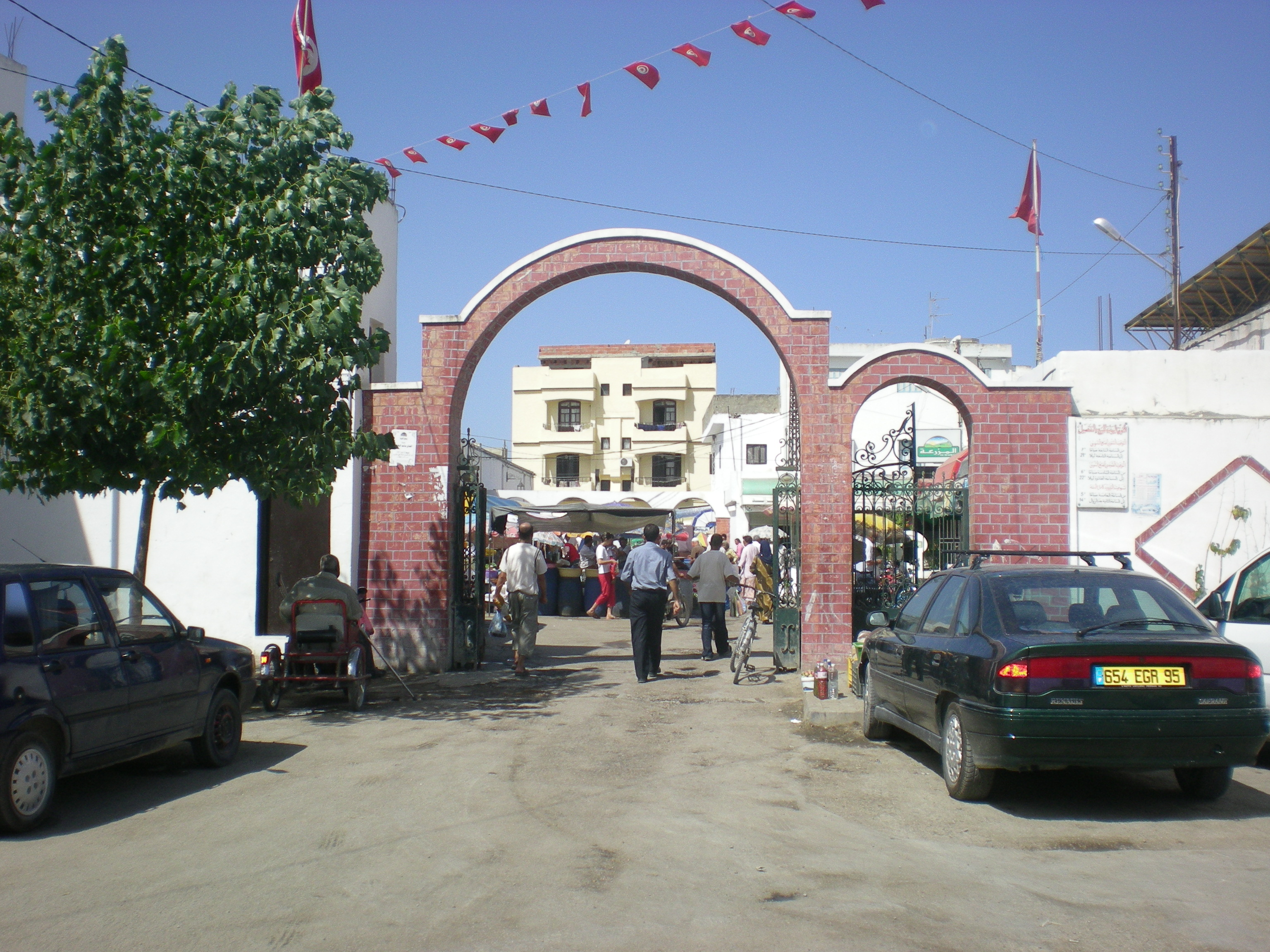
Entrée du marché

== See also ==
- List of cities in Tunisia
