= El Alia =

Coordinates: 37°10′N 10°02′E

El Alia العالية Uzalis
- Commune and town
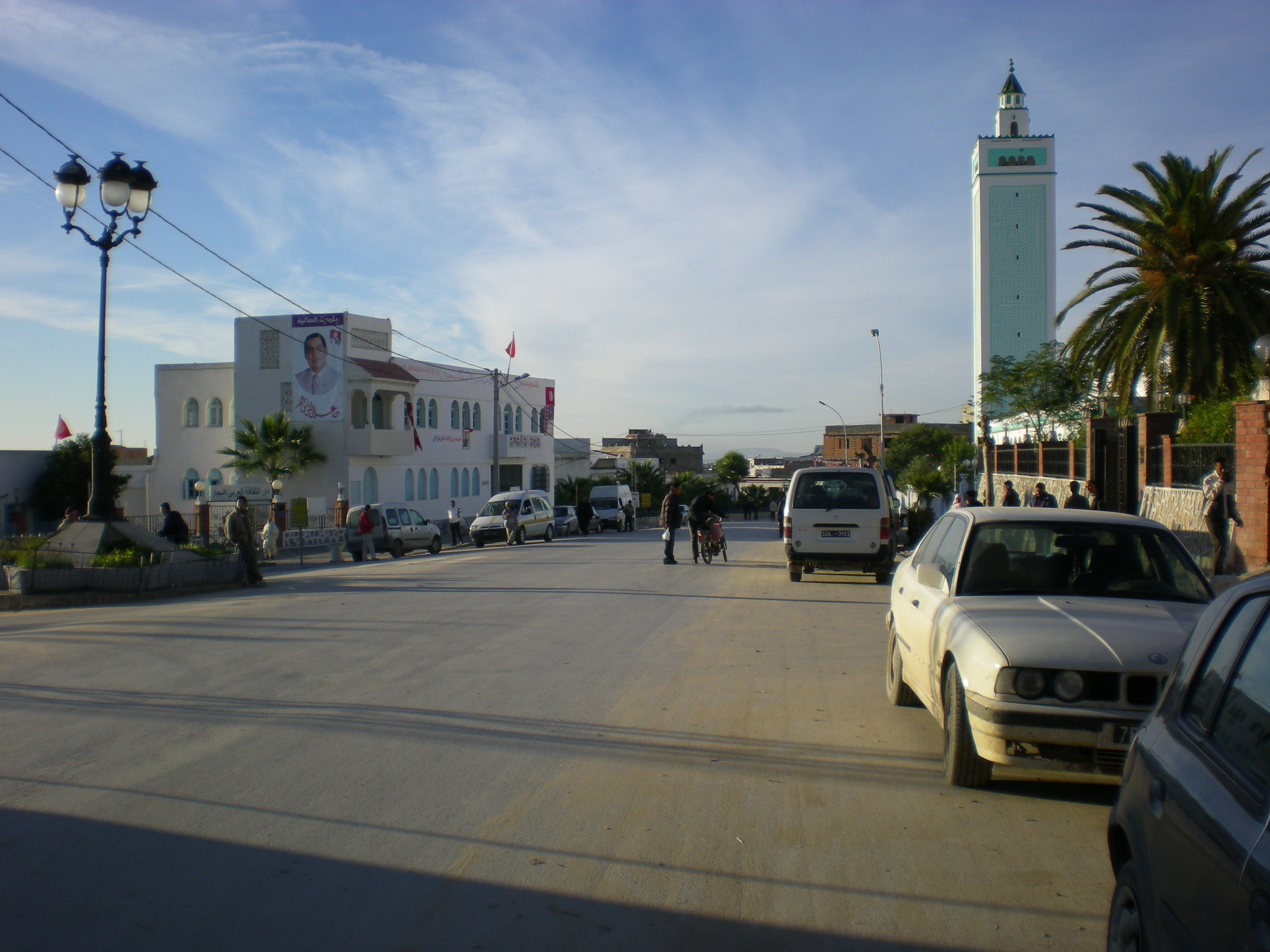
- Main Street, El Alia
- Interactive map of El Alia
- Country: Tunisia
- Governorate: Bizerte

Population (2014)
  - Total: 18,410
- Time zone: UTC+1 (CET)
- Postal code: 7016

El Alia is a town and commune in the Bizerte Governorate, Tunisia.

It was the ancient Uzalis in the Roman province of Africa Proconsularis, which became a Christian bishopric that is included in the Catholic Church's list of titular sees.

It is not to be confused with El Alia Cemetery, which is in Algeria.

== History ==
This city has existed since Roman times. In antiquity, its name was Uzalis while its current name comes from its founder in the Middle Ages: Ali El Balight. There are still some Roman ruins scattered throughout the city.

The population is largely composed of descendants of Andalusians who fled Spain after the Christian reconquest. Andalusian architecture has left its mark on the ancient city situated at the top of the hill (Djebel H'kima). The new city developed in the plains surrounding the ancient city. Monuments such as the Great Mosque and some mausoleums survived the modernization of the city, the walls and gates surrounding the old city having been destroyed at the beginning of the 20th century.

Nowadays, the city is made up of mostly farmers and labor workers. The city does not have a mayor.

== Population ==
2014 Census (Municipal)
Homes	Families	Males	Females	Total
5647	4476	9374	8985	18359

== See also ==
- List of cities in Tunisia
