= Bizerte Governorate =

Governorate of Tunisia

Bizerte Governorate ولاية بنزرت
- Governorate
- Map of Tunisia with Bizerte highlighted
- Coordinates: 37°16′N 9°52′E
- Country: Tunisia
- Created: 1956
- Capital: Bizerte

Government
  - Governor: Salem Ben Yacoub (since 2024)

Area
  - Total: 3,750 km^{2} (1,450 sq mi)
  - Rank: Ranked 13th of 24

Population (2024)
  - Total: 607,388
  - Rank: Ranked 7th of 24
  - Density: 162/km^{2} (420/sq mi)
- Time zone: UTC+01 (CET)
- Postal prefix: xx
- ISO 3166 code: TN-23

Bizerte Governorate (Arabic: ولاية بنزرت Wilāyat Benzart pronounced [bɑnˈzɑrt]; French: Gouvernorat de Bizerte) is the northernmost of the 24 governorates of Tunisia. It is in northern Tunisia, approximately rectangular and having a long north coast. It covers an area of 3,750 km^{2} including two large lakes, one coastal hence saline and one freshwater being the World Heritage Site, Ichkeul lake. It had a population of 607,388 (2024). The capital is Bizerte which stands principally on inlet between Bizerte lake and the Mediterranean. The offshore Galite Islands are part of the governorate, as are the ruins of the ancient city of Utica.

== Geography ==
The governorate is centered 60 kilometres (37 mi) from the capital and borders the governorates of Ariana, Béja, and Manouba.

The average temperature is 22.75 °C and annual rainfall is 300-800 millimeters.

== Administrative divisions ==
Administratively, the governorate is divided into fourteen delegations (mutamadiyat), thirteen municipalities, seven rural councils, and 102 sectors (imadas). The delegations and their populations from the 2004 and 2014 censuses, are listed below:

Delegations of Bizerte Governorate (Zarzouna is not shown)

Delegation	Area km^{2}	Population 2004	Population 2014
Bizerte Nord	53.52	75,234	87,307
Bizerte Sud	398.75	45,227	55,659
Djoumine	...	35,213	29,029
El Alia	...	24,539	27,075
Ghar El Melh	...	18,525	19,477
Ghezala	...	27,799	26,977
Mateur	...	47,562	46,975
Menzel Bourguiba	...	54,804	61,919
Menzel Jemil	...	39,691	47,224
Ras Jabel	...	51,240	58,241
Sejenane	...	42,156	40,166
Tinja	...	19,444	23,455
Utique	...	18,266	19,922
Zarzouna	7.12	24,428	24,793

The following thirteen municipalities are located in Bizerte Governorate:

1711	Bizerte	186,033
1712	Sejnane	21,974
1713	Mateur	49,316
1714	Menzel Bourguiba	60,356
1715	Tinja	21,995
1716	Ghar al Milh	10,630
1717	Aousja	11,637
1718	Menzel Jemil	32,918
1719	Menzel Abderrahmane	24,092
1720	El Alia	29,322
1721	Ras Jebel	36,645
1722	Metline	13,093
1723	Raf Raf	14,193
	El Hachachna	19,145
	Ghezala	25,366
	Joumine	27,896
	Utique	22,777

== Governors ==
A historical list of Governors of Bizerte Governorate since the independence in 1956:

- Mohsen Nouira (1956-1959)
- Mohamed Belamine (1959-1961)
- Naceur Ben Jaafar (1961-1964)
- Hédi Baccouche (1964-1967)
- Mongi Kooli (1967-31 -December 1969)
- Abdeljelil Mehiri (January-August 1970)
- Abdesselem Ghedira (1970-1971)
- Mezri Chekir (1971-1972)
- Slim Aloulou (1972-1975)
- Abdelmalek Laarif (1975-1980)
- Tahar Berrejeb (1980-1981)
- Rabah Dekhili (1981-1984)
- Salem Mansouri (1984-1987)
- Habib Sayhi (1987-1990)
- Mohamed Rahmani (1990-2 July 1991)
- Mohamed Ben Rejeb (2 July 1991-15 June 1993)
- Mohamed Soudani (15 June 1993-1995)
- Mohamed Ridha Mokrani (1995-1998)
- Sadok Marzouk (1998-2000)
- Mohamed Habib Brahem (2000-2004)
- Mehdi Chabbah (2004-2005)
- Salem Jribi (2005-2011)
- Chokri Belhassen (2 February 2011)
- Mohamed Hechmi Blouza (4 February 2011)
- Mohamed Hefdhi Mrabet (15 February 2011-22 February 2012)
- Nabil Nsiri (22 February-27 August 2012)
- Abderrazak Ben Khelifa (27 August 2012-24 August 2013)
- Ridha Lahouel (24 August 2013-14 February 2015)
- Mnaouer Ouertani (14 February 2015-16 September 2016)
- Mohamed Gouider (16 September 2016-12 August 2021)
- Samir Abdellaoui (12 August 2021-8 September 2024)
- Salem Ben Yacoub (since 8 September 2024)
