= Railway stations in Tunisia =

Railway stations in Tunisia include: (stations grouped by lines)

== Maps ==
- UNHCR Atlas Map

== Stations served ==
=== Existing ===
(standard gauge 1435 mm - to the north)

(narrow gauge 1000 mm - to the south)

- Gare Habib Bourguiba Monastir

=== Proposed ===
- Gabès - Tunisia railhead 1000 mm gauge
- (Tunisia) (Libya) (border)
- Ras Ajdir - Libya railhead 1435 mm gauge

==== Proposed Electrification ====
- 25 kV AC
- ( 0 km) Tunis
- (23 km) Borj Cédria
- Riadh

== See also ==
- Rail transport in Tunisia
- Transport in Tunisia
- Railway stations in Libya
