= Geography of Tunisia =

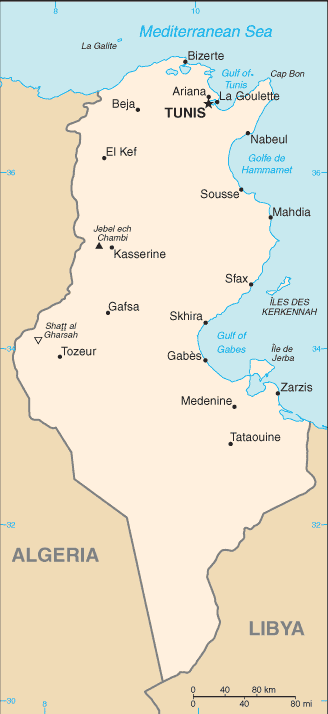
- Continent: Africa
- Region: Northern Africa
- Coordinates: 34°00′N 9°00′E
- Area: Ranked 93rd
  - Total: 163,610 km^{2} (63,170 sq mi)
  - Land: 95%
  - Water: 5%
- Coastline: 1,148 km (713 mi)
- Borders: Total land borders: 1,424 km Algeria 965 km, Libya 459 km
- Highest point: Jebel ech Chambi; 1,544 m
- Lowest point: Chott el Djerid -17 m
- Longest river: Medjerda River; 450 km

Tunisia map of Köppen climate classification.

Tunisia is a country in Northern Africa, bordering the Mediterranean Sea, having a western border with Algeria (965 km) and south-eastern border with Libya (459 km) where the width of land tapers to the south-west into the Sahara. The country has north, east and complex east-to-north coasts including the curved Gulf of Gabès, which forms the western part of Africa's Gulf of Sidra. Most of this greater gulf forms the main coast of Libya including the city of Sirte which shares its root name. The country's geographic coordinates are 34°00′N 9°00′E. Tunisia occupies an area of 163,610 square kilometres, of which 8,250 are water. The principal and reliable rivers rise in the north of the country with a few notable exceptions from north-east Algeria and flow through the northern plain where sufficient rainfall supports diverse plant cover and irrigated agriculture.

== Maritime claims ==
- Contiguous zone: 24 nmi (44.4 km; 27.6 mi)
- Territorial sea: 19 nmi (35.2 km; 21.9 mi)

== Physical geography ==
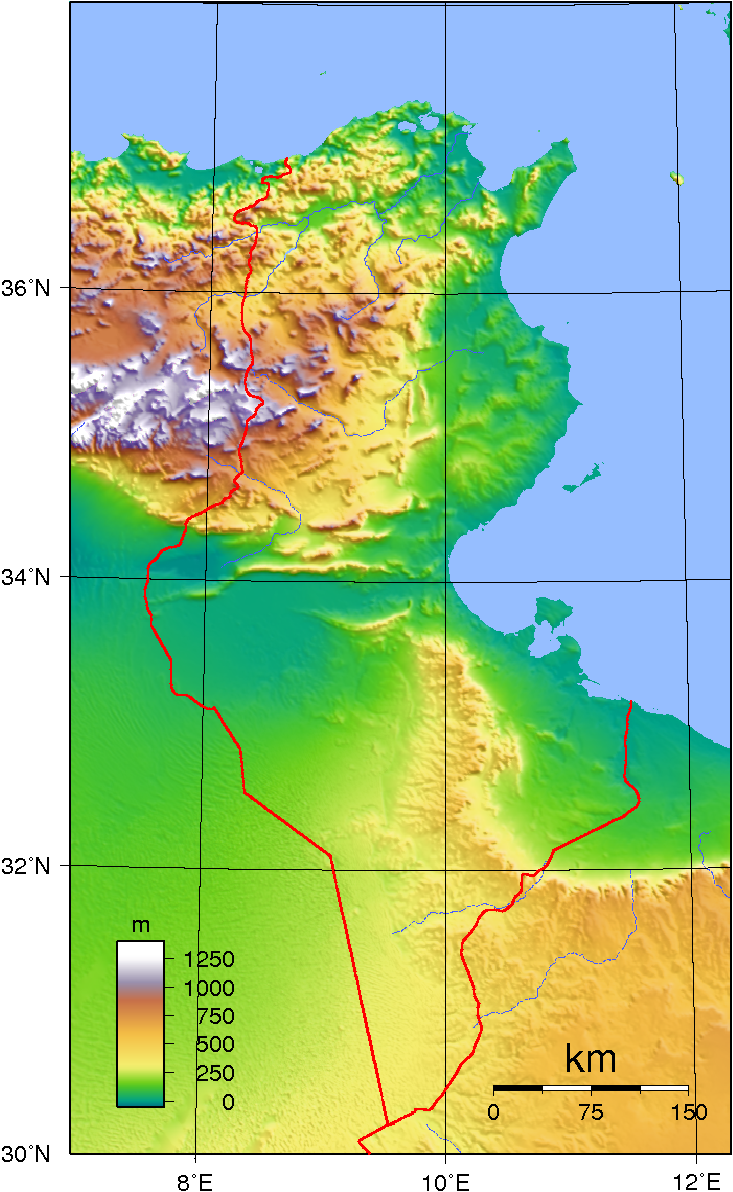
Topographic map of Tunisia.

Tunisia is on the Mediterranean coast of North Africa, midway between the Atlantic Ocean and the Nile Delta. It is bordered by Algeria on the west and Libya on the south east. It lies between latitudes 30° and 38°N, and longitudes 7° and 12°E. An abrupt southward turn of the Mediterranean coast in northern Tunisia gives the country two distinctive Mediterranean coasts, west–east in the north, and north–south in the east

Despite its relatively small size, Tunisia has great environmental diversity due to its north–south extent. Its east–west extent is limited. Differences in Tunisia, like the rest of the Maghreb, are largely north–south environmental differences defined by sharply decreasing rainfall southward from any point.

The Dorsal, the eastern extension of the Saharan Atlas Mountains, runs across Tunisia in a northeasterly direction from the Algerian border in the west to the Cape Bon peninsula in the east. North of the Dorsal is the Tell, a region characterized by low, rolling hills and plains, again an extension of mountains to the west in Algeria. In the Khroumerie, the northwestern corner of the Tunisian Tell, elevations reach 1,050 meters (3,440 feet) and snow occurs in winter. The Sahel, a broadening coastal plain along Tunisia's eastern Mediterranean coast, is among the world's premier areas of olive cultivation. Inland from the Sahel, between the Dorsal and a range of hills south of Gafsa, are the steppes. Much of the southern region is desert. Tunisia has a coastline 1,148 kilometres (713 miles) long. In maritime terms, the country claims a contiguous zone of 24 nautical miles (44 kilometres; 28 miles), and a territorial sea of 12 nautical miles (22 kilometres; 14 miles).

=== Rivers ===
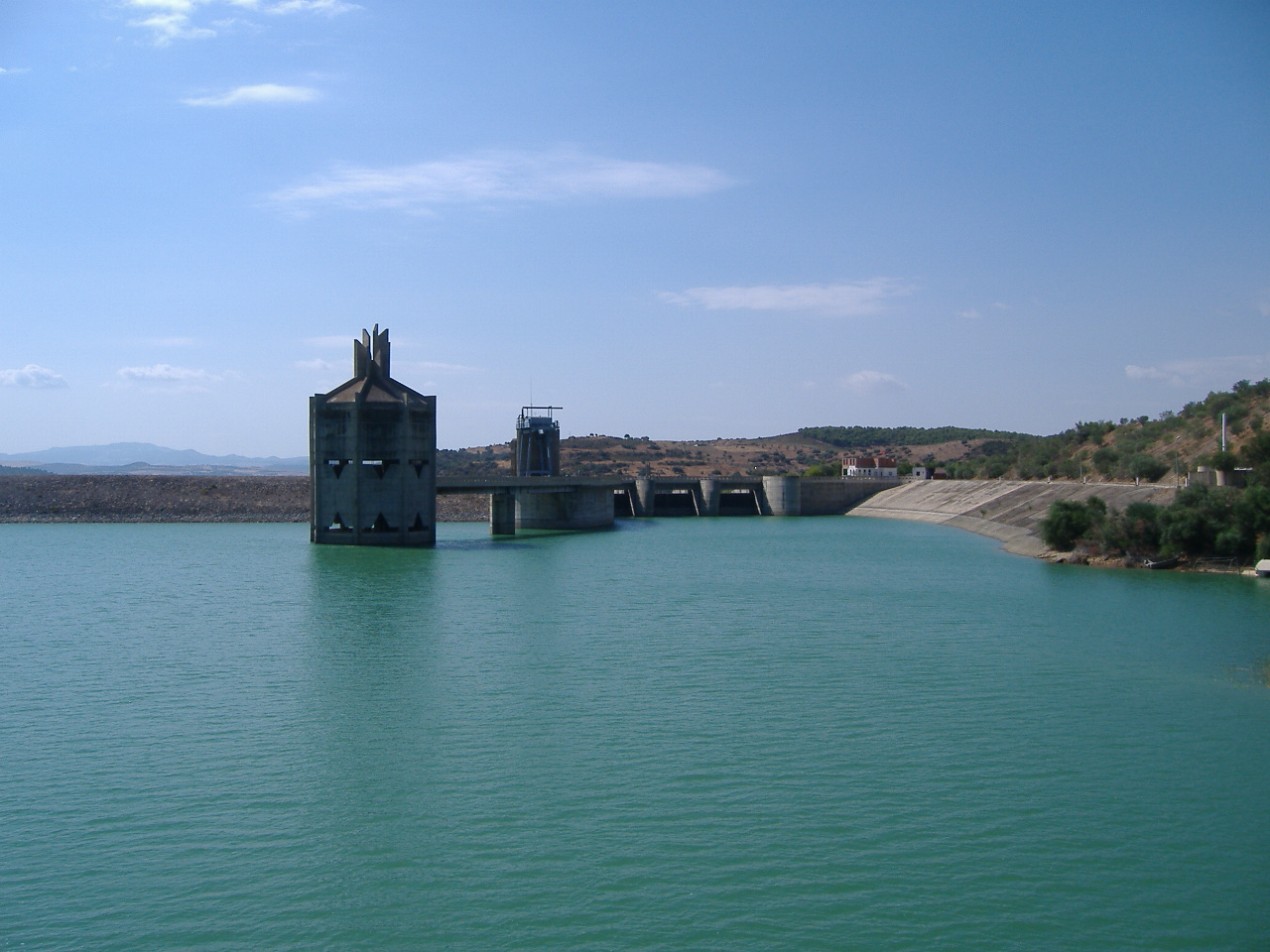
the Sidi Salem Dam is on the Medjerda River.

The Medjerda River rises in Algeria and flows east through the third of the country with reliable rivers, the north. It empties into the Gulf of Tunis and Lake of Tunis. At 450 km (280 mi) it is the longest river. It is also known as the wādi (or oued) Majardah and Wadi Mejerha and it was known as Bagrada in ancient times. It rises in a further section of the Tell Atlas in Algeria, staying to the south of the Tell escarpment while within the country. It has been dammed at the Sidi Salem Dam. The Oued Zouara rises in the country's own section of the Tell. It has been dammed by the Sidi el Barrak Dam which forms a large lake widely used across the north and centre of the country in an advanced water management project.

=== Climate ===
Tunisia is the eighteenth most water stressed country in the world.

Tunisia's climate is hot-summer Mediterranean climate (Köppen climate classification Csa) in the north, where winters are mild with moderate rainfall and summers are hot and dry. Temperatures in July and August can exceed 40 °C (104 °F) when the tropical continental air mass of the desert reaches the whole Tunisia. Winters are mild with temperatures rarely exceeding 20 °C (68 °F) (exception is the south-west of the country). The south of the country is desert. The terrain in the north is mountainous, which, moving south, gives way to a hot, dry central plain. As we go to the south, the climate naturally becomes hotter, drier and sunnier. The southern part has therefore a hot desert climate (Köppen climate classification BWh) with extremely hot summers, warm winters and very low annual rainfall amount. Daytime temperatures consistently turn around 45 °C (113 °F) during summers. However, the warmth of winters is only during daytime because nights can be cold in the desert. A series of salt lakes, known as chottzz or shatts, lie in an east–west line at the northern edge of the Sahara Desert, extending from the Gulf of Gabes into Algeria. The lowest point is Chott el Djerid, at −17 m (−55.8 ft), and the highest is Jebel ech Chambi, at 1,544 metres (5,066 ft). Annual average rainfall amount is lower than 500 mm (20 in) nearly everywhere in Tunisia. Tunisia is therefore a dry, semi-arid country. Areas with a pre-Saharan climate receive below 250 mm (9.8 in) and areas with a typical Saharan climate receive below 100 mm (3.9 in) of annual average precipitation. The southernmost part receives rainfall as low as 50 mm (2.0 in) in areas around El Borma, along the Algerian border.

==== Examples ====
Climate data for Tunis (Tunis–Carthage International Airport) 1981–2010, extremes 1943–present
Month	Jan	Feb	Mar	Apr	May	Jun	Jul	Aug	Sep	Oct	Nov	Dec	Year
Record high °C (°F)	25.1 (77.2)	28.5 (83.3)	36.5 (97.7)	33.1 (91.6)	41.4 (106.5)	47.0 (116.6)	47.4 (117.3)	48.9 (120.0)	44.4 (111.9)	40.0 (104.0)	30.5 (86.9)	29.6 (85.3)	48.9 (120.0)
Mean daily maximum °C (°F)	16.1 (61.0)	16.8 (62.2)	19.0 (66.2)	21.7 (71.1)	26.1 (79.0)	30.6 (87.1)	33.8 (92.8)	34.1 (93.4)	30.4 (86.7)	26.5 (79.7)	21.2 (70.2)	17.3 (63.1)	24.5 (76.0)
Daily mean °C (°F)	11.6 (52.9)	11.9 (53.4)	13.8 (56.8)	16.2 (61.2)	20.2 (68.4)	24.3 (75.7)	27.2 (81.0)	27.7 (81.9)	24.7 (76.5)	21.1 (70.0)	16.3 (61.3)	12.8 (55.0)	19.0 (66.2)
Mean daily minimum °C (°F)	7.6 (45.7)	7.7 (45.9)	9.2 (48.6)	11.4 (52.5)	14.8 (58.6)	18.6 (65.5)	21.3 (70.3)	22.2 (72.0)	20.1 (68.2)	16.8 (62.2)	12.2 (54.0)	8.9 (48.0)	14.2 (57.6)
Record low °C (°F)	−2.0 (28.4)	−1.1 (30.0)	1.0 (33.8)	1.7 (35.1)	6.0 (42.8)	10.0 (50.0)	13.0 (55.4)	11.7 (53.1)	12.0 (53.6)	6.0 (42.8)	0.8 (33.4)	0.0 (32.0)	−2.0 (28.4)
Average precipitation mm (inches)	63.1 (2.48)	49.2 (1.94)	39.2 (1.54)	38.5 (1.52)	23.6 (0.93)	12.9 (0.51)	4.0 (0.16)	7.1 (0.28)	56.3 (2.22)	47.7 (1.88)	54.8 (2.16)	75.2 (2.96)	471.6 (18.58)
Average precipitation days (≥ 1.0 mm)	8.6	8.1	8.0	5.5	3.1	1.7	0.6	1.3	3.5	6.1	5.9	8.1	60.5
Average relative humidity (%)	76	74	73	71	68	64	62	64	68	72	74	77	70
Mean monthly sunshine hours	145.7	159.6	198.4	225.0	282.1	309.0	356.5	328.6	258.0	217.0	174.0	148.8	2,802.7
Mean daily sunshine hours	4.7	5.7	6.4	7.5	9.1	10.3	11.5	10.6	8.6	7.0	5.8	4.8	7.7
Source 1: Institut National de la Météorologie (precipitation days/humidity/sun 1961–1990) (Note: The Station ID for Tunis Carthage is 11515111.)
Source 2: NOAA (precipitation days/humidity/sun 1961–1990), Meteo Climat (record highs and lows)

Climate data for Bizerte (1981–2010, extremes 1901–2021)
Month	Jan	Feb	Mar	Apr	May	Jun	Jul	Aug	Sep	Oct	Nov	Dec	Year
Record high °C (°F)	27.0 (80.6)	27.2 (81.0)	33.5 (92.3)	34.2 (93.6)	40.4 (104.7)	46.0 (114.8)	46.6 (115.9)	48.9 (120.0)	45.0 (113.0)	40.5 (104.9)	34.0 (93.2)	27.2 (81.0)	48.9 (120.0)
Mean daily maximum °C (°F)	15.6 (60.1)	16.0 (60.8)	18.0 (64.4)	20.4 (68.7)	25.0 (77.0)	29.1 (84.4)	32.3 (90.1)	32.8 (91.0)	29.6 (85.3)	25.8 (78.4)	20.5 (68.9)	16.8 (62.2)	23.5 (74.3)
Daily mean °C (°F)	11.2 (52.2)	11.3 (52.3)	12.8 (55.0)	15.1 (59.2)	19.0 (66.2)	23.1 (73.6)	26.0 (78.8)	26.6 (79.9)	23.9 (75.0)	20.4 (68.7)	15.7 (60.3)	12.5 (54.5)	18.1 (64.6)
Mean daily minimum °C (°F)	7.0 (44.6)	6.9 (44.4)	8.1 (46.6)	10.1 (50.2)	13.5 (56.3)	17.2 (63.0)	20.1 (68.2)	21.0 (69.8)	19.0 (66.2)	15.8 (60.4)	11.4 (52.5)	8.4 (47.1)	13.2 (55.8)
Record low °C (°F)	−4.2 (24.4)	−1.4 (29.5)	−0.4 (31.3)	1.0 (33.8)	3.1 (37.6)	8.0 (46.4)	8.0 (46.4)	10.0 (50.0)	8.9 (48.0)	4.9 (40.8)	0.0 (32.0)	−0.5 (31.1)	−4.2 (24.4)
Average precipitation mm (inches)	88.8 (3.50)	73.9 (2.91)	57.6 (2.27)	50.6 (1.99)	23.2 (0.91)	10.6 (0.42)	2.2 (0.09)	6.8 (0.27)	44.3 (1.74)	61.3 (2.41)	93.4 (3.68)	115.2 (4.54)	627.9 (24.73)
Average precipitation days (≥ 1.0 mm)	11.3	10.3	9.6	6.5	3.9	1.6	0.6	1.1	4.0	7.8	9.5	11.4	77.6
Average relative humidity (%)	83	80	78	78	75	70	68	69	75	78	83	83	77
Mean monthly sunshine hours	142.6	163.9	217.0	237.0	303.8	330.0	384.4	356.5	267.0	207.7	153.0	133.3	2,896.2
Mean daily sunshine hours	4.6	5.8	7.0	7.9	9.8	11.0	12.4	11.5	8.9	6.7	5.1	4.3	7.9
Source 1: Institut National de la Météorologie (precipitation days 1961–1990 and extremes 1950–2021) (Note: The Station ID for Bizerte is 11414111.)
Source 2: Deutscher Wetterdienst (extremes 1901–1992) OGIMET Arab Meteorology Book (humidity and sun)

Climate data for Sousse
Month	Jan	Feb	Mar	Apr	May	Jun	Jul	Aug	Sep	Oct	Nov	Dec	Year
Record high °C (°F)	27 (81)	30 (86)	37 (99)	36 (97)	43 (109)	47 (117)	47 (117)	48 (118)	42 (108)	40 (104)	31 (88)	30 (86)	48 (118)
Mean daily maximum °C (°F)	15.8 (60.4)	16.3 (61.3)	17.8 (64.0)	20.2 (68.4)	23.4 (74.1)	27.1 (80.8)	30.7 (87.3)	31.5 (88.7)	30.2 (86.4)	25.6 (78.1)	20.8 (69.4)	16.7 (62.1)	23.0 (73.4)
Daily mean °C (°F)	11.4 (52.5)	11.7 (53.1)	13.3 (55.9)	15.6 (60.1)	18.7 (65.7)	22.4 (72.3)	25.6 (78.1)	26.2 (79.2)	25.0 (77.0)	20.9 (69.6)	16.1 (61.0)	12.4 (54.3)	18.3 (64.9)
Mean daily minimum °C (°F)	7.2 (45.0)	7.4 (45.3)	8.9 (48.0)	11.0 (51.8)	14.1 (57.4)	17.8 (64.0)	20.6 (69.1)	20.9 (69.6)	19.9 (67.8)	16.3 (61.3)	11.5 (52.7)	8.1 (46.6)	13.6 (56.6)
Record low °C (°F)	4.8 (40.6)	5 (41)	5.5 (41.9)	5.5 (41.9)	9 (48)	13 (55)	14 (57)	16 (61)	15 (59)	7 (45)	5.5 (41.9)	4.5 (40.1)	4.5 (40.1)
Average rainfall mm (inches)	43 (1.7)	48 (1.9)	35 (1.4)	28 (1.1)	15 (0.6)	9 (0.4)	2 (0.1)	7 (0.3)	35 (1.4)	44 (1.7)	35 (1.4)	53 (2.1)	354 (14.1)
Average rainy days	7	6	7	6	5	2	1	2	4	6	6	7	59
Mean daily sunshine hours	6	7	7	8	10	11	12	11	9	7	7	6	8
Source 1: Climate-Data.org, Weather2Travel for rainy days and sunshine
Source 2: Voodoo Skies for record temperatures

Climate data for Sfax (1981–2010, extremes 1950–2017)
Month	Jan	Feb	Mar	Apr	May	Jun	Jul	Aug	Sep	Oct	Nov	Dec	Year
Record high °C (°F)	26.8 (80.2)	32.7 (90.9)	36.9 (98.4)	37.2 (99.0)	41.3 (106.3)	47.8 (118.0)	47.2 (117.0)	46.8 (116.2)	43.5 (110.3)	38.2 (100.8)	34.5 (94.1)	28.6 (83.5)	47.8 (118.0)
Mean daily maximum °C (°F)	17.1 (62.8)	18.1 (64.6)	20.2 (68.4)	22.5 (72.5)	26.0 (78.8)	29.9 (85.8)	32.7 (90.9)	33.2 (91.8)	30.5 (86.9)	27.1 (80.8)	22.3 (72.1)	18.2 (64.8)	24.8 (76.7)
Daily mean °C (°F)	11.5 (52.7)	12.3 (54.1)	14.6 (58.3)	17.2 (63.0)	20.9 (69.6)	24.6 (76.3)	27.3 (81.1)	28.0 (82.4)	25.6 (78.1)	22.1 (71.8)	16.8 (62.2)	12.7 (54.9)	19.5 (67.0)
Mean daily minimum °C (°F)	6.4 (43.5)	7.0 (44.6)	9.3 (48.7)	12.0 (53.6)	15.7 (60.3)	19.2 (66.6)	21.6 (70.9)	22.8 (73.0)	21.1 (70.0)	17.6 (63.7)	11.8 (53.2)	7.8 (46.0)	14.4 (57.8)
Record low °C (°F)	−2.3 (27.9)	−1.2 (29.8)	−1.0 (30.2)	2.0 (35.6)	6.1 (43.0)	10.6 (51.1)	13.6 (56.5)	13.2 (55.8)	11.2 (52.2)	5.2 (41.4)	2.0 (35.6)	−1.0 (30.2)	−2.3 (27.9)
Average rainfall mm (inches)	30.1 (1.19)	13.5 (0.53)	21.8 (0.86)	19.1 (0.75)	13.2 (0.52)	4.2 (0.17)	1.2 (0.05)	4.2 (0.17)	24.9 (0.98)	36.6 (1.44)	25.1 (0.99)	29.0 (1.14)	222.9 (8.79)
Average rainy days (≥ 1.0 mm)	3.4	3.3	3.7	2.8	1.7	0.6	0.2	0.5	2.5	3.6	2.8	2.9	28
Average relative humidity (%)	65	63	63	63	62	60	59	63	65	66	65	66	63
Mean monthly sunshine hours	198.4	201.6	238.7	258.0	310.0	333.0	378.2	347.2	273.0	241.8	210.0	195.3	3,185.2
Mean daily sunshine hours	6.4	7.2	7.7	8.6	10.0	11.1	12.2	11.2	9.1	7.8	7.0	6.3	8.7
Source 1: Institut National de la Météorologie (precipitation days/humidity/sun 1961–1990) (Note: The Station ID for Sfax is 45050111.)
Source 2: NOAA (humidity and sun 1961–1990)

Climate data for Gabès (1981–2010, extremes 1950–2021)
Month	Jan	Feb	Mar	Apr	May	Jun	Jul	Aug	Sep	Oct	Nov	Dec	Year
Record high °C (°F)	29.3 (84.7)	33.9 (93.0)	41.0 (105.8)	38.2 (100.8)	43.6 (110.5)	46.5 (115.7)	46.7 (116.1)	46.6 (115.9)	44.2 (111.6)	40.1 (104.2)	35.0 (95.0)	31.2 (88.2)	46.7 (116.1)
Mean daily maximum °C (°F)	16.9 (62.4)	18.4 (65.1)	20.2 (68.4)	22.5 (72.5)	25.4 (77.7)	28.3 (82.9)	31.3 (88.3)	32.2 (90.0)	30.3 (86.5)	27.3 (81.1)	22.5 (72.5)	18.1 (64.6)	24.5 (76.0)
Daily mean °C (°F)	12.1 (53.8)	13.3 (55.9)	15.6 (60.1)	18.2 (64.8)	21.6 (70.9)	24.9 (76.8)	27.6 (81.7)	28.5 (83.3)	26.6 (79.9)	23.1 (73.6)	17.7 (63.9)	13.4 (56.1)	20.2 (68.4)
Mean daily minimum °C (°F)	7.8 (46.0)	8.6 (47.5)	11.2 (52.2)	14.2 (57.6)	17.9 (64.2)	21.5 (70.7)	23.7 (74.7)	24.7 (76.5)	22.8 (73.0)	18.9 (66.0)	13.3 (55.9)	9.2 (48.6)	16.2 (61.1)
Record low °C (°F)	−2.7 (27.1)	−2.0 (28.4)	0.9 (33.6)	4.6 (40.3)	8.2 (46.8)	12.0 (53.6)	15.6 (60.1)	16.8 (62.2)	14.4 (57.9)	6.8 (44.2)	2.6 (36.7)	0.0 (32.0)	−2.7 (27.1)
Average precipitation mm (inches)	26.3 (1.04)	11.3 (0.44)	15.6 (0.61)	15.8 (0.62)	9.1 (0.36)	2.1 (0.08)	0.3 (0.01)	1.2 (0.05)	23.8 (0.94)	31.4 (1.24)	23.3 (0.92)	27.9 (1.10)	188.1 (7.41)
Average precipitation days (≥ 1.0 mm)	2.8	2.4	2.8	2.4	1.1	0.6	0.1	0.2	1.6	3.4	2.7	3.1	23.2
Average relative humidity (%)	62	59	62	63	65	66	63	65	66	64	62	64	63
Mean monthly sunshine hours	220.1	215.6	251.1	267.0	313.1	321.0	372.0	353.4	279.0	260.4	228.0	210.8	3,291.5
Mean daily sunshine hours	7.1	7.7	8.1	8.9	10.1	10.7	12.0	11.4	9.3	8.4	7.6	6.8	9.0
Source 1: Institut National de la Météorologie (precipitation days/humidity/sun 1961–1990) (Note: The Station ID for Gabès is 46565111.)
Source 2: NOAA (humidity and sun 1961–1990)

Climate data for Kasserine (1981–2010, extremes 1950–2017)
Month	Jan	Feb	Mar	Apr	May	Jun	Jul	Aug	Sep	Oct	Nov	Dec	Year
Record high °C (°F)	25.2 (77.4)	31.5 (88.7)	33.0 (91.4)	34.7 (94.5)	41.7 (107.1)	43.4 (110.1)	43.6 (110.5)	42.5 (108.5)	40.3 (104.5)	36.0 (96.8)	31.6 (88.9)	26.5 (79.7)	43.6 (110.5)
Mean daily maximum °C (°F)	13.7 (56.7)	15.1 (59.2)	18.4 (65.1)	21.5 (70.7)	26.8 (80.2)	32.1 (89.8)	35.9 (96.6)	35.1 (95.2)	29.7 (85.5)	25.1 (77.2)	18.7 (65.7)	14.7 (58.5)	23.9 (75.0)
Daily mean °C (°F)	7.9 (46.2)	8.9 (48.0)	12.4 (54.3)	15.6 (60.1)	20.1 (68.2)	24.7 (76.5)	28.0 (82.4)	27.3 (81.1)	22.6 (72.7)	18.7 (65.7)	12.5 (54.5)	8.9 (48.0)	17.3 (63.1)
Mean daily minimum °C (°F)	2.8 (37.0)	3.5 (38.3)	5.8 (42.4)	8.3 (46.9)	12.4 (54.3)	16.3 (61.3)	18.9 (66.0)	19.0 (66.2)	16.3 (61.3)	12.4 (54.3)	7.2 (45.0)	4.0 (39.2)	10.6 (51.0)
Record low °C (°F)	−7.0 (19.4)	−6.0 (21.2)	−3.0 (26.6)	0.0 (32.0)	3.2 (37.8)	8.0 (46.4)	10.5 (50.9)	12.0 (53.6)	5.8 (42.4)	0.5 (32.9)	−3.1 (26.4)	−6.5 (20.3)	−7.0 (19.4)
Average precipitation mm (inches)	27.7 (1.09)	14.5 (0.57)	19.0 (0.75)	29.6 (1.17)	30.2 (1.19)	21.4 (0.84)	13.6 (0.54)	29.7 (1.17)	40.1 (1.58)	21.3 (0.84)	24.7 (0.97)	16.7 (0.66)	288.5 (11.37)
Average precipitation days (≥ 1.0 mm)	2.9	2.2	3.9	4.3	4.5	3.1	1.6	3.6	4.7	3.7	3.3	2.3	40.1
Source: Institut National de la Météorologie (precipitation days 1961–1990) (Note: The Station ID for Kasserine is 64646111.)

Climate data for Kebili (1901–1953)
Month	Jan	Feb	Mar	Apr	May	Jun	Jul	Aug	Sep	Oct	Nov	Dec	Year
Record high °C (°F)	26.1 (79.0)	33.9 (93.0)	38.9 (102.0)	43.9 (111.0)	46.1 (115.0)	53.9 (129.0)	55.0 (131.0)	53.9 (129.0)	51.1 (124.0)	45.0 (113.0)	37.2 (99.0)	27.8 (82.0)	55.0 (131.0)
Mean daily maximum °C (°F)	15.6 (60.1)	18.9 (66.0)	23.3 (73.9)	28.9 (84.0)	32.8 (91.0)	38.3 (100.9)	42.2 (108.0)	41.7 (107.1)	37.2 (99.0)	30.0 (86.0)	22.2 (72.0)	16.1 (61.0)	28.9 (84.0)
Daily mean °C (°F)	9.4 (48.9)	11.9 (53.4)	15.8 (60.4)	20.3 (68.5)	24.2 (75.6)	28.9 (84.0)	31.9 (89.4)	31.9 (89.4)	28.9 (84.0)	22.8 (73.0)	15.6 (60.1)	10.3 (50.5)	21.0 (69.8)
Mean daily minimum °C (°F)	3.3 (37.9)	5.0 (41.0)	8.3 (46.9)	11.7 (53.1)	15.6 (60.1)	19.4 (66.9)	21.7 (71.1)	22.2 (72.0)	20.6 (69.1)	15.6 (60.1)	8.9 (48.0)	4.4 (39.9)	13.1 (55.6)
Record low °C (°F)	−6.1 (21.0)	−6.1 (21.0)	−3.9 (25.0)	0.0 (32.0)	6.1 (43.0)	12.2 (54.0)	13.9 (57.0)	11.1 (52.0)	7.8 (46.0)	1.1 (34.0)	−5.0 (23.0)	−7.2 (19.0)	−7.2 (19.0)
Average precipitation mm (inches)	13 (0.5)	8 (0.3)	15 (0.6)	8 (0.3)	5 (0.2)	0 (0)	0 (0)	0 (0)	5 (0.2)	8 (0.3)	15 (0.6)	10 (0.4)	86 (3.4)
Average precipitation days (≥ 0.1 mm)	4	3	4	2	2	1	0	1	2	3	4	3	29
Source: Deutscher Wetterdienst

=== Natural resources ===
Tunisia possesses petroleum, phosphates, iron ore, lead, zinc, salt, gold and arable land. 3,850 km^{2} of land is irrigated in Tunisia. The use of land in the country is demonstrated in the following table.

Land use
Use	Percentage of Area (2011)
arable land	17.35%
permanent crops	14.63%
other	68.02%

== Environment ==
Current environmental issues for Tunisia include:

- Toxic and hazardous waste - disposal is ineffective and presents human health risks
- Water pollution from raw sewage
- Limited natural fresh water resources
- Deforestation
- Overgrazing
- Soil erosion
- Desertification

Tunisia is a party to the following international agreements: Biodiversity, Climate Change, Climate Change-Kyoto Protocol, Desertification, Endangered Species, Environmental Modification, Hazardous Wastes, Law of the Sea, Marine Dumping, Ozone Layer Protection, Ship Pollution (MARPOL 73/78) and Wetlands. Tunisia has signed, but not ratified the Marine Life Conservation agreement.

Tunisia, like other North African countries, has lost much of its prehistoric biodiversity due to the ongoing expanding human population; for example, until historic times there was a population of the endangered primate Barbary macaque (Macaca sylvanus). The monk seal is now extirpated (locally extinct).

=== Tree cover extent and loss ===
Global Forest Watch publishes annual estimates of tree cover loss and 2000 tree cover extent derived from time-series analysis of Landsat satellite imagery in the Global Forest Change dataset. In this framework, tree cover refers to vegetation taller than 5 m (including natural forests and tree plantations), and tree cover loss is defined as the complete removal of tree cover canopy for a given year, regardless of cause.

For Tunisia, country statistics report cumulative tree cover loss of 38,152 ha (381.52 km^{2}) from 2001 to 2024 (about 17.0% of its 2000 tree cover area). For tree cover density greater than 30%, country statistics report a 2000 tree cover extent of 223,929 ha (2,239.29 km^{2}). The charts and table below display this data. In simple terms, the annual loss number is the area where tree cover disappeared in that year, and the extent number shows what remains of the 2000 tree cover baseline after subtracting cumulative loss. Forest regrowth is not included in the dataset.

Annual tree cover loss in Tunisia, 2001–2024. View chart definition.
Tree cover extent in 2000 minus cumulative tree cover loss in Tunisia, 2001–2024 (loss-only residual; does not account for gain). View chart definition.

Annual tree cover extent and loss
Year	Tree cover extent (km2) (Note: This residual measure does not include forest regrowth.)	Annual tree cover loss (km2)
2001	2,236.97	2.32
2002	2,234.52	2.45
2003	2,219.13	15.39
2004	2,215.93	3.20
2005	2,209.61	6.32
2006	2,206.08	3.53
2007	2,197.29	8.79
2008	2,190.11	7.18
2009	2,180.30	9.81
2010	2,176.31	3.99
2011	2,154.26	22.05
2012	2,140.08	14.18
2013	2,127.07	13.01
2014	2,103.21	23.86
2015	2,084.41	18.80
2016	2,069.86	14.55
2017	1,984.53	85.33
2018	1,975.47	9.06
2019	1,969.75	5.72
2020	1,959.13	10.62
2021	1,938.34	20.79
2022	1,908.90	29.44
2023	1,874.43	34.47
2024	1,857.77	16.66

== Extreme points ==
This is a list of the extreme points of Tunisia, the points that are farther north, south, east or west than any other

- Northernmost point - Gallo, Iles des Chiens, Galite Islands, Bizerte Governorate
- Northernmost point (mainland) – Ras ben Sakka (Ra's al Abyad), Bizerte Governorate*
- Easternmost point – Bel Ahemer on the border with Libya, Medenine Governorate
- Southernmost point – the tripoint with Algeria and Libya, Tataouine Governorate
- Westernmost point - Village of Hizwa on the border with Algeria due west of Nefta, Tozeur Governorate
- *Note: this is also the northernmost point of the African continent

== See also ==
- List of cities in Tunisia
