= Major projects in Tunisia =

The Major Projects in Tunisia refer to large-scale initiatives either currently under development or planned within the Republic of Tunisia.

Tunisia, with its strategic geographic position and diversified economy, has attracted significant foreign investments for decades. These investments span various sectors, notably infrastructure, transportation, real estate, tourism, banking, energy, healthcare, sports, higher education, and culture.

Overview of Major Projects

This document provides an organized overview of the most important ongoing or planned projects across Tunisia.

=== Infrastructure Projects ===
Mainly related to highways, bridges, and commercial ports:

Project	Origin	Status	Expected Completion	Cost (Million Dinar)	Region	Description
Maghreb highway	Tunisia	In Progress	2034	4227	Entire Tunisia	Divided into four main sections: A1 Highway (Tunis–Sfax–Gabès): 154 km from Sfax to Gabès, costing ~817 million Dinar, funded equally by Tunisia and the European Investment Bank, opened May 24, 2018.; Gabès–Mednine–Ras Jedir: 176 km, cost ~1 billion Dinar, financed by the Tunisian state and JICA for Gabès–Mednine, and by the African Development Bank for Mednine–Ras Jedir.; Gabès–Mednine segment: 84 km, opened in 2023.; Mednine–Ben Gardane: 57 km, opened July 27, 2018.; Ben Gardane–Ras Jedir: 35 km, opened March 7, 2021.
Highway A3 (Tunis–Kef)	Tunisia	In Progress	2034	1660	Tunis, Kairouan, Sidi Bouzid, Gafsa, El Kef	Part of Tunisia’s 2016-2020 development plan aimed at boosting economic activity by connecting interior regions via a 385 km highway, initially reaching Zaghouan, then Kairouan, Sidi Bouzid, and Gafsa. Funded partly by the European Union; initial phase (Gafsa–Jalel) received 481 million Dinar from European sources.
Kasserine Algeria Border Highway	Tunisia	Under Study	2034	710	Kasserine	Estimated 115 km, cost approx. 710 million Dinar. To connect Kasserine to the Algerian border, with potential routes including tunnels or bridges; detailed planning ongoing.
Tataouine–Highway A1	Tunisia	In Progress	2019–Present	120	Tataouine	Connecting Tataouine to Highway A1, with construction begun in May 2019.
Ring Road (X20)	Tunisia	In Progress	2020–Present	163	Grand Tunis	Completing ring road around Tunis to ease traffic congestion.
Bizerte Fixed Bridge	Tunisia and EU	In Progress	June 2026	610	Bizerte	A 2 km long bridge at 69 meters above sea level, costing 610 million Dinar, to enhance regional development. Construction awarded to Sichuan Road and Bridge Group, start April 2024.
Djerba–Ajim Bridge	Tunisia and China	Under Study	2023–Present	900	Djerba	Connecting Ajim to Djerba island, supporting tourism and local ecology. Project aims to sustain the environment of Bougrara Lake.
Radès–La Goulette bridge	Tunisia and Japan	Completed	2009	Unknown	Radès, La Goulette	A bridge over Lake Tunis, approximately 20 meters above water, built by a Japanese company with Egyptian consortium funding.
Enfidha Deep Water Port	Tunisia	Under Study	Unknown	2,500	Enfidha	A large commercial port under development, land preparation began in 2015, with plans for over 50,000 jobs and significant regional economic impact.
Western Tunis Flood Protection	Tunisia and Japan	Completed	2017	131.2	Grand Tunis	Flood defense project in western Tunis, including riverbed management and floodplain infrastructure, supported by a Japanese loan.
Strait of Sicily Tunnel	Tunisia and Italy	Cancelled	Estimated 10 years	20 billion USD	Nabeul Sicily	A proposed 60 km tunnel under the Mediterranean connecting Sicily and Nabeul, Italy–Tunisia. Currently cancelled due to feasibility issues.

== Transportation Projects ==
Including airports and mass transit:

Project	Origin	Status	Expected Completion	Cost (Million Dinar)	Region	Description
High-Speed Rail Network	Tunisia	Partially Completed	2030	1100	Grand Tunis	Capable of transporting 600,000 passengers, replacing numerous buses and cars, reducing emissions. A train can carry as much as 50 buses or 1,700 cars. As of 2018, 41% complete.
Sfax Metro	Tunisia	Under Study	2028	2800	Sfax	Detailed studies completed, project aims to improve urban transport.
Enfidha–Hammamet International Airport	Turkey	Completed	2009	300	Enfidha	Modern airport 90 km south of Tunis, with a capacity of 5 million passengers/year, expandable to 20 million in future expansion.
Tunis–Utica International Airport	Tunisia	Under Study	2030	2250	Bizerte	A new international airport with global standards, designed to attract more travelers and reduce pressure on Tunis-Carthage airport.
Tabarka Airport Dismantling Facility	Tunisia	Under Study	Unknown	Unknown	Tabarka	Approved in 2017, expected to be operational soon, to support aircraft recycling and maintenance.

== Cultural, Tourism, and Sports Projects ==
Projects mainly focused on tourism resorts, cultural centers, and sports facilities:

Project	Origin	Status	Expected Completion	Cost (Million Dinar)	Region	Description
Tozeur Sahara Resort	Qatar	Completed	2019	160	Tozeur	A luxury five-star desert resort including suites, wellness center, conference halls, traditional tents, and cultural village. Features natural springs, oases, and salt lakes, emphasizing sustainability and local heritage.
City of Culture Tunis	Tunisia	Completed	2018	76.3	Tunis	Cultural complex comprising opera house, auditorium, theater, studios, media center, cinema, galleries, and a 60-meter tower with city views. Designed to promote arts and culture.
Bizerte Marina	Tunisia	Partially Completed	2018–Present	170	Bizerte	A marina with capacity for 1,000 yachts, luxury hotel, shops, and recreational facilities, supporting tourism and maritime activities.
Tunis Economic City	Tunisia	Cancelled	Unknown	5000	Tunis	A proposed massive economic, tourism, and social hub covering 90 km², including industrial zones, port, free trade area, medical city, university, residential and entertainment zones. Proposed with Saudi investment; rejected by government for being too ambitious amid other regional needs.
Tunis City Center	Tunisia	Cancelled	Unknown	Unknown	Tunis	A commercial and residential complex with shopping mall, cinemas, offices, apartments, and parking, planned over 4.27 hectares. Started in 2008 but later cancelled.

== Other Notable Projects ==
- Tunisia Financial Port: A $3 billion project to develop a financial center in Ariana Governorate, Raoued including business, banking, insurance, universities, hospital, marina, commercial zone, and residential units. Land preparation began in 2015; project revived after 2016 talks, but as of 2025 is suspended.
- Tunisia F1 Race Track: Proposed 5 km race circuit, with plans for housing, sports facilities, hotels, and commercial centers. Currently under study.
- El Khomssa Island: A futuristic island resort in Korbous, inspired by Dubai’s Palm Jumeirah, featuring skyscrapers, hotels, and entertainment, projected to host 20 million tourists annually. Still In negotiations.
