= List of bridges in Tunisia =

== Historical or architectural interest bridges ==
| | Name | Arabic | Distinction | Length | Type | Carries Crosses | Opened | Location | Governorate | Ref. |
|---|---|---|---|---|---|---|---|---|---|---|
| 1 | Tiberius Bridge (Béja) | | Protected monument ID 31-95 | | Masonry | Oued Béja | 1st century | Béja | Béja Governorate | |
| 2 | Zaghouan Aqueduct | شبكة قنوات مياه زغوان | | | Masonry | Zaghouan Aqueduct (total length : 132 km (82 mi)) | 2nd century | Mohamedia; 36°38′14.1″N 10°7′45.9″E | Ben Arous Governorate | |
| 3 | Chemtou Bridge | | Protected monument ID 32-30 | | Masonry; 3 arches | Medjerda River | 3rd century | Chemtou; 36°29′18.1″N 8°34′18.9″E | Jendouba Governorate | |
| 4 | Oued Miliane Bridge | | Protected monument ID 13-16 | | Masonry | Oued Miliane | | Radès; 36°45′19.7″N 10°16′45.3″E | Ben Arous Governorate | |
| 5 | Oued Guetoussia Aqueduct Bridge | | Protected monument ID 31-24 | | Masonry | Dougga Aqueduct; Oued Guetoussia | | Téboursouk - Dougga; 36°24′48.6″N 9°10′44.4″E | Béja Governorate | |
| 6 | Sbeïtla Aqueduct Bridge | قناة مياه سبيطلة المرفوعة | Protected monument ID 42-39 | 51 m (167 ft) | Masonry | Sbeïtla Aqueduct; Oued Sbeïtla | | Sbeitla; 35°14′43″N 9°7′3.5″E | Kasserine Governorate | |
| 7 | Thuburnica Bridge | | Protected monument ID 32-23 | | Masonry | Oued el Enja | | Thuburnica; 36°31′32.0″N 8°28′08.3″E | Jendouba Governorate | |
| 8 | Bizerte Old Bridge | | Protected monument ID 12-4 | | Masonry | Medjerda River | | Protville; 36°59′40.2″N 10°03′40.6″E | Ariana Governorate | |
| 9 | Medjez El Bab Bridge | القنطرة المرادية | Protected monument ID 31-109 | | Masonry | Medjerda River | 1677 | Majaz al Bab; 36°38′56.0″N 9°36′22.3″E | Béja Governorate | |
| 10 | Bizerta Transporter Bridge dismantled in 1909 | الجسر الناقل ببنزرت | Conception by Ferdinand Arnodin; Span : 109 m (358 ft) | 109 m (358 ft) | Suspension; Steel; Transporter bridge | Bizerte Canal | 1898 | Bizerte | Bizerte Governorate | (Note: Dismantled and rebuilt in Brest.) |
| 11 | Fifth Bridge of Béja | جسر الخمسة | | 350 m (1,150 ft) | Masonry | Oued Béja | 1915 | Béja; 36°45′39″N 9°11′42″E | Béja Governorate | |
| 12 | Bizerte Bascule Bridge | الجسر المتحرك ببنزرت | | 376 m (1,234 ft) | Truss; Acier; Scherzer type bascule bridge | P8; Bizerte Canal | 1980 | Bizerte; 37°16′4.8″N 9°52′32.2″E | Bizerte Governorate | |

== Major bridges ==
| | Name | Arabic | Span | Length | Type | Carries Crosses | Opened | Location | Governorate | Ref. |
|---|---|---|---|---|---|---|---|---|---|---|
| 1 | Radès–La Goulette bridge | جسر رادس–حلق الوادي | 120 m (390 ft) | 260 m (850 ft) | Extradosed; Concrete box girder deck and concrete pylons 70+120+70 | Lake of Tunis | 2009 | Radès - La Goulette; 36°48′27.7″N 10°15′36.3″E | Ben Arous Governorate - Tunis Governorate | |

== Notes and references ==
- Notes
- Nicolas Janberg, Structurae.com, International Database for Civil and Structural Engineering
- Others references

== See also ==
- Transport in Tunisia
- List of Roman bridges
- List of aqueducts in the Roman Empire
