= Rail transport in Tunisia =

Railway map of Tunisia

Rail Transport in Tunisia is provided by:

- Tunisian Railway National Company (SNCFT)
- Société des transports de Tunis, the manager of passenger trains including Tunis Metro, TGM, and Réseau Ferroviaire Rapide around Tunis
- Sahel Metro, company and electric train line Sousse-Monastir-Mahdia

== Railway network ==
According to SNCFT, tunisian railway network has a total length of 2170 km. 1797 km of railways are operated, out of which 1571 km is single-track and 226 km is double-track. The network comprises

- 1701 km of Metre-gauge railway, present in most of the country
- 460 km of Standard-gauge railway, present in the north
- 65 km of narrow-gauge electrified railway between Sousse and Mahdia
- 25 km of standard-gauge 25 kV AC electrified railway in Grand Tunis to the suburbs of Borj Cédria and Riadh

This does not include Tunis Metro, managed by Société des transports de Tunis, which is responsible for public transport in Tunis.

== Railway links to adjacent countries ==
- Algeria - standard-gauge, linked near the town of Ghardimaou
- Libya - railways under construction - break-of-gauge - 1,000 mm (3 ft 3 3/8 in)/1,435 mm (4 ft 8 1/2 in) until gauge conversion (some 1,000 mm or 3 ft 3 3/8 in gauge would need to be converted to 1,435 mm or 4 ft 8 1/2 in).

== See also ==
- Economy of Tunisia
- Transport in Tunisia
- Railway stations in Tunisia
