= Maghreb highway =

Road in Algeria

The Maghreb highway (in Arabic: الطريق السيارة المغاربية) is a highway through the Maghreb region of North Africa (passing through Mauritania, Morocco, Algeria, Tunisia, Libya). The highway is made up of an Atlantic main road (from Nouakchott to Rabat), and a Mediterranean main road (from Rabat to Tripoli).

== Detailed route ==
=== Moroccan part ===
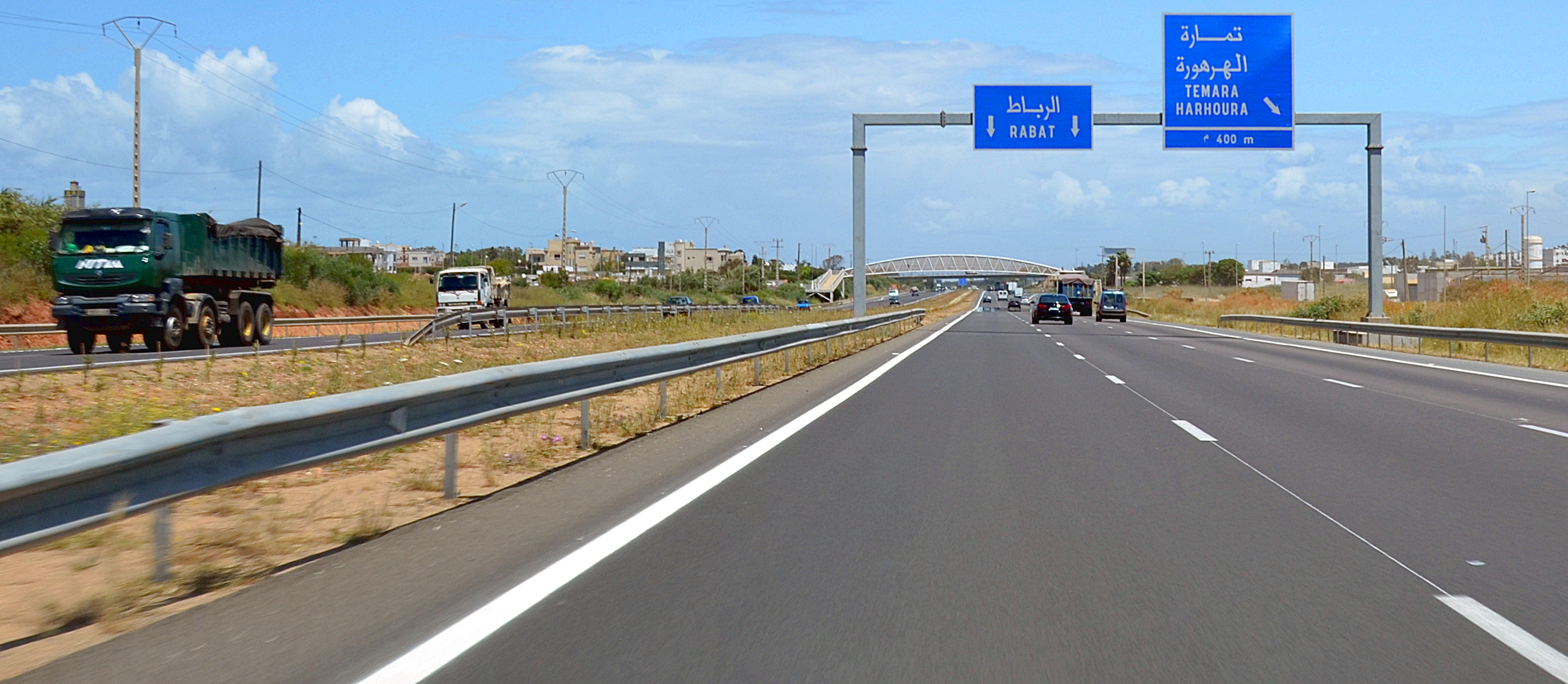
Moroccan A3 motorway linking Casablanca to Rabat.

- Agadir-Casablanca (480 km – 2010)
- Safi-Rabat (313 km – 2016)
- Rabat-Oujda (527 km – 2011)
- Fnidek-Tétouan (28 km – 2008)
- Berrechid-Béni Mellal (173 km – 2015)
- Rabat-Tanger Med (308 km – 2016)

Trans saharan expressway:

- Tiznit-Dakhla (1055 km – 2023)

=== Algerian part ===
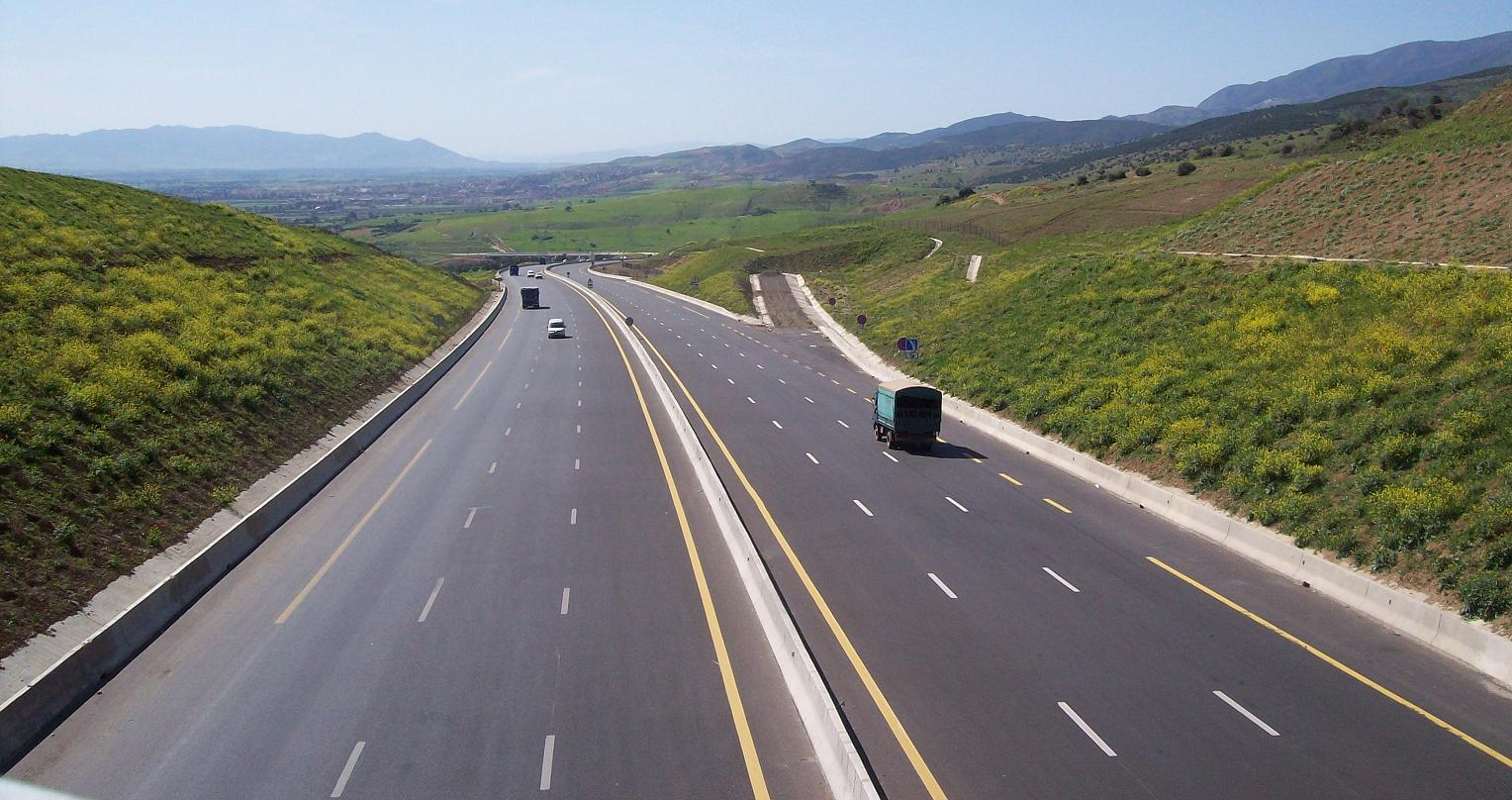
Algerian A1 motorway.

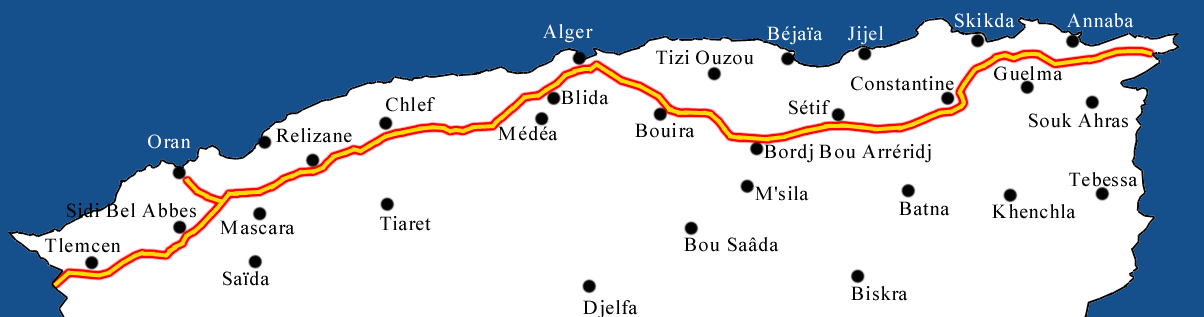
Algerian part

1,216 kilometers in Algeria from the Moroccan border to the Tunisian border (via Tlemcen, Oran, Chlef, Alger, Sétif, Constantine, Annaba and 16 others wilayas) :

- Algeria–Morocco border to Chlef (365 km via Tlemcen and Oran planned for 2010)
- Chlef-Bordj Bou Arreridj (435 km via Alger planned for 2010)
- Bordj Bou Arreridj to Algeria-Tunisia border (365 km via Sétif, Constantine, and Annaba planned for 2011)

=== Tunisian part ===
A1 & A3 Visible on this map

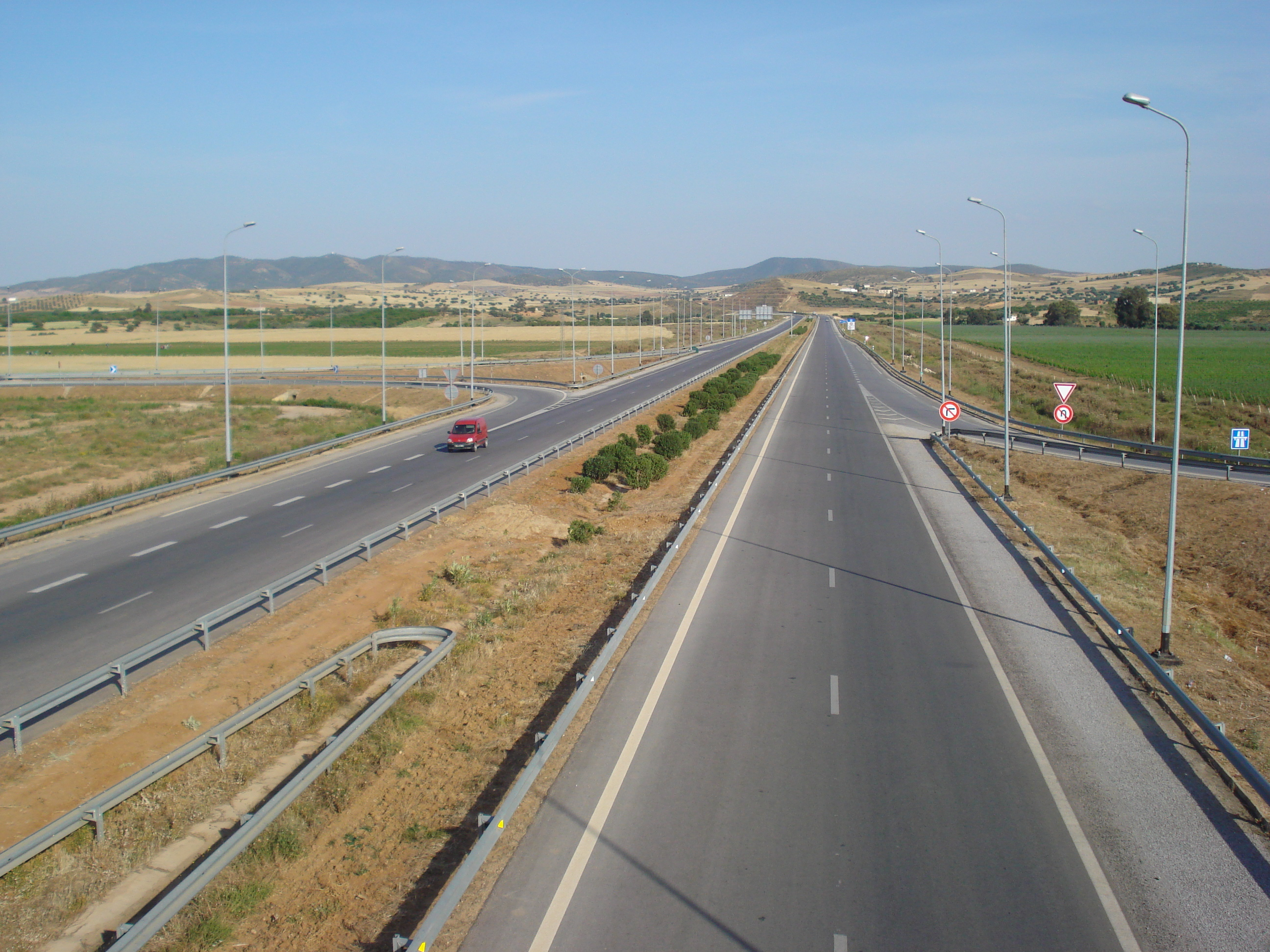
Tunisian A3 motorway

Algerian border-Tunis (207 km) :

- Algeria-Tunisia border to Bousalem (70 km planned for 2020) with two exits to Jendouba and Tabarka
- Bousalem-Oued Zarga (70 km March 2016) with an express way to Béja
- Oued Zarga-Medjez el-Bab-Tunis (67 km February 2006)

Tunis-Libyan border (573 km) :

- Tunis-Hammamet (51 km 1986)
- Hammamet-M'saken (92 km March 1994) with an exit to Sousse
- M'saken-Sfax (97 km July 2008) with an exit to Mahdia
- Sfax-Gabès (151 km May 2018)
- Gabès to Tunisia-Libya border (182 km planned to enter service in its entirety in 2020)

=== Libyan part ===
- 200 kilometers for Libya linking the Tunisia-Libya border to Tripoli tuniso-libyenne à Tripoli.

The Libyan part will be made in partnership with Italy.

== See also ==
- Transport in Tunisia
