= A2 motorway (Tunisia) =

Road connecting Tunis and Ben Guerdane

Coordinates: 34.248136°N 10.036011°E

A2 motorway

Route information
- Length: 186 km (116 mi)
- Existed: TBD–present

Major junctions
- North end: Tunis
- South end: Jilma

Location
- Country: Tunisia
- Major cities: Tunis, Zaghouan, El Fahs, Kairouan, Jilma

Highway system
- Transport in Tunisia; Motorways

The A2 Motorway is a major highway project currently under construction in Tunisia. Upon completion, it will connect the capital, Tunis, to Gafsa, with an additional branch extending to Kasserine.

In its initial phase, the motorway is planned to span 186 kilometers, linking Tunis to the town of Jilma, located approximately 50 kilometers northwest of Sidi Bouzid. On December 6, 2022, Tunisian President Kaïs Saïed officially inaugurated the construction of this first segment. As of April 2026, The Tunis-Jelma highway (A2) construction project has reached an overall completion rate of nearly 38%. The progressive opening of this strategic route is expected by early 2027.
