= Bou Salem =

Coordinates: 36°37′N 8°58′E

Bou Salem (بوسالم)
- Commune and town
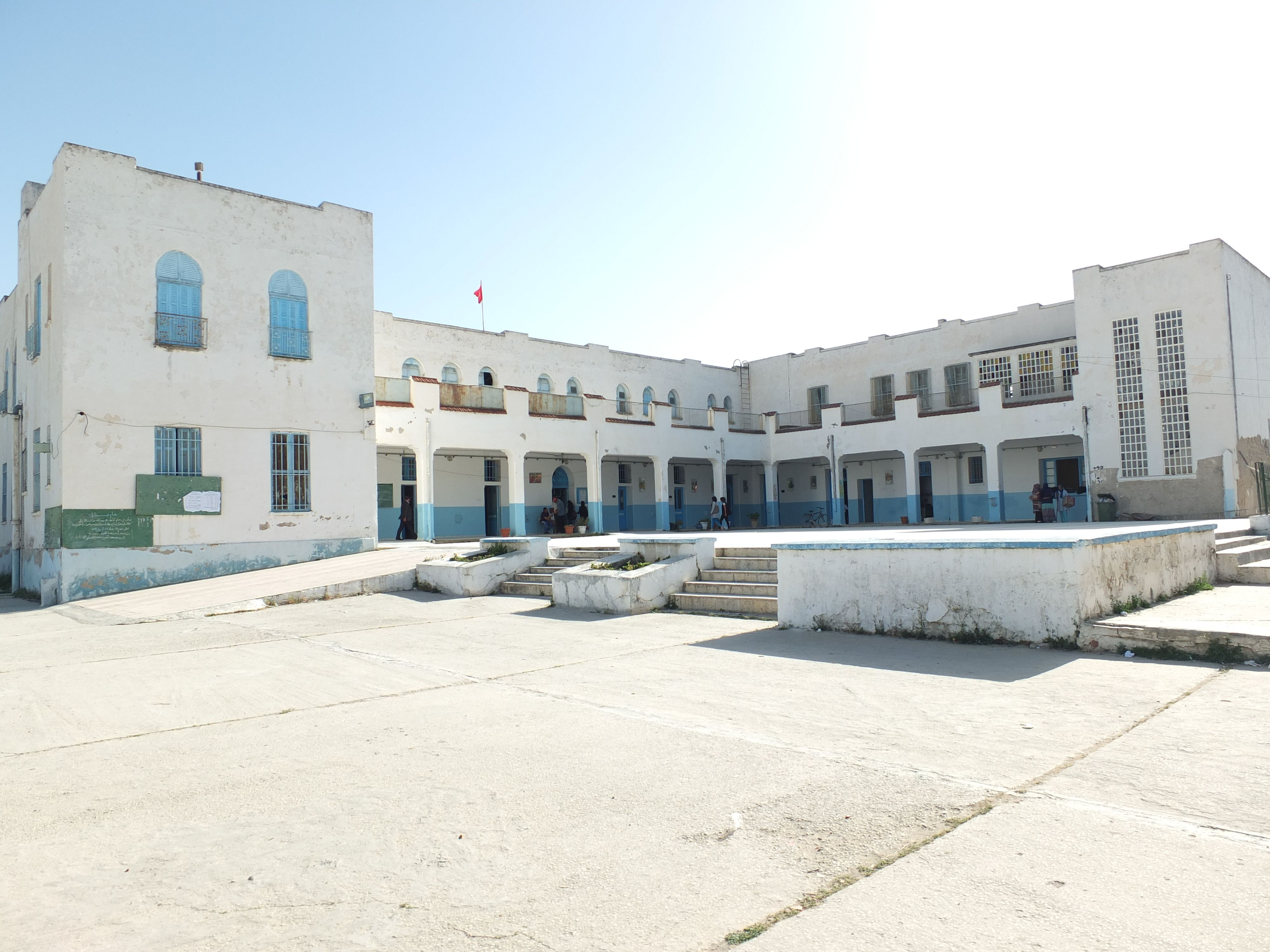
- Lycée of Bou-Salem
- Interactive map of Bou Salem
- Country: Tunisia
- Governorate: Jendouba Governorate

Population (2014)
  - Total: 14,571
- Time zone: UTC+1 (CET)
- Area code: 8170

Bou Salem (بوسالم) is a town and commune in the Jendouba Governorate, Tunisia. As of 2004 it had a population of 20,098. by 2014 this had grown 35,192.

== History ==
In Roman times, Bou Salem was the site of an imperial domain, the Saltus Burunitanus, an important Latin inscription was found three kilometers from the town; it shows the settlers of the imperial domain petition the emperor Commodus to complain about the corruption of the procurator of the field, farmers and violence of the soldiers.

The city was named Souk El Khemis ("Thursday market") until 1966, in relation to the weekly market held in what was an agricultural town. Located in the Medjerda valley, its main economic activity remains agriculture.

It is located on the territory of the Ouled Bou Salem tribe, which borders the territory of the Berber of Kroumirs. It was known as Souk El Khemis until 1966.

== Infrastructure ==
The city of Bou-salem is connected within the Tunisian Highway System since 2016 with the extension of the A3 Highway from the neighboring Governorate of Béja.

== Population ==
2014 Census
Homes	Families	Males	Females	Total
4183	3682	7108	7416	14524

== See also ==
- List of cities in Tunisia
