= Railway stations in Libya =

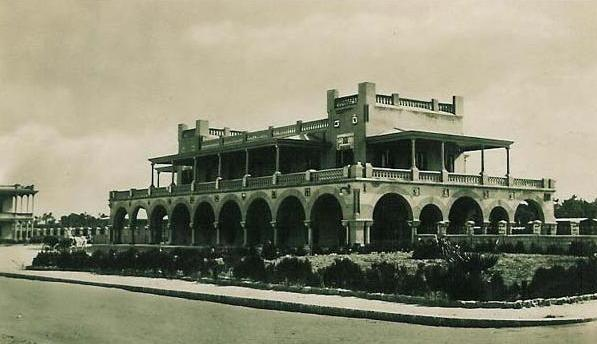
Tripoli Railway Station in 1940

Few railway stations were built in Libya during the 20th century. The ones that were built were by the Italians from the 1920s as part of their colonial administration. Today there are no functioning railway stations active in the country, but new ones are planned, as part of a new railroad system.

== History ==
Between 1920 and 1936 the Italians built some five small railways in Italian Libya. Served by a host of small stations, the Kingdom of Italy built nearly 400 km of railways with 950 mm (3 ft 1 3/8 in) gauge during their rule of the region.

Nearly 40 minor and major railways stations were built in Libya by the Italians. The biggest and most important was located in Italian Tripoli. In 1965, the last remaining stations in Benghazi and Suluq were closed. No Italian-era stations are currently active.

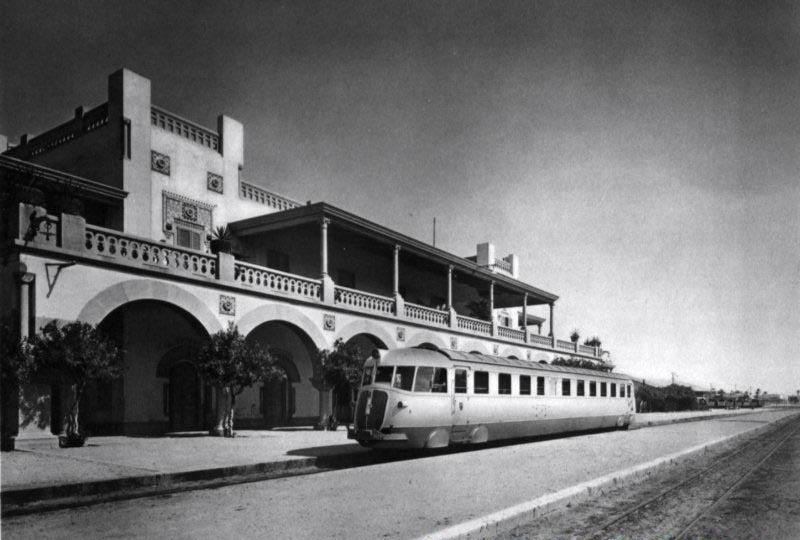
Fiat train "Littorina" at Tripoli Station

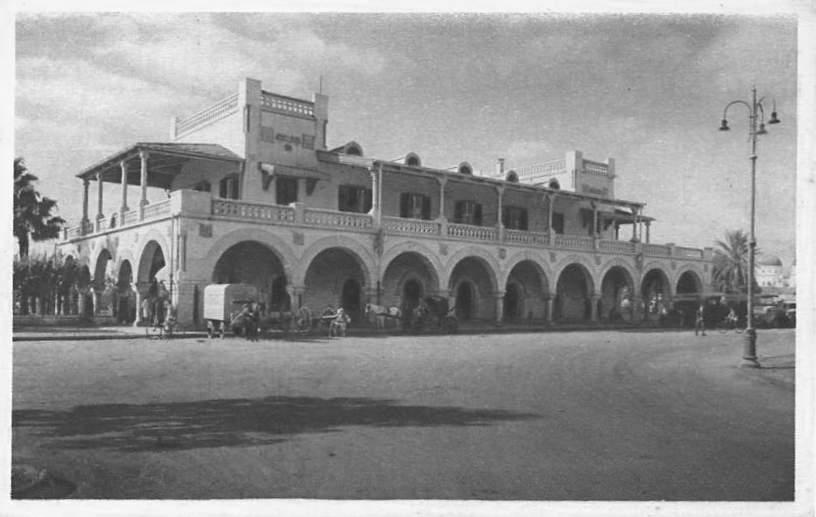
Benghazi Railway Station in 1930

By the 1960s, there were only two small railways in Libya, departing from Benghazi and serving classical Littorine: Benghazi-Barce and Benghazi-Soluch. In 1965 last remaining stations in Benghazi and Soluch closed. Today no active railway exists in Libya.

=== Tripoli Station ===
Tripoli station in the capital Tripoli, was the main terminal for western Libya, not far from the port and the Tripoli International Fair. The station was connected to the stations of Zuara, Tagiura and Garian by small but very active railways.

=== Benghazi Station ===
Benghazi station was the second in importance, located in downtown Benghazi. It closed in 1963, when the last small railway of former Italian Libya, the Benghazi-Solluch line, was closed and dismantled.

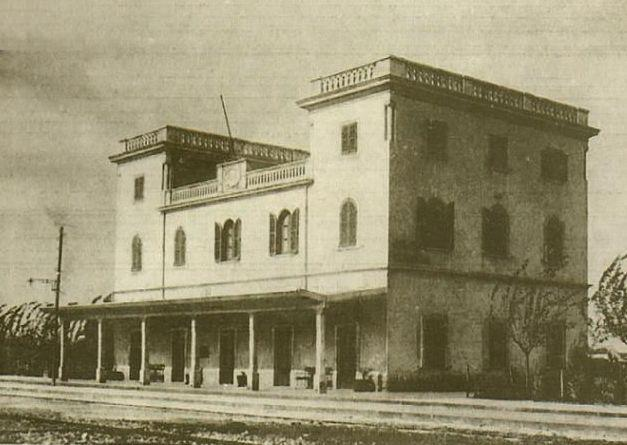
Barce Railway station in 1930

=== Secondary Stations ===
Other important railways stations were those in:

- Barce
- Zuara
- Garian
- Soluch
- Tagiura

== New railway stations ==
Plans for a new rail network, complete with stations have been under development for some time since the end of the 20th century. In the first years of the 21st century an ambitious railway plan was drawn up, with the support of former dictator Gaddafi. With backing from Russian Railways and China, work started in September 2008 with earthworks begun between Sirte and Ras Ajdir, Tunisia border, in 2001-5, and in 2008 and 2009 various contracts were placed and construction work started on a 1,435 mm (4 ft 8 1/2 in) standard gauge railway parallel to the coast from the Tunisian border at Ras Ajdir to Tripoli, and on to Misrata, Sirte, Benghazi and Bayda. Another railway line will run inland from Misrata to Sabha at the centre of a mineral-rich area. However, due to the ongoing conflict as a result of the Libyan Civil War, no new work on the rail network has been carried out since 2012.

== Bibliography ==
- Le ferrovie coloniali italiane in Libia (in Italian)

== See also ==
- Italian Libya Railways
- Italian Libya
