= Fifth Bridge of Béja =

Fifth Bridge of Béja قنطرة الخمسة بباجة
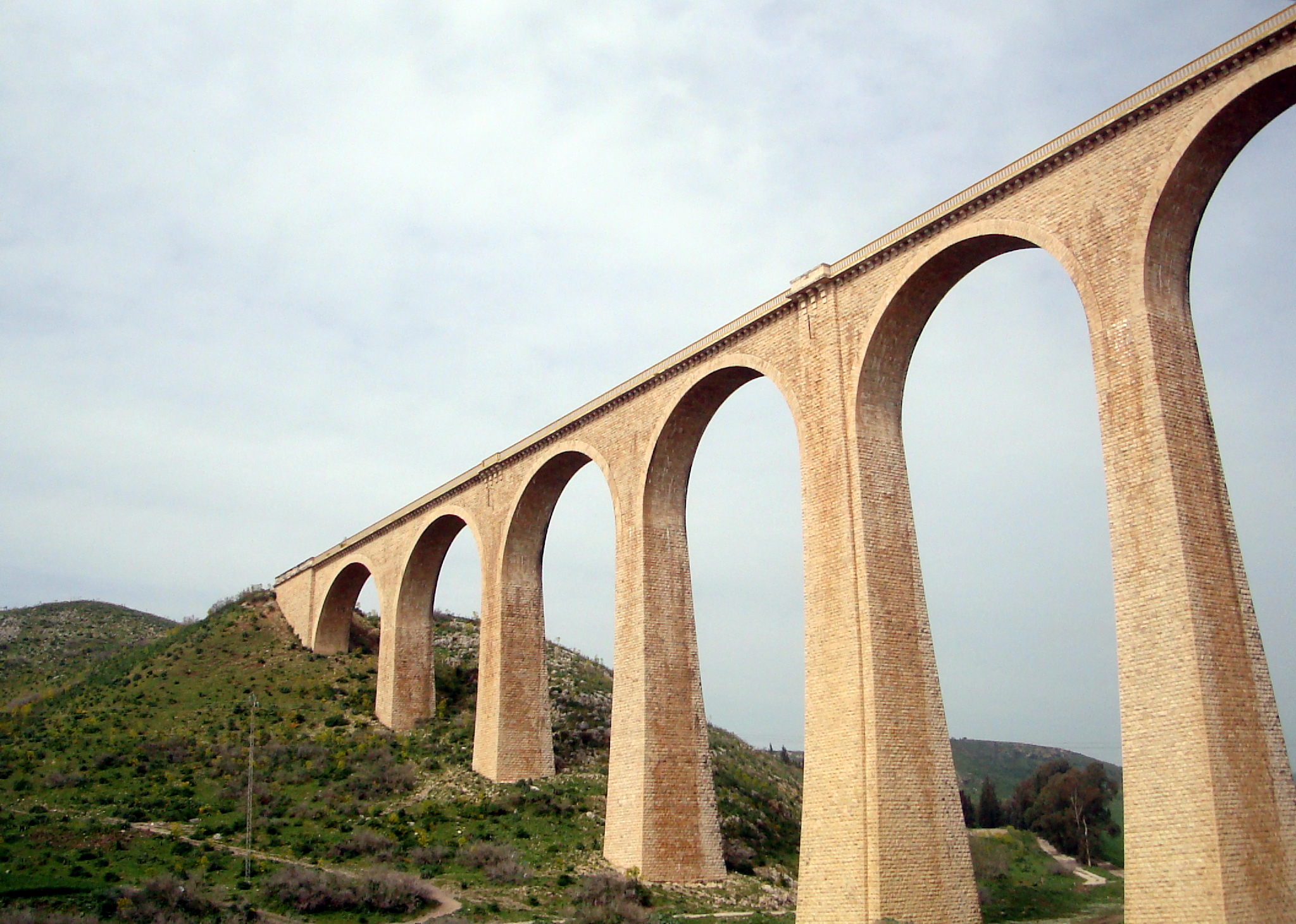
- The Fifth Bridge of Béja in 23 March 2010
- Coordinates: 36°46′N 9°12′E
- Locale: Béja, Tunisia
- Begins: 1912
- Ends: 1915

Characteristics
- Total length: 350
- Width: 23,5
- Height: 38

The Fifth Bridge of Béja is a railway bridge on the line connecting the Tunisian cities of Béja and Tunis. It is named in memory of the 5th Engineer Regiment which carried out the route between Béja and Mateur and built a temporary bridge over the Béja wadi to facilitate the construction of the viaduct. It is composed of twelve semicircular arches connecting the two banks of the valley. Before 1977, the line connected Béja and Bizerte before being diverted to Tunis due to the construction of the Sidi Salem Dam.

== See also ==
- List of bridges in Tunisia
