= A4 motorway (Tunisia) =

Motorway in Tunisia

Coordinates: 35.899179°N 8.555905°E

A4 motorway

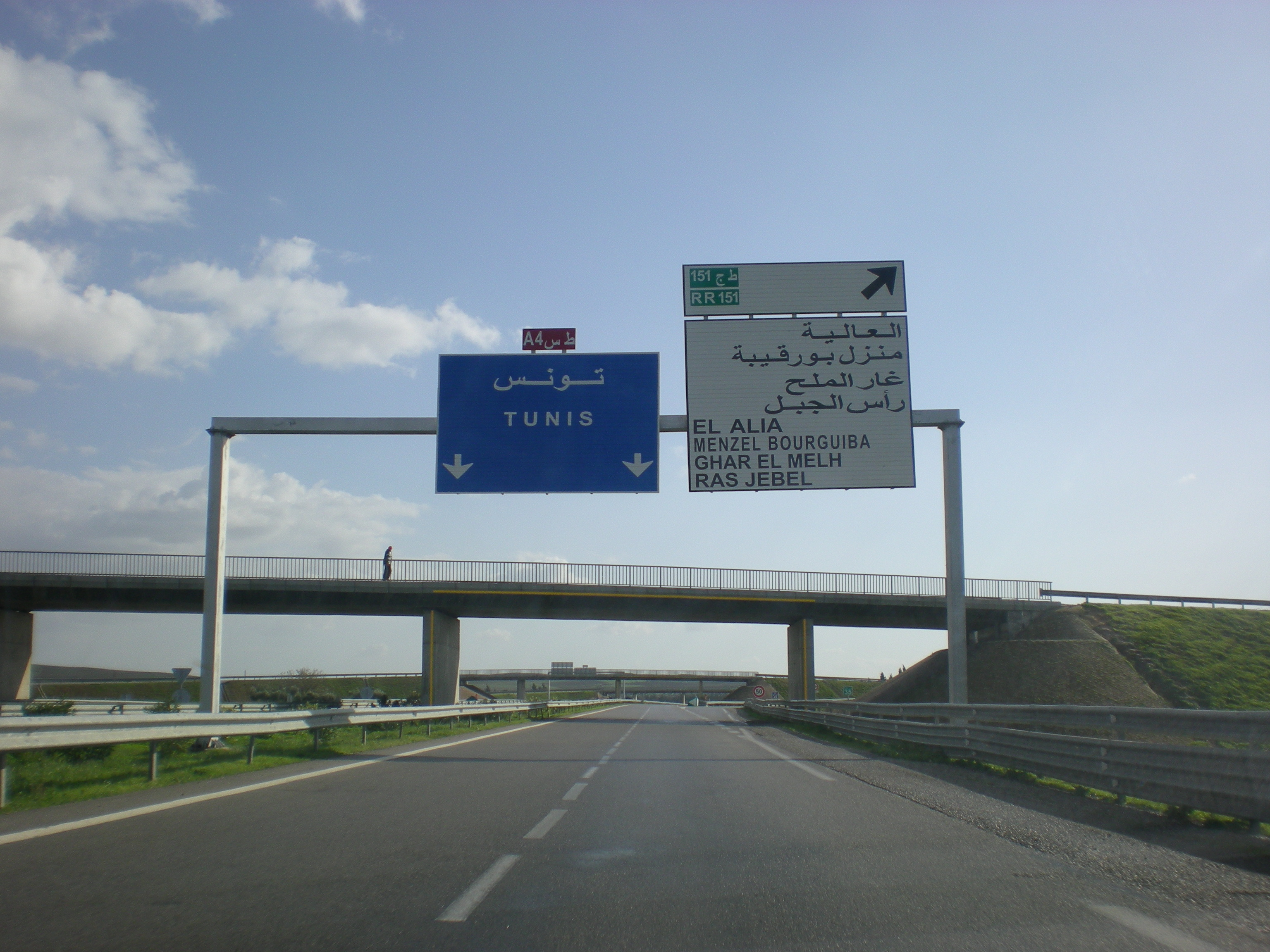

Route information
- Length: 51 km (32 mi)
- Existed: July 1, 2002–present

Major junctions
- South end: Tunis
- North end: Bizerte

Location
- Country: Tunisia
- Major cities: Tunis, Utique, El Alia, Menzel Bourguiba, Bizerte

Highway system
- Transport in Tunisia; Motorways

The A4 is a motorway connecting Tunis and Bizerte.

== History ==
As part of Tunisia's infrastructure development program aimed at connecting the country's major cities through a network of strategic highways, construction of the A4 motorway commenced on 15 October 1999 under the Eighth Development Plan and was completed on 1 July 2002. The project cost a total of 179 million Tunisian dinar, and toll operations were introduced on 29 May 2003.

== Route Description ==
Extending for 51 kilometers, the A4 motorway is equipped with two interchanges, three major bridges, a service and rest area, and four toll plazas, occupying a total area of eleven hectares. The motorway operates under a closed toll system, whereby toll fees are calculated according to the distance traveled: 25 millimes per kilometer for light vehicles and 60 millimes per kilometer for heavy vehicles. The A4 is also linked to the Tunis–Sfax motorway through an expressway designed to bypass Grand Tunis. At the time, this connection was nearing completion, the overpass at the junction near Mohamed V Avenue had already been opened to traffic on 21 July 2008. Once fully completed, the bypass would enable motorists to travel around the capital without encountering a single traffic signal. The motorway has an overall width of 34 meters, including a 12-meter-wide central median, providing sufficient space for a future expansion from two to three lines in each direction.

== Service Areas ==
The motorway has a single service area, located in Utica.

== Sensitive Areas ==
The section of the motorway passing through the forests between El Alia and Menzel Jemil poses a risk during the winter due to the presence of wild boars. This danger has been mitigated with the installation of a protective barrier.

== Extension ==
The A4 was later extended from El Alia interchange to the city of Menzel Bourguiba through the construction of a 25 kilometer expressway, which opened at the end of summer 2006.

== Gallery ==
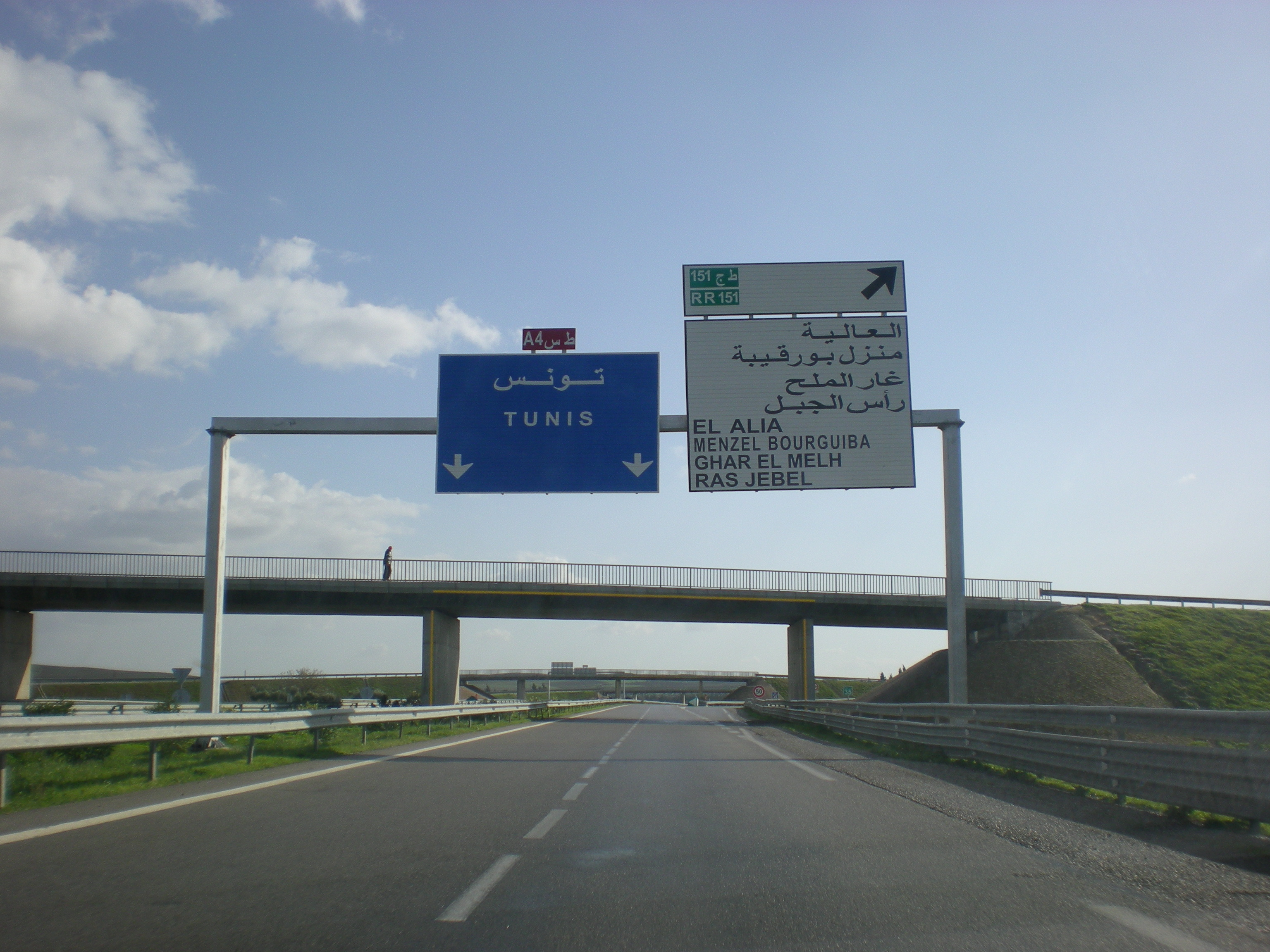
A4 Motorway at the El Alia Interchange

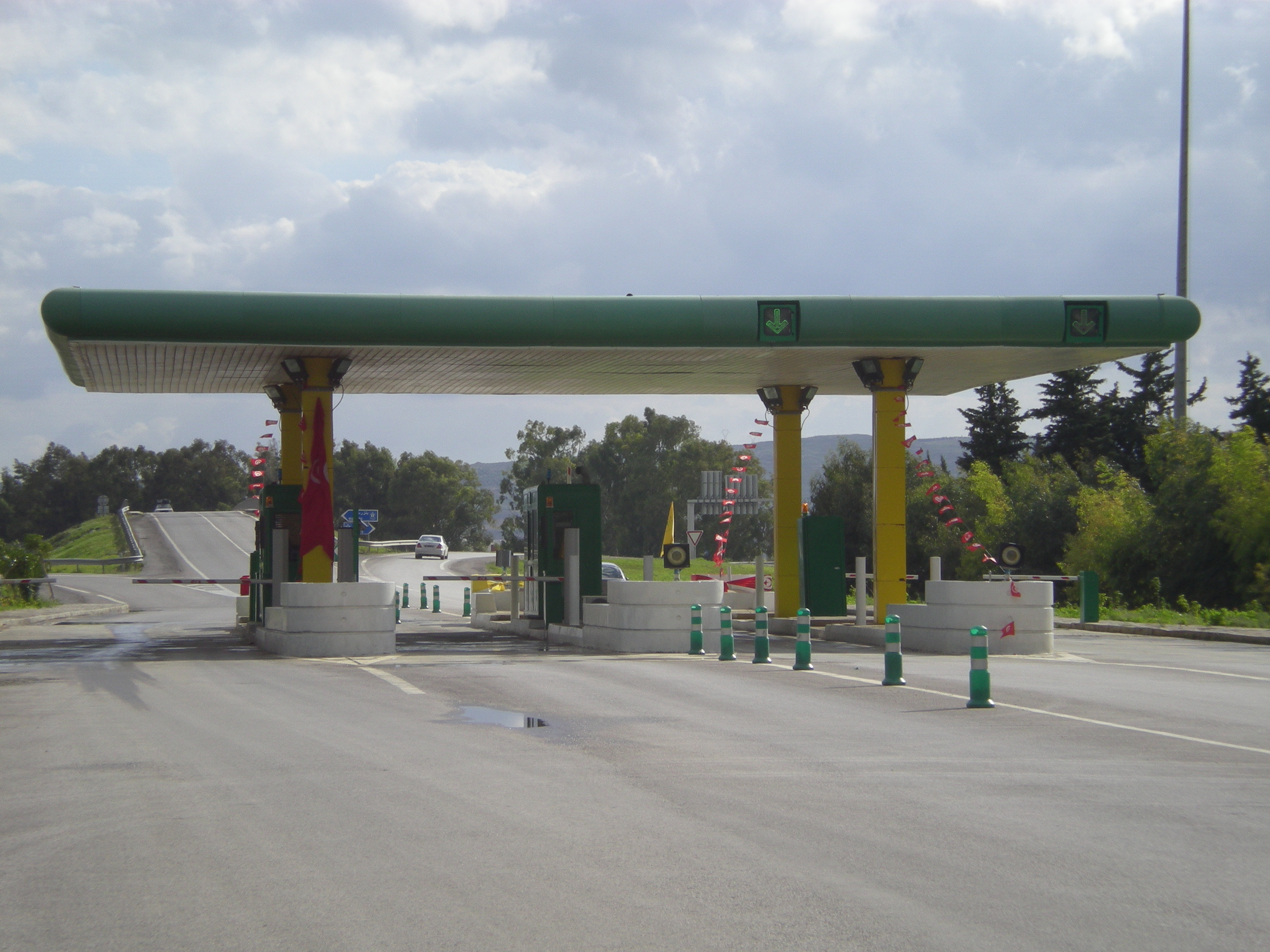
The Utica Toll Plaza

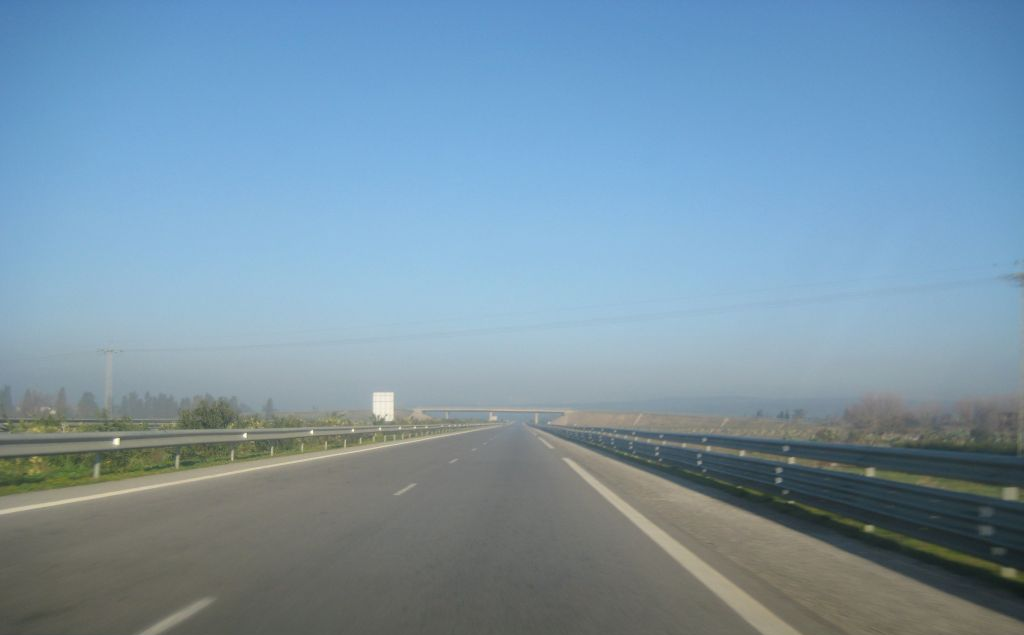
View of the A4 heading toward Bizerte

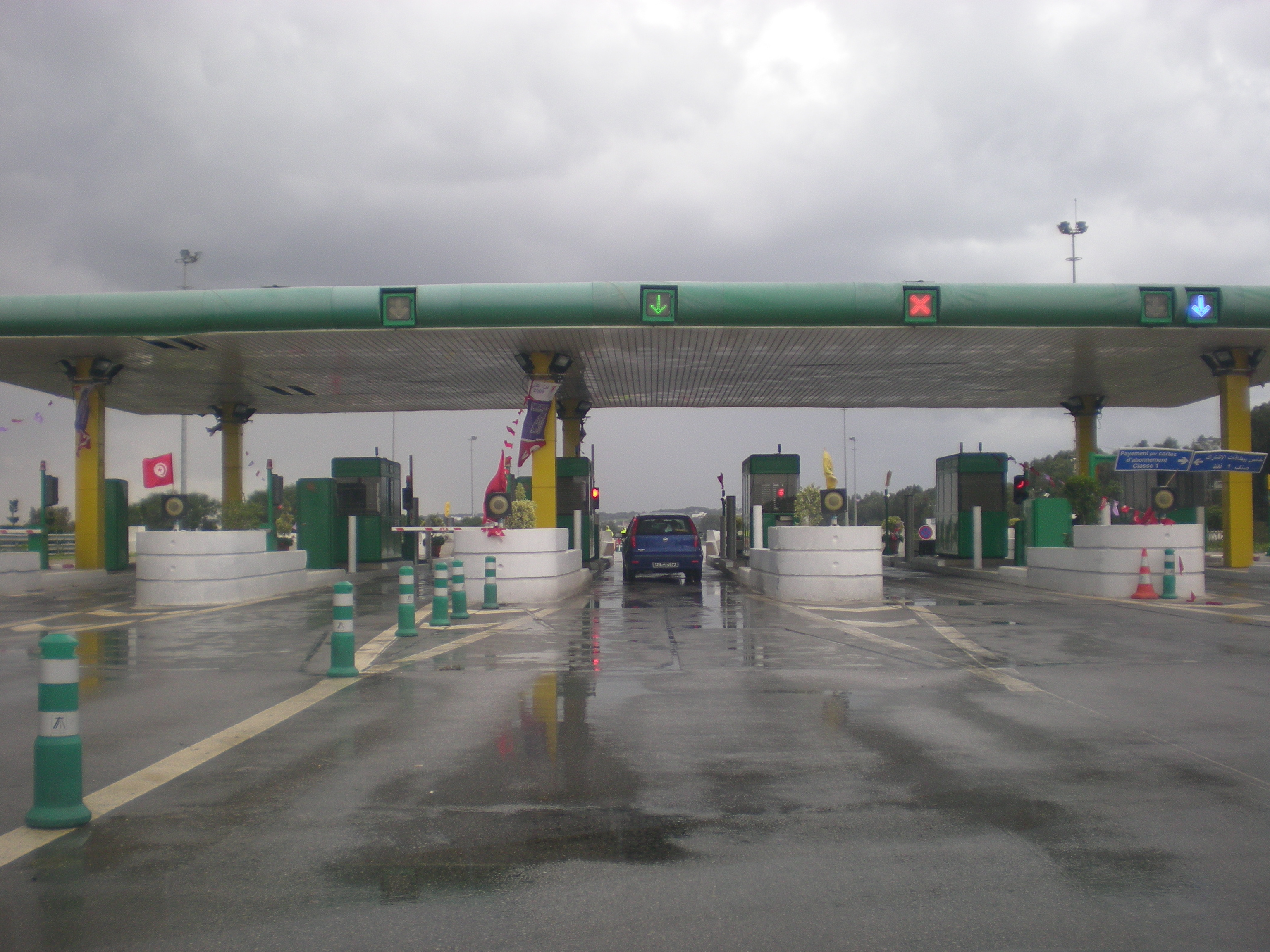
Toll in Menzel Jemil
