= Rail transport in Libya =

There have been no operational railways in Libya since 1965, but various lines existed in the past. Since 1998, plans for an extensive system have been developed, but work has largely halted since the outbreak of the First Libyan Civil War in 2011.

== History ==
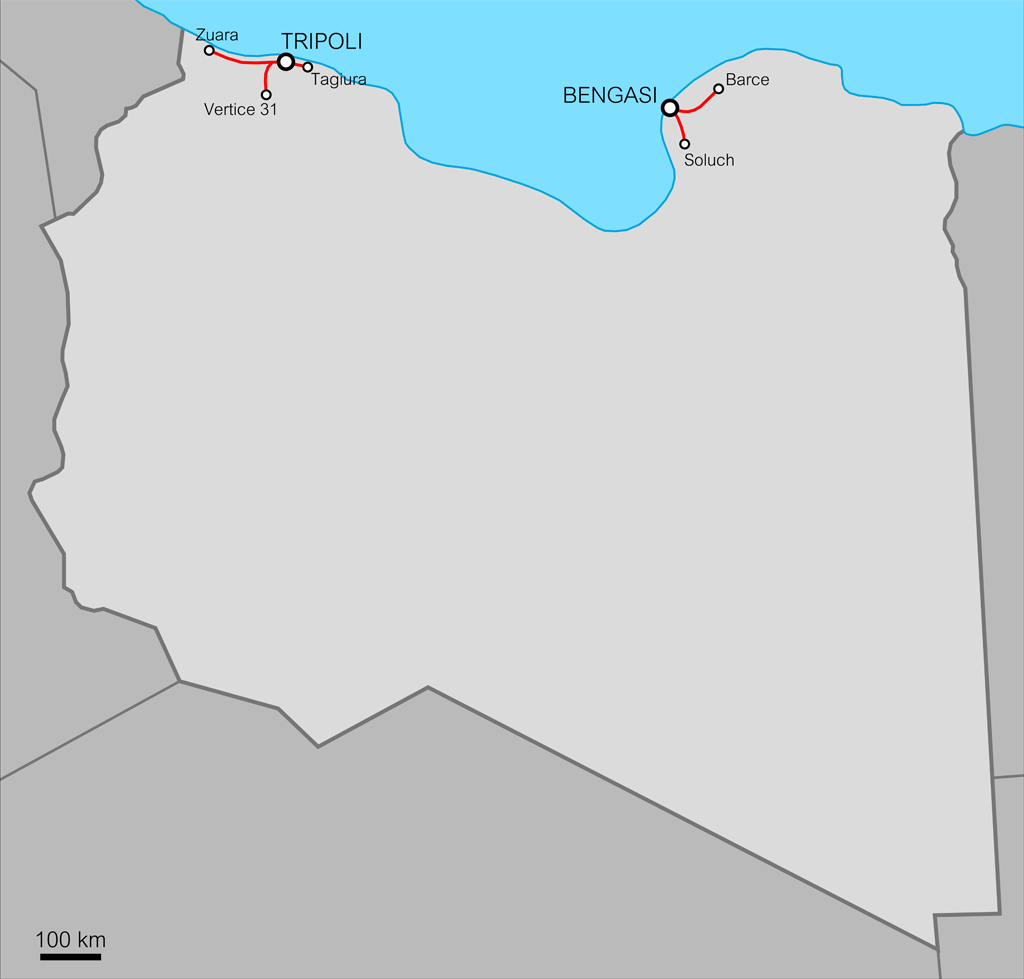
Map of the colonial railway in Libya before the 1960s

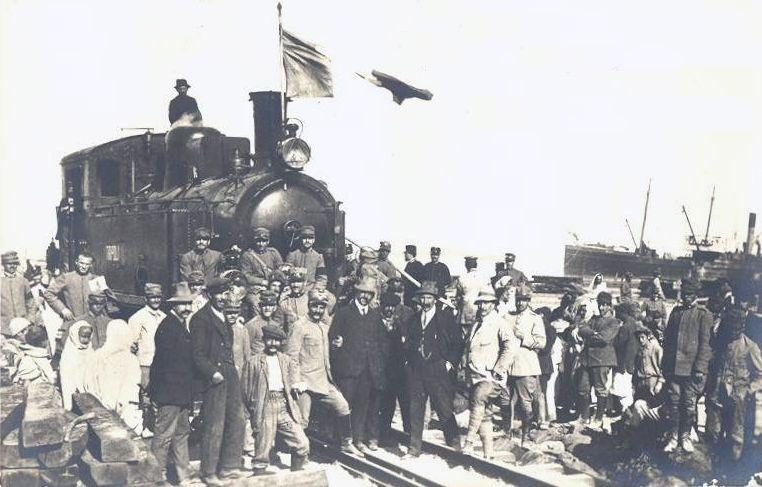
Arrival of the first locomotive in the harbour of Tripoli, around 1912, with an Italian flag affixed to it.

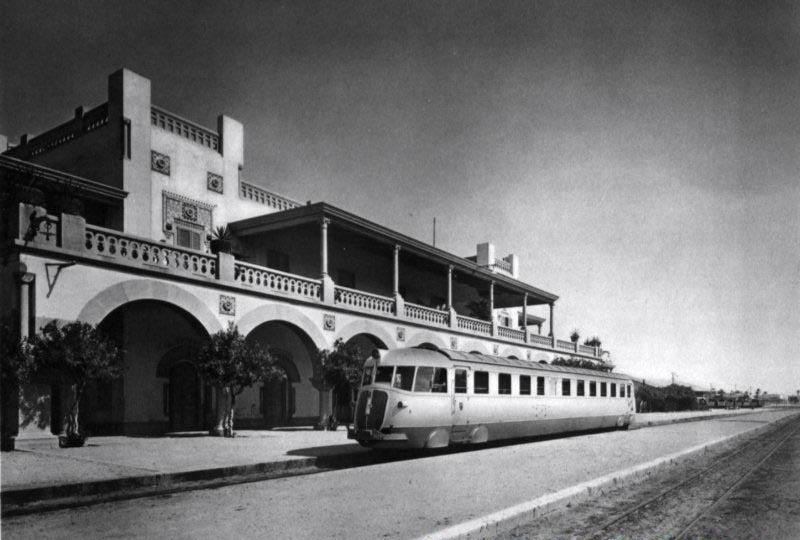
Littorina passing Tripoli Central Railway Station in the 1930s

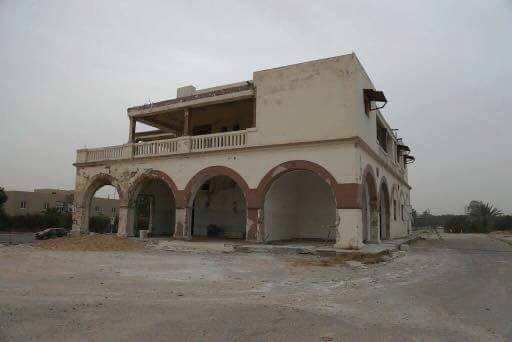
Janzour Railway Station in 2016

Despite sporadic extensions during World War II, Libya's pre-independence railway network remained significantly limited due to prioritizing road infrastructure and political instability under the Kingdom of Italy and subsequent regimes. The Kingdom of Italy built in 400 km of railways in Libya, with a gauge of 950 mm (3 ft 1 3/8 in). A network centred on Tripoli was opened from 17 March 1912 as part of the Italian occupation campaign. This extended from Tripoli 120 km west to Zuwara, 100 km south to Gharyan, and 10 km east to Tajura.

A 750 mm (2 ft 5 1/2 in) (later 950 mm) gauge railway was built east from Benghazi. The main route to Marj, 110 km long, was opened in stages between 1911 and 1927. Benghazi also had a 56 km branch to Suluq, opened in 1926. In summer 1941, the Italians started to build a Tripoli-Benghazi railway, but their defeat in World War II meant that work only progressed a few kilometres.

Military extensions of some 40 km were made from Marj towards Derna in World War II. This was the final line to close, at the end of 1965.

=== Standard gauge ===
During World War II, the 1,435 mm (4 ft 8 1/2 in) standard gauge Western Desert Extension railway was built from a junction 10 km east of Mersa Matruh in Egypt, to assist in the Allied defence of the area, and later the Allied advance across North Africa. The coastal railway had reached Sidi Barrani by October 1941 and Tobruk by December 1942, 640 km (400 mi) west of El Alamein. The 125 km Libyan section, west of Sallum, on the Egyptian border, was removed following its closure on 20 December 1946, but the Egyptian Railways Sollum line still sees occasional freight. Though dismantled post-war, the Western Desert Extension's construction during WWII underscores the strategic value of a north-south Libyan rail link, highlighting potential for future development beyond Egypt's existing network.

== Plans ==
Beginning in 1998, the Libyan government has been planning for a 3170 km 1,435 mm (4 ft 8 1/2 in) (standard gauge) network. A line parallel to the coast will eventually form part of a North African link between Tunisia and Egypt. The section from the border with Tunisia at Ras Ajdir, then via Tripoli to Sirte was under construction and was planned to open in 2009. China Railway Construction Corporation has contracts to start work in June 2008 on a 352 km route between Sirte and Khoms, to be finished by 2013. The east–west line will be double track.

A second line will run 800 km from iron ore deposits at Wadi Shati near Sabha to the steel works and port at Misrata from 2012.

A third line will run 554km from Sirte to Benghazi in the East. In October 2007, RZD submitted a feasibility study for the project, and in 2008 signed a contract to begin construction, which was planned to take 4 years to complete. Work began on 30 August 2008. In August 2010, RZD awarded Ansaldo STS and SELEX Communications a contract to install signalling, telecoms, power, security and ticketing systems which was expected to take three years. Ansaldo STS and SELEX Communications worked on signaling on new lines between Sirte and the Tunisian border, and the route to Sabha.

A trans-Saharan line was also planned, running south to Niger.

Construction ceased during the Libyan Civil War.

As of March 2012, plans were delayed until further notice

In February 2013, the pre-revolution railway project was approved for resumption by the government.

In June 2022, due to the end of the second civil war and subsequent stability, tests of rolling stock between Khoms Port and Khoms city main station restarted using old (presumably) Egyptian equipment.

== Rolling stock ==
On 10 June 2007 a contract was signed with American General Electric Co. for supply of locomotives and training of Libyan nationals in operational and maintenance work. The contract includes the import of spare parts and technical assistance. The first shipment will arrive Libya by mid-2009. Libya was given one IC4 diesel multiple unit from AnsaldoBreda as a gift for the 40th anniversary of Muammar Gaddafi's ascent to power.

In November 2021, the Libyan Ministry of Transportation planned to purchase CR200JS-G EDMUs and DF11G diesel locomotives for Libyan railway operations.

== Timeline ==
=== 1912 ===
- Italian Libya Railways opens.

=== 1965 ===
- Italian Libyan Railways closes.

=== 1998 ===
- Libya signed contracts with Bahne of Egypt and Jez Sistemas Ferroviarios for the supply of crossings and pointwork.

=== 2008 ===
- November – GE to supply 15 diesel locomotives.
- 30 August – Russian Railways begins work on 554 km Sirte to Benghazi railway.
- 25 April – Russia to build coastal line from Sirte eastwards to Benghazi, approximately 500 km. This extends another project to build a 352 km line running from Sirte westwards via Misrata to Khoms.
- China Railway Construction wins $2.6b bids in Libya. A west-to-east coastal railway 352 km from Khoms to Sirte and a south-to-west railway 800 km long for iron ore transport from the southern city Sabha to Misrata.

=== 2009 ===
- January – China Railway Construction signs contract to build 172 km from Tripoli to Ras Ajdir

=== 2010 ===
- March – First 14 km of 554 km long Russian Railways Sirte – Benghazi track in place. The total track laying is expected to take four years.

=== 2011 ===
- March – China Railway Group suspended work on the 3 projects valued in total at $4.24 billion with $3.55 billion of the project yet to be finished due to the rising violence levels in the Libyan Civil War.

=== 2013 ===
- February – Talks started between RZD and Libyan authorities to resume construction

== See also ==
- Economy of Libya
- Transport in Libya
