= Riadh, Tunisia =

Town in Tunisia

Riadh is a town in Tunisia, near the capital city of Tunis.

== Transport ==
In June 2012, an electrified railway service opened from the capital city of Tunis.

== See also ==
- Rail transport in Tunisia
- Transport in Tunisia
