= Sidi el Barrak Dam =

Dam in Beja, Tunisia

Sidi El Barrak Dam
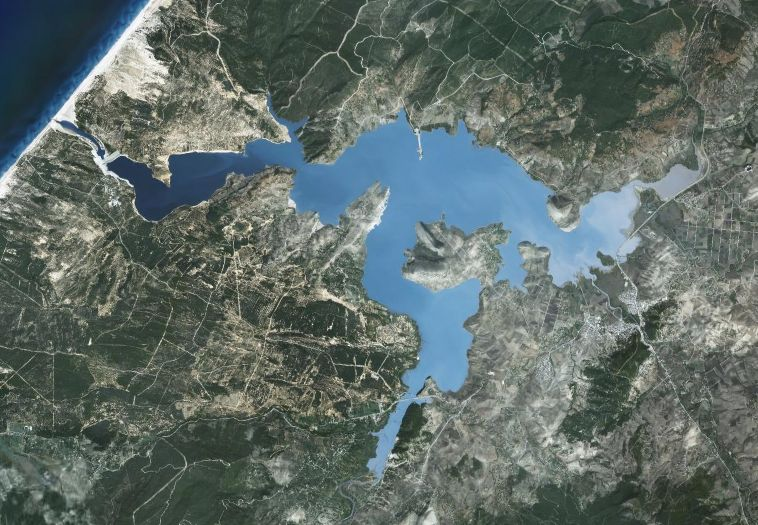
- Overhead of dam and reservoir

- Location within Tunisia
- Official name: Barrage Sidi El Barrak
- Country: Tunisia
- Coordinates: 37°01′29″N 08°56′11″E
- Construction began: 1994
- Opening date: 2000

Dam and spillways
- Type of dam: Embankment
- Impounds: Oued Zouara River
- Height: 30 m (98 ft)
- Length: 500 m (1,640 ft)
- Dam volume: 2,700,000 m^{3} (3,531,467 cu yd)
- Spillway capacity: 517 m^{3}/s (18,258 cu ft/s)

Reservoir
- Total capacity: 264,000,000 m^{3} (214,028 acre⋅ft)

Ramsar Wetland
- Official name: Barrage de Sidi El Barrak
- Designated: 2 February 2012
- Reference no.: 2017

The Sidi El Barrak Dam is an embankment dam centred 18 km (11 mi) northeast of Tabarka and 2 km (1 mi) from the Mediterranean Sea on the Oued Zouara River in the Beja Governorate, Tunisia. Constructed between 1994 and 2000, the primary purpose of the dam is water supply. As part of the Sidi el Barrak Development Project, water stored in the dam is pumped to the Seyjame Dam, at a rate of 265,000,000 m^{3} (214,839 acre⋅ft) annually. This water is supplied to Tunis, Cap Bon and the Sahel including Sfax for municipal use as well as agricultural purposes. The entire project was completed in 2002.
