= Radès–La Goulette bridge =

Road and rail bridge in north Tunisia

Radès–La Goulette bridge جسر رادس–حلق الوادي
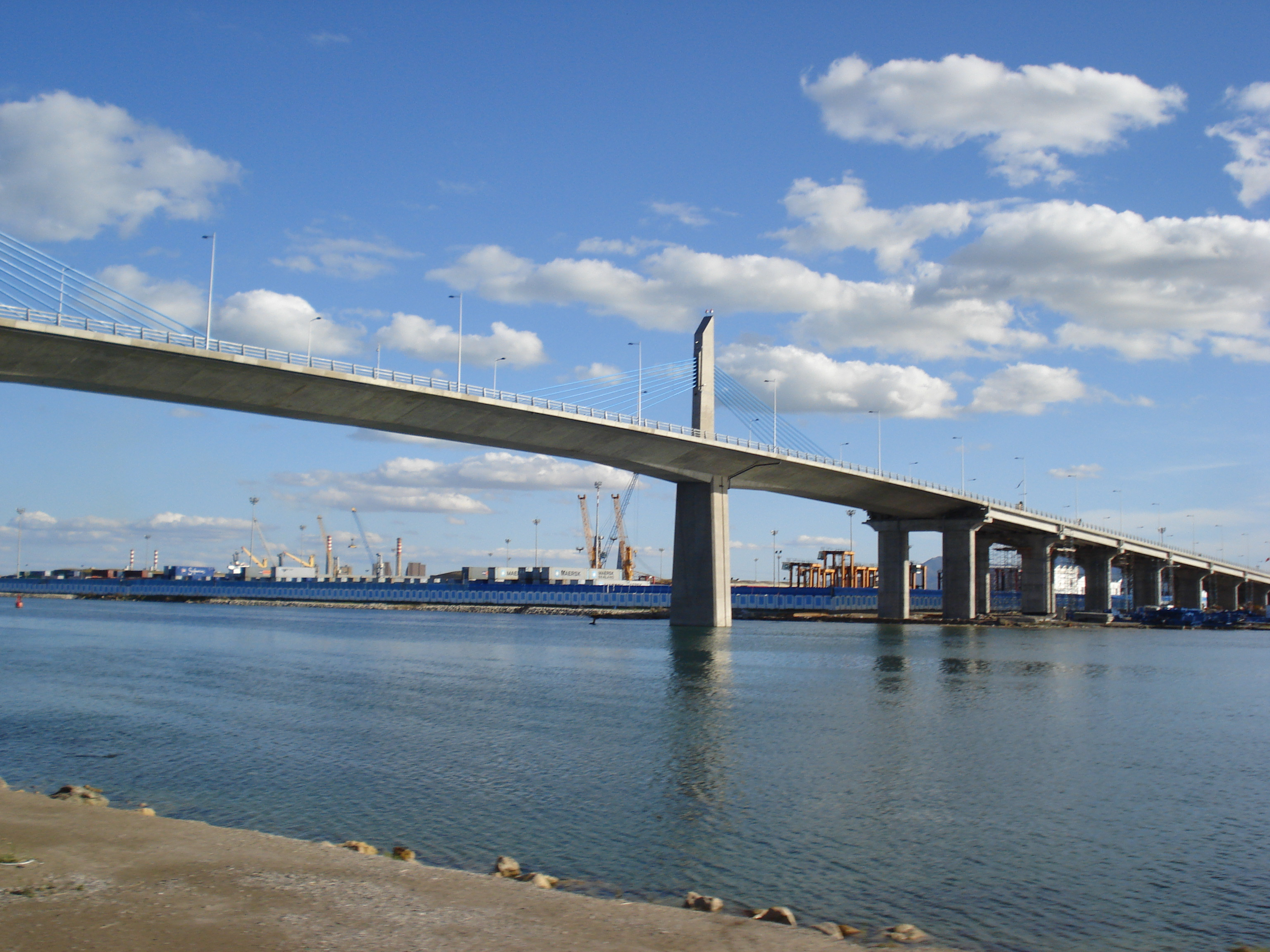
- Radès–La Goulette bridge in 1 February 2009
- Coordinates: 36°48′27.7″N 10°15′36.3″E
- Begins: 2004
- Ends: 2009

Characteristics
- Total length: 260
- Width: 23.5
- Height: 20

History
- Opened: 21 March 2009

Location
- Interactive map of Radès–La Goulette bridge

The Radès–La Goulette bridge is an extradosed cable-stayed bridge spanning the lake of Tunis, more precisely the channel as well as the expressway and the Tunis-Goulette-Marsa line linking Tunis to La Goulette.

The largest bridge in Tunisia, it was inaugurated on 21 March 2009 by President Zine El Abidine Ben Ali. It then replaces the ferry service which until then ensured the crossing of vehicles.

== Structure ==
The concrete structure is divided into three spans measuring 70, 120 and 70 meters respectively. The deck, placed 20 meters above sea level, is held by two towers 45 meters high. 23.5 meters wide, it is divided into two lanes measuring 3.5 meters each, two hard shoulders measuring two meters each and a central reservation measuring 2.5 meters.

Two access structures have been developed: the exchanger to the north is made up of multiple curved boxes cast on a hanger and the bridge to the south is made up of prestressed prefabricated beams. The interchange, which connects the bridge and the Tunis-La Goulette expressway, includes four bridges and several ramps; it is the most expensive part of the project since it represents 42% of the overall cost and required the backfilling of 25 hectares on the lake (400,000 m2 of backfill).

== Construction ==
Studies for the project lasted from December 2000 to May 2002. Launched in August 2004, work on the cable-stayed bridge, the first of its kind in Tunisia and Africa, was carried out by Tunisian, Japanese (Taisei and Kajima), Egyptian ( Arab Contractors) and French companies (VSL for the stays), and benefit from the support of several French design offices (SITES SAS for the instrumentation and monitoring); the project manager is a group of Japanese and Tunisian design offices. The cost, estimated at 141 million dinars, is jointly financed by Tunisia and the Japan Bank for International Cooperation.

The structure opened to traffic on 21 March 2009, two years after the initial date of completion of the work, a delay caused in particular by the nature of the soil.

== Environment ==
A 2.6 kilometer long dual carriageway connects the bridge to the RR33 regional road, on the Radès side, and a 6.5 kilometer long dual carriageway connects it to the La Marsa–Gammarth expressway.

== See also ==
- List of bridges in Tunisia
