= Jilma =

Coordinates: 35°16′N 9°26′E

Jilma جلمة
- Commune and town
- Jelma Center Junction, 2026
- Interactive map of Jilma
- Country: Tunisia
- Governorate: Sidi Bouzid Governorate

Population (2014)
  - Total: 5,887
- Time zone: UTC+1 (CET)

Jilma is a town and commune in the Sidi Bou Zid Governorate, Tunisia. As of 2004 it had a population of 5,405.

== Population ==
2014 Census (Municipal)
Homes	Families	Males	Females	Total
1471	1270	2858	2963	5821

== See also ==
- List of cities in Tunisia
