= A3 motorway (Tunisia) =

Motorway in Tunisia

Coordinates: 36.766718°N 10.069556°E

A3 motorway

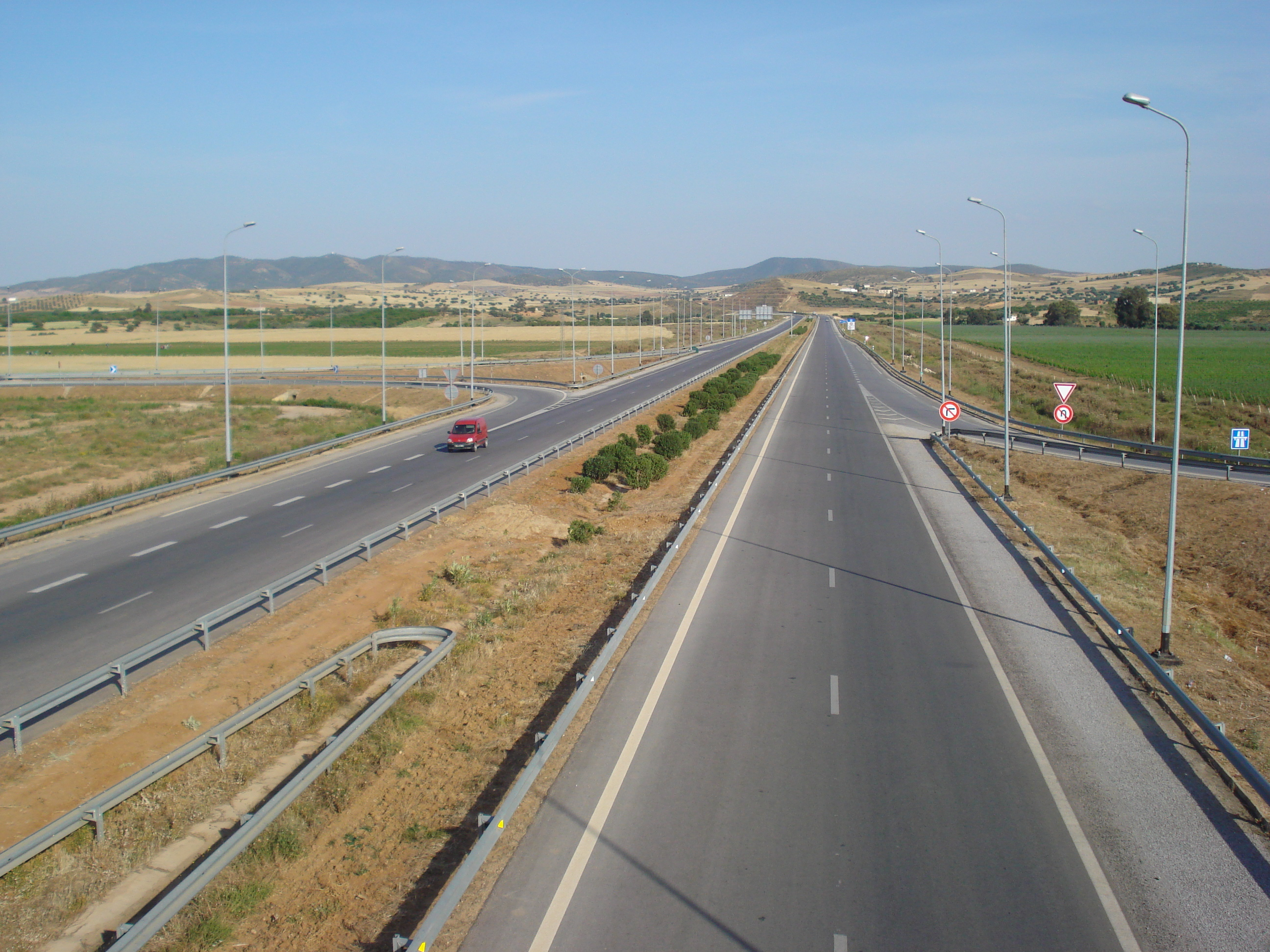

Route information
- Length: 121 km (75 mi)
- Existed: July 2005–present

Major junctions
- East end: Tunis
- West end: Bou Salem

Location
- Country: Tunisia
- Major cities: Tunis, Medjez el-Bab, Oued Zarga, Béja, Bou Salem

Highway system
- Transport in Tunisia; Motorways

The A3 motorway links Tunis, the capital city of Tunisia, and the city of Bou Salem 121 kilometres (75 mi) away. The Tunisian government plans to extend the highway a further 80 kilometres (50 mi) from its current limit to reach the Algerian Border, with a total distance of 201 kilometres (125 mi).

The first section, linking Tunis to Medjez el-Bab, opened in July 2005. The whole project, including the section linking Medjez el-Bab to Oued Zarga, 66,3 km long, was inaugurated on February 20, 2006. A 54 kilometer long extension to the city of Bou Salem in the country's northwesternmost governorate Jendouba started in May 2012 and was inaugurated on November 26, 2016.
