= Sidi Salem Dam =

Dam in Tunisia

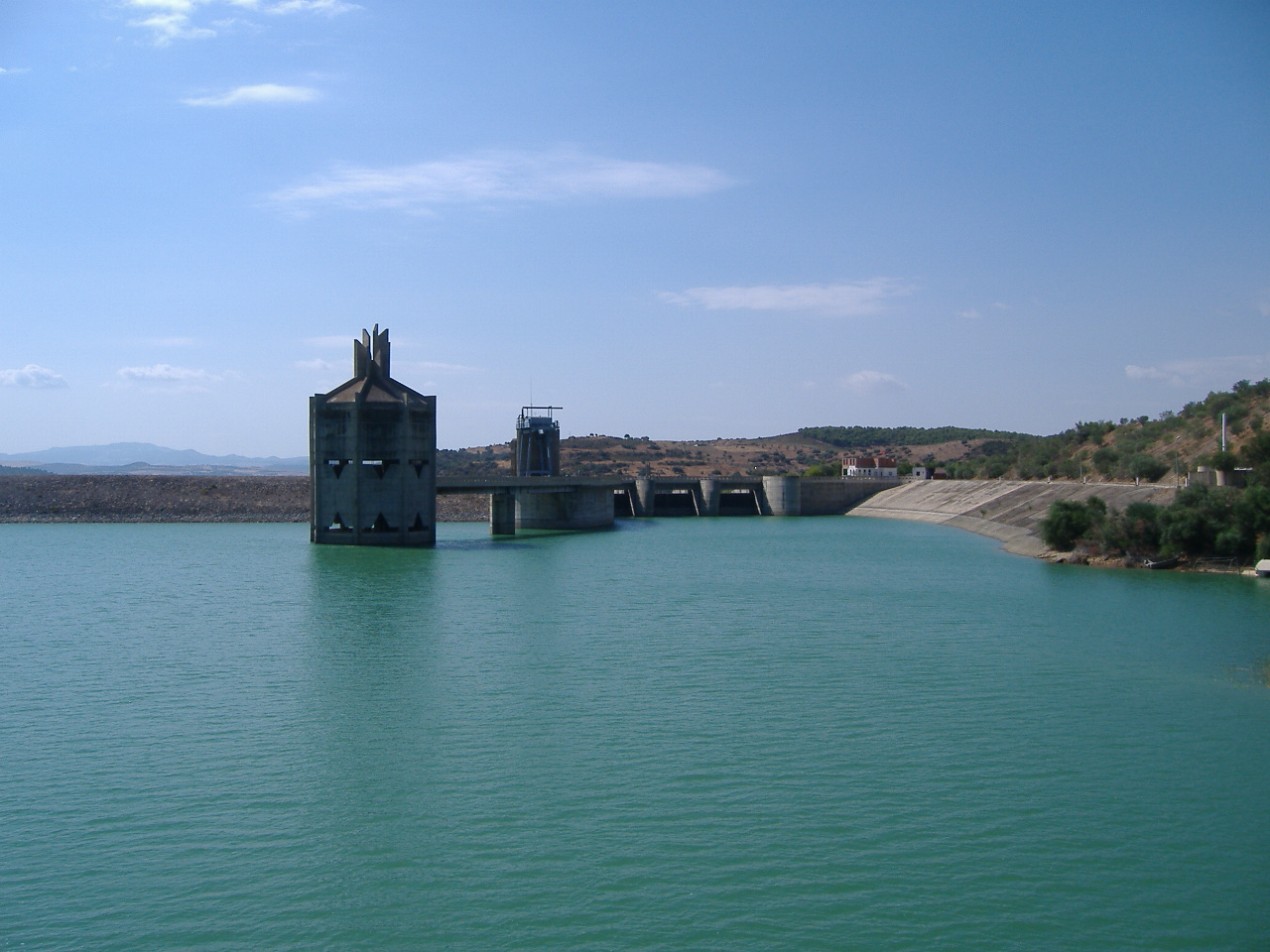

- Location within Tunisia
- Official name: Barrage Sidi Salem
- Country: Tunisia
- Location: Testour
- Coordinates: 36°35′26″N 9°23′49″E
- Status: Operational
- Construction began: 1977
- Opening date: 1981

Dam and spillways
- Type of dam: Embankment
- Impounds: Medjerda River
- Height: 73 m (240 ft)
- Length: 345 m (1,132 ft)
- Width (crest): 9.5 m (31 ft)
- Dam volume: 4,500,000 m^{3} (160,000,000 cu ft)
- Spillway capacity: 4,300 m^{3}/s (150,000 cu ft/s)

Reservoir
- Total capacity: 650×10^{6} m^{3} (526,964 acre⋅ft)

Power Station
- Hydraulic head: 75 m (246 ft) avg.
- Installed capacity: 12 MW (16,000 hp)

The Sidi Salem Dam is the largest embankment dam in Tunisia located 6 kilometres (3.7 mi) northwest of Testour on the Medjerda River in Béja Governorate, Tunisia. Constructed between 1977 and 1981, the dams supplies water for irrigation and supports a 12 megawatts (16,000 hp) power station.
