= Ras Ajdir =

Ras Ajdir راس اجدير
- Town
- Location in Libya Ras Ajdir (Tunisia) Ras Ajdir (Africa)
- Coordinates: 33.1481°N 11.5663°E
- Country: Libya Tunisia
- Time zone: UTC+2 (EET)

Ras Ajdir, alternatively Ras Jdir or Ras Ejder (Arabic: راس اجدير), is a small coastal town in far eastern Tunisia and is situated on the eastern border with Libya.

== Science ==
It is the site of an experimental station for wind and solar power generation for desalination.

== Transport ==
The town is a major transport hub and border crossing, for trade by road between Tunisia and Libya. From 15 February – 15 March 2007, 21,758 foreigners entered and 8,112 left through Ras Ajdir.

Ras Ajdir is a likely border station on the new Libyan Railways line, which is under construction in 2007. An agreement has been signed for a link to Tunisian Railways. The nearest Tunisian railhead, albeit of 1,000 mm (3 ft 3 3/8 in) gauge, is at Gabès.

== Libyan civil war ==
In 2011, during the Libyan Civil War, rebel forces attempted to take control of the crossing from loyalist forces. On 27 August, the border town was secured by the National Transitional Council forces.

== Demographics ==
As of 2019, the population of the small coastal town of Ra's Ajdir is 6,469 people consisting of 6,023 Libyans, 306 Tunisians, 87 Algerians, 31 Italians, 9 Chadians, 7 Egyptians, and 6 Maltese.

== See also ==
- Railway stations in Tunisia
