= Medjerda River =

Medjerda
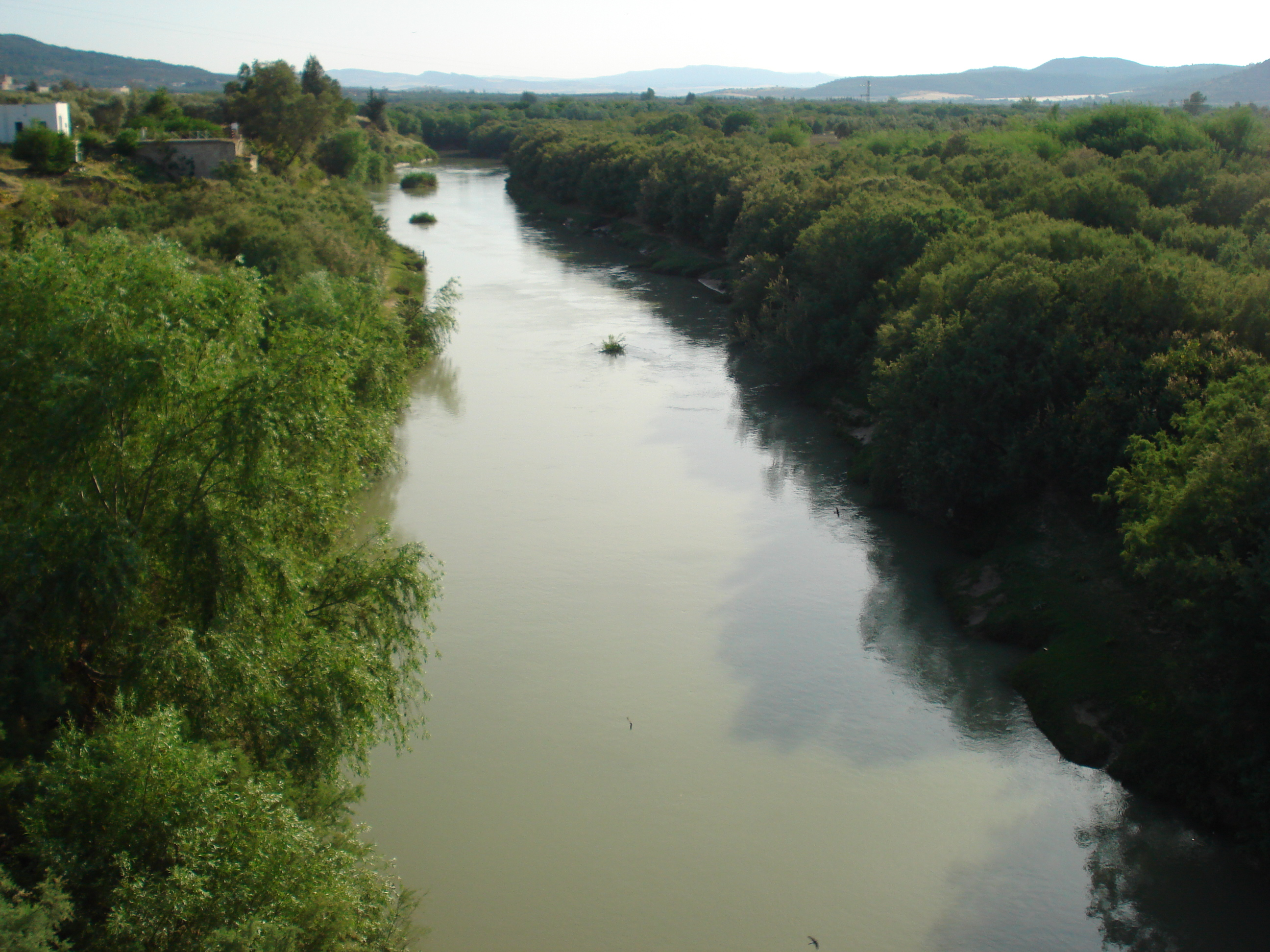
- The Medjerda River

- Medjerda river drainage basin (Map in French)
- Native name: واد مجردة (Arabic)

Location
- Countries: Algeria and Tunisia

Physical characteristics
- Source
  - location: Tell Atlas, Algeria
- Mouth
  - location: Gulf of Tunis, Mediterranean Sea
  - coordinates: 37°6′42″N 10°12′47″E
- Length: 460 km (290 mi)
- Basin size: 22,000 km^{2} (8,500 mi^{2})
- Discharge
  - average: 29 m^{3}/s (1,000 cu ft/s)

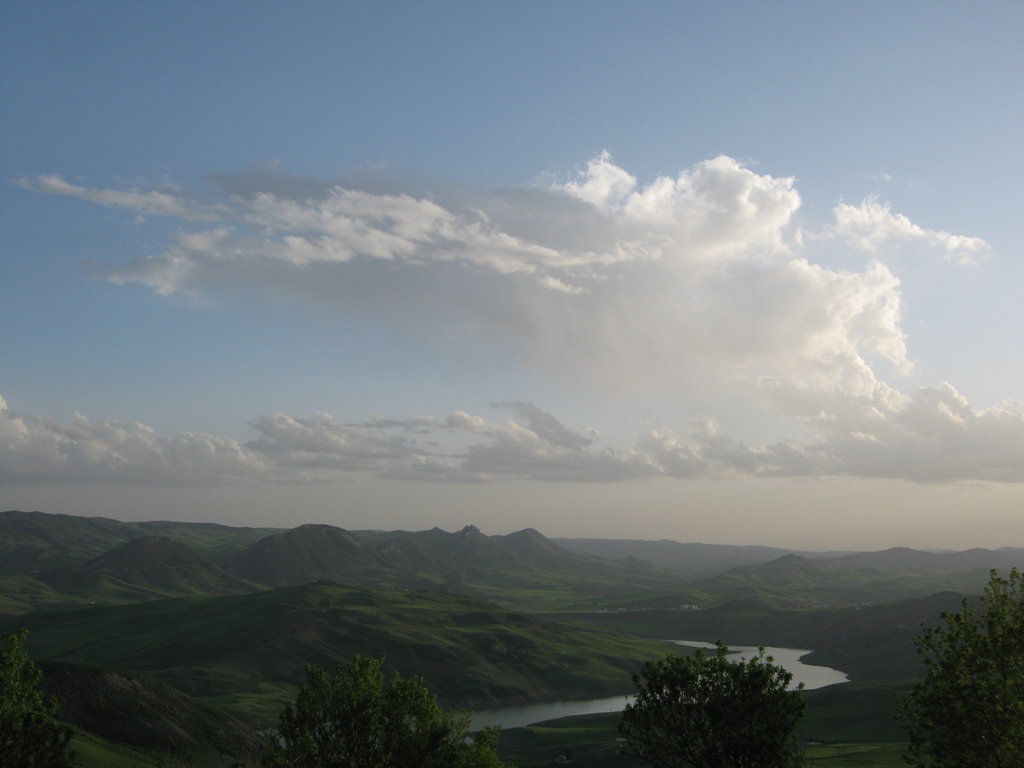
a view of the river

The Medjerda River (Arabic: وادي مجردة), the classical Bagradas, is a river in North Africa flowing from northeast Algeria through Tunisia before emptying into the Gulf of Tunis. With a length of 450 km (280 mi), it is the longest river of Tunisia. It is also known as the Wadi Majardah or Mejerda (French: Oued Majardah).

== Course ==
The Medjerda River originates in the Tell Atlas, part of the Atlas Mountains, in northeastern Algeria and then flows eastwards to Tunisia, then entering the Gulf of Utica of the Mediterranean Sea. Its course has a length of 460 kilometres (290 mi). It is the most important and longest river in Tunisia and is dammed in several locations, being a major supplier of water to the country's wheat crops.

The Gulf of Utica was formed during the postglacial transgression about 6,000 years ago. Over time, fluvial deposits from the Medjerda gradually filled up the northern part of the gulf. The succession of events during historical times has been inferred from ancient documents and archaeological evidence.

Besides morphological ground observations, aerial and satellite photographs have been used to analyze how the landscape has evolved over the past 3,000 years. The gulf's southern part was filled up in late ancient times. The sea gradually withdrew from the northern part during the Middle Ages and modern times. The Ghar el Melh lagoon is the last vestige of what used to be the Utica gulf.

Following the last big flood in 1973, the Medjerda shifted, once again, its course. It now flows through a canal originally dug to evacuate the overflow of flood waters.

== History ==
Historically the Medjerda is Tunisia's crucial waterway providing fresh water to the country’s population centers. It is also vital to the people living near the river. Water from the Medjerda is used for irrigation and is pivotal to the region's agriculture.

A strategic resource, it was fought over and settled many times by the Carthaginians, Romans, Vandals, Byzantines, Arabs, and the Ottomans. Several major cities were founded on or near it, including Utica, Carthage, and eventually Tunis. The former ports of Utica and Ghar el-Melh (Rusucmona or Porto Farina) were eventually closed by the silting of their harbors.

== See also ==
- Sidi Salem Dam
