= Transport in Tunisia =

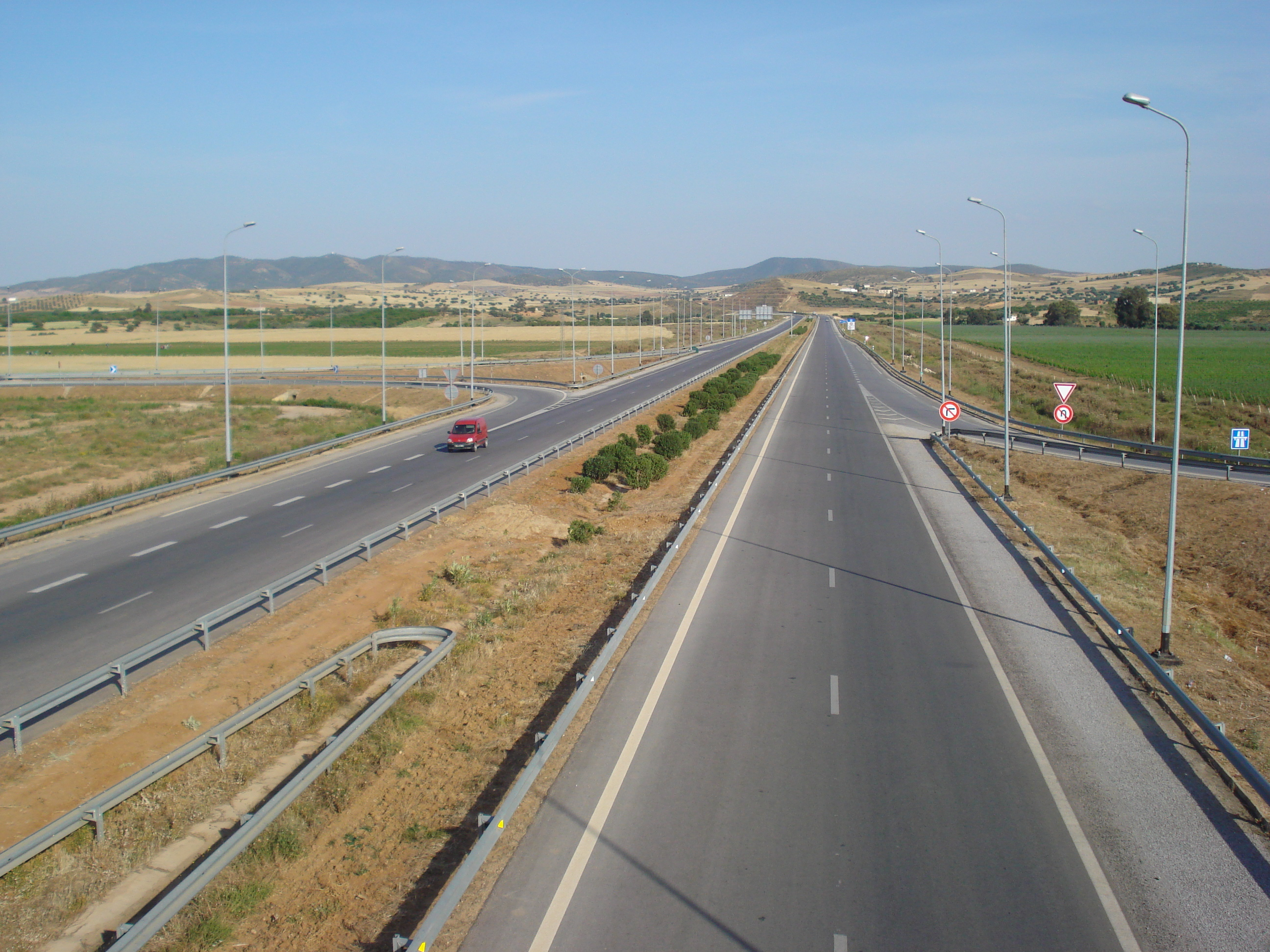
Autoroute A4 on (May 2008)

Tunisia has a number of international airports to service its sizable tourist trade. Tunis is the center of the transport system as the largest city having the largest port and a light transit system.

== Railways ==
Tunisian rail network

Tunisia inherited much of its rail transport system from the French. The Tunisian Government has developed infrastructure further. The railways are operated by the Société Nationale de Chemins de Fer Tunisiens (SNCFT), the Tunisian national railway. A modernisation program is currently underway. It has a total of 2,152 km consisting of 468 km of 1,435 mm (4 ft 8 1/2 in) standard gauge railways and 1,674 kilometres of 1,000 mm (3 ft 3 3/8 in) metre gauge. Tunis has a light rail system. In the south of Tunisia, there is a narrow gauge railway called the Sfax-Gafsa Railway which delivers phosphates and iron ore to the harbour at Sfax. Tunisia has rail links with the neighbouring country of Algeria via the Ghardimaou-Souk Ahras line, and another connection to Tébessa, however, the latter link is currently not used. There are no railways yet in neighbouring Libya though some are under construction in 2008; some gauge conversion would be required for efficient connections.

=== Railway links to adjacent countries ===
- Libya – railways under construction
- Algeria – yes – same gauge – 1,435 mm (4 ft 8 1/2 in)
- TGM
- Lézard rouge, a tourist train
- Métro léger de Tunis
- Réseau Ferroviaire Rapide

== Highways ==
Current extent of Highways in Tunisia

As of 2004, there were 18,997 km of highway including 12,310 of paved road and 6,387 of unpaved road. The major cities are all linked by road through the interior. In 2002, Tunisia borrowed €300 million from the European Investment Bank in 2002 to be used to improve roads in the country including €120 million towards building a motorway between Tunis and Sfax. (MEED Middle East Economic Digest, 15 Feb 2002 v46 i7(1))

=== Motorways ===
- A1 motorway
- A2 motorway (Under Construction) from Tunis to Jilma 186 km First phase, then Jilma to Gafsa 200 km in final phase.
- A3 motorway
- A4 motorway

=== International highways ===
Route 1 in the Trans-African Highway network passes through Tunisia, linking it to North African nations including Algeria, Morocco, Libya and Egypt, and to West African nations via Mauritania. In addition a feeder road links Tunisia to the Trans-Sahara Highway from Algeria to West Africa.

== Pipelines ==
Tunisia has an extensive pipeline network including 3,059 km of gas pipelines, 1,203 kilometres of oil pipeline and 345 km of refined products. Petrochemicals are Tunisia's third most important export despite the small size of its oil and gas fields as compared to Libya and Algeria. It also gets a royalty rate of 5 per cent on the Algerian gas that runs through Tunis to Sicily through the Trans-Mediterranean gas pipeline. (IPR Strategic Business Information Database, 18 Dec 2003) Libya's National Oil Corporation formed a joint venture with Societe Tunisienne de l'Electricite et du Gaz to construct a national gas pipeline between the two countries. (Petroleum Economist, Dec 2003 v70 i12 p43(1))

== Ports and harbours ==
Tunis is the most significant port in Tunisia with other significant ports on the Mediterranean Sea including Bizerte, Gabès, La Goulette, Sfax, Sousse and Zarzis. Tunisia's merchant marine consisted of 14 ships as at 2002.

== Aviation ==
As of 2002, Tunisia had 30 airports including several international airports. The most important one is the Tunis-Carthage International Airport but other significant airports serve Sfax, Djerba-Zarzis, Enfidha, Monastir, Tozeur and Tabarka. Tunisair is the national airline.
