= Asclepiodotus =

Asclepiodotus may refer to:

- Asclepiodotus of Heraclea (fl. 2nd century BC), commander in the Macedonian army during the Third Macedonian War
- Asclepiodotus (philosopher) (fl. 1st century BC), philosopher, writer, and pupil of Posidonius
- Asclepiodotus of Lesbos (fl. 1st century BC), conspirator against Mithridates VI of Pontus
- Cassius Asclepiodotus (fl. 1st century AD), wealthy Bithynian exiled by Nero
- Julius Asclepiodotus (fl. 3rd century AD), Roman prefect and consul who served under Aurelian, Probus and Diocletian
  - King Asclepiodotus, legendary British king based on Julius Asclepiodotus
- Asclepiodotus (consul 423)
- Asclepiodotus of Alexandria (fl. 5th century AD), Greek Neoplatonist philosopher
- Asclepiodotus (physician) (fl. 5th century AD), Greek physician
