= Cassia gens =

Ancient Roman family

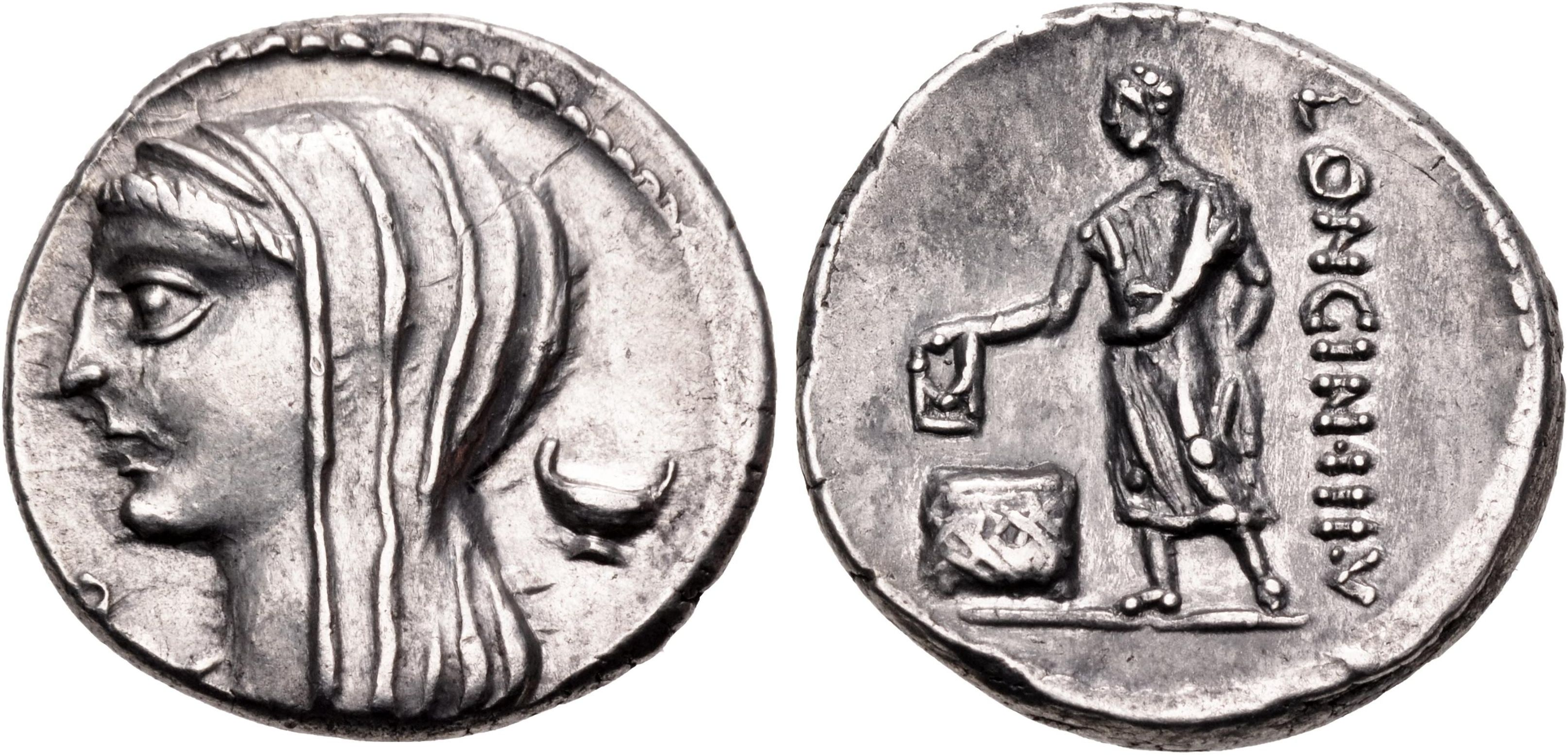
Denarius of Lucius Cassius Longinus, 63 BC. The obverse depicts Vesta. On the reverse, a voter is casting a ballot inscribed V, for uti rogas ("as you propose"). Vesta and the voter are allusions to the election of Longinus Ravilla as prosecutor in the Vestals' scandal of 113.

The gens Cassia was a Roman family of great antiquity. The earliest members of this gens appearing in history may have been patrician, but all those appearing in later times were plebeians. The first of the Cassii to obtain the consulship was Spurius Cassius Vecellinus, in 502 BC. He proposed the first agrarian law, for which he was charged with aspiring to make himself king, and put to death by the patrician nobility. The Cassii were amongst the most prominent families of the later Republic, and they frequently held high office, lasting well into imperial times. Among their namesakes are the Via Cassia, the road to Arretium, and the village of Cassianum Hirpinum, originally an estate belonging to one of this family in the country of the Hirpini.

Their most famous member is Gaius Cassius Longinus, an assassin of Julius Caesar alongside Brutus.

== Origin ==
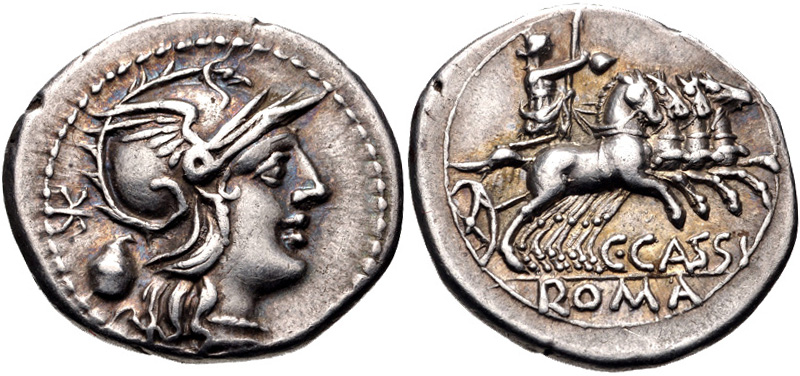
Denarius of Gaius Cassius Longinus, 126 BC. Roma is depicted on the obverse, with a voting urn behind. The reverse shows Libertas holding a pileus and driving a chariot. Both the urn and Libertas refer to the Lex Tabellaria passed by his uncle Longinus Ravilla as tribune of the plebs in 137.

A possible clue to the origin of the Cassii is the cognomen Viscellinus or Vecellinus, borne by the first of this gens to appear in history. It appears to be derived from the town of Viscellium or Vescellium, a settlement of the Hirpini, which is mentioned by Titus Livius in connection with the Second Punic War. The town was one of three captured by the praetor Marcus Valerius Laevinus after they had revolted in 215 BC. Its inhabitants, the Viscellani, are also mentioned by Pliny the Elder. This suggests the possibility that the ancestors of the Cassii were from Hirpinum, or had some other connection with Viscellium. The existence of a substantial estate of the Cassii in Hirpinum at a later time further supports such a connection.

Spurius Cassius Vecellinus, thrice consul at the beginning of the Republic, has traditionally been regarded as a patrician, in part because all of the consuls before 366 BC were supposed to have been patricians. The previous year saw the passage of the lex Licinia Sextia, formally permitting the plebeians to stand for the consulship. However, scholars have long suspected that a number of consuls bearing traditionally plebeian names during the nearly century and a half before this law were in fact plebeians, and that the original intent of the lex Licinia Sextia was not to open the consulship to the plebeians, but to require the election of a plebeian consul each year, although this was not permanently achieved for a number of years after its passage. Viscellinus may thus have been a plebeian, who made enemies of the patricians through his efforts at agrarian reform, and his proposed treaty with Rome's allies during his last consulship.

However, this point cannot be definitely settled. Many patrician families had plebeian branches, and it was common for families to vanish into obscurity for decades or even centuries, before returning to prominence in the Roman state. Patricians could also be expelled from their order, or voluntarily go over to the plebeians; but few examples are known. It may be that the sons of Viscellinus were expelled from the patriciate in lieu of being executed, or that they chose to pass over to the plebeians following their father's betrayal and murder.

From the imagery on their coins, it appears that the Cassii had a special devotion to the Aventine Triad of Ceres, Liber, and Libera, for whom Spurius Cassius Vecellinus built a temple on the Aventine Hill in 494. Libertas, a goddess associated with Liber and Libera, also features regularly on their coins. She was later the emblem of the Liberatores during the Civil War led by Gaius Cassius Longinus and Brutus against Octavian and Mark Antony.

== Praenomina ==
The principal names of the Cassii during the Republic were Lucius, Gaius, and Quintus. The praenomen Spurius is known only from Spurius Cassius Vecellinus, at the very beginning of the Republic, while Marcus appears in the first century BC.

== Branches and cognomina ==
The chief family of the Cassii in the time of the Republic bears the name of Longinus. The other cognomina during this time are Parmensis, Sabaco, Varus, and Viscellinus. One of the earliest Roman historians was Lucius Cassius Hemina, whose cognomen—unique in Roman history—comes from hemina, a unit of measure of about half a pint, or a quarter litre, perhaps an allusion to his short stature. A number of other surnames are found from the final century of the Republic onwards. The famous censor Lucius Cassius Longinus also used the agnomen Ravilla. A single Caecianus is known; his cognomen shows that he or an ancestor was adopted from the gens Caecia. He might have been related to the Longini as he pictured Ceres on the coins he minted.

== Members ==
This list includes abbreviated praenomina. For an explanation of this practice, see filiation.

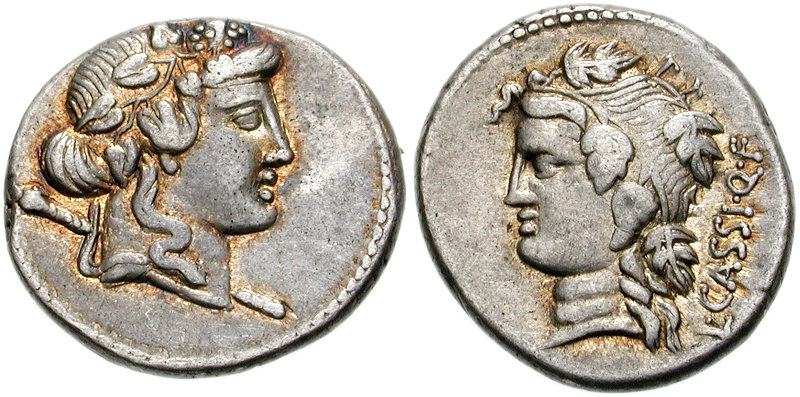
Denarius of Lucius Cassius Longinus, 78 BC. Liber is depicted on the obverse, Libera on the reverse. They allude to the Temple of Ceres, Liber and Libera built by Spurius Cassius Vecellinus, and to the Lex Tabellaria of 137.

=== Early Cassii ===
- Spurius Cassius Vecellinus, consul in 502, 493, and 486 BC, and the first magister equitum in 501; put to death by the patricians after proposing the first agrarian law during his third consulship.
- Cassii Viscellini, three sons of the consul Viscellinus, whose praenomina are unknown, were spared by the senate after the murder of their father. They or their descendants may have been expelled by the patricians from their order, or have voluntarily passed over to the plebeians.

=== Cassii Longini ===
- Quintus Cassius (Longinus?), military tribune in 252 BC, during the First Punic War. He was deprived of his command following a severe defeat, after engaging the enemy against the orders of the consul, Gaius Aurelius Cotta.
- Lucius Cassius Q. f. Longinus, father of Quintus, consul in 164 BC, and possibly son of Quintus, the military tribune.
- Gaius Cassius Longinus, grandfather of Gaius Cassius Longinus, the consul of 171 BC.
- Gaius Cassius C. f. Longinus, the father of Gaius Cassius Longinus.
- Gaius Cassius C. f. C. n. Longinus, consul in 171 and censor in 154 BC.
- Quintus Cassius L. f. Q. n. Longinus, praetor in 167 BC, and consul in 164, died during his consulship.
- Lucius Cassius C. f. C. n. Longinus Ravilla, the elder son of the consul of 171, as tribune of the plebs in 137, he passed the third Lex Tabellaria. He was then consul in 127, and censor in 125 BC. In 113 he was elected special prosecutor to investigate an incest scandal among the Vestal Virgins; he sentenced to death two of them that had been acquitted the previous year.
- Gaius Cassius C. f. C. n. Longinus, consul in 124 BC; the younger son of the consul of 171.
- Lucius Cassius Q. f. L. n. Longinus, son of the consul of 164 BC.
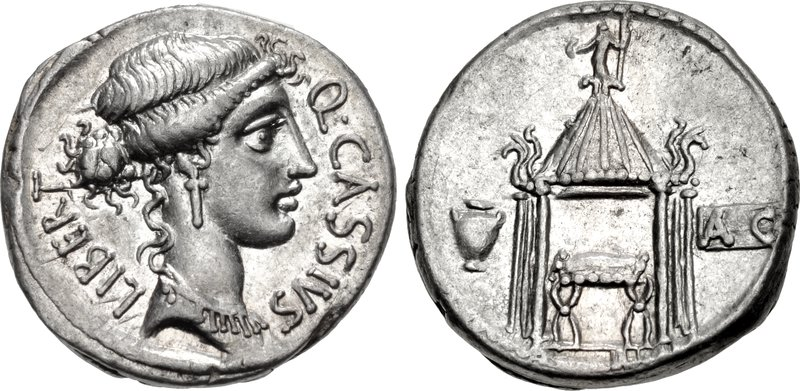
  Denarius of Quintus Cassius Longinus, 55 BC. Libertas is portrayed on the obverse. The reverse is a depiction of the Temple of Vesta, where Longinus Ravilla held his trial of the vestals in 113. On the left is a voting urn, and a ballot (tabella) is on the right. It is inscribed A C for Absolvo Condemno ("acquitted" or "condemned"), a further reference to the trial.
- Gaius Cassius C. f. C. n. Longinus, son of the consul of 124 BC, triumvir monetalis in 126. (Note: Sumner thought that the moneyer was also the consul of 124 BC, but according to Crawford, he would have already been too old in 127.)
- Lucius Cassius L. f. C. n. Longinus, praetor in 111 BC, consul in 107, slain by the Tigurini at the Battle of Burdigala. He was probably the first son of Ravilla.
- Gaius Cassius L. f. (C. n.) Longinus, praetor in 99 BC, consul in 96. He was probably the second son of Ravilla.
- Lucius Cassius L. f. L. n. Longinus, tribune of the plebs in 104 BC.
- Quintus Cassius L. f. L. n. Longinus, younger brother of the tribune of 104 BC.
- Lucius Cassius (L. f. L. n. Longinus), as tribune of the plebs in 89 BC, roused a mob of creditors to lynch the praetor Aulus Sempronius Asellio. Sumner makes him one of the Longini, and the first son of Lucius, the consul of 107.
- Gaius Cassius L. f. L. n. Longinus, triumvir monetalis in 84 BC, consul in 73. He was the second son of the consul of 107.
- Quintus Cassius L. f. L. n. Longinus, third son of the consul of 107.
- Lucius Cassius Q. f. (L. n.) Longinus, triumvir monetalis in 78 BC, military tribune in 69, and praetor in 66. He was an unsuccessful candidate for the consulship in 63, and afterward one of Catiline's conspirators. (Note: Sumner suggested that L. Cassius, military tribune in 69, was a son of Gaius, consul in 96, but Broughton later identified him with L. Longinus, praetor in 66. Broughton was also less certain than Crawford and Sumner that the praetor should be identified with L. Cassius Q. f., monetalis in 78.)
- Gaius Cassius C. f. L. n. Longinus, the tyrannicide, quaestor in Syria under Crassus, he survived the disaster of Carrhae. He was then tribune of the plebs in 49, and praetor peregrinus in 44. He was the elder son of the consul of 73.
- Lucius Cassius C. f. L. n. Longinus, triumvir monetalis in 63 BC, proconsul in 48, tribunus plebis in 44. He was brother of the tyrannicide.
- Quintus Cassius Q. f. L. n. Longinus, triumvir monetalis in 55 BC, quaestor in 52, tribune of the plebs in 49, and propraetor of Hispania Ulterior in 48 during the Civil War.
- Gaius Cassius C. f. C. n. Longinus, son of the tyrannicide, received the toga virilis just before the murder of Caesar.
- Lucius Cassius L. f. C. n. Longinus, left by his uncle, Gaius, as governor of Syria in 43 BC, fell at the Battle of Philippi.
- Quintus Cassius (Longinus?), legate of Quintus Cassius Longinus in Hispania in 48 BC. He was praetor in 44, and Marcus Antonius sent him to Hispania again at the end of 44. (Note: It is unknown whether he was one of the Longini, neither Broughton nor Sumner gives his family connections with the other Cassii.)
- Lucius Cassius L. f. L. n. Longinus, consul in AD 11, was probably the father of Lucius and Gaius Cassius Longinus, consuls in AD 30.
- Lucius Cassius (L. f. L. n.) Longinus, consul in AD 30, married Drusilla, the sister of Caligula.
- Gaius Cassius (L. f. L. n.) Longinus, a jurist, consul suffectus in AD 30; banished by Claudius, but afterward recalled by Vespasian.

=== Others ===
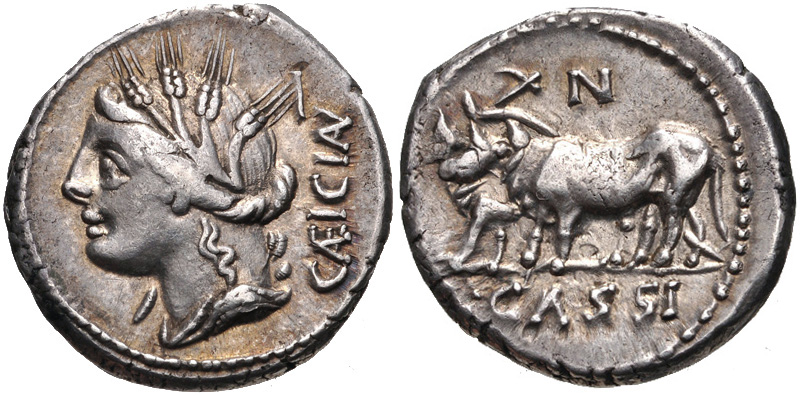
Denarius of Lucius Cassius Caecianus, 102 BC. On the obverse is Ceres, while the reverse shows a yoke of oxen, an allegory of agriculture.

- Lucius Cassius Hemina, a historian of the second century BC.
- Gaius Cassius, military tribune in 168 BC, entrusted by the praetor Lucius Anicius Gallus with the custody of the Illyrian king Gentius.
- Lucius Cassius Caecianus, triumvir monetalis in 102 BC.
- Gaius Cassius, praetor about 90 BC.
- Lucius Cassius, proconsul in Asia in 90 BC, captured the following year by Mithradates.
- Marcus Cassius M. f., a senator in 73 BC and possibly a praetor in an uncertain year before.
- Marcus Cassius Scaeva, a centurion in Caesar's army at the Battle of Dyrrhachium, and later one of Caesar's partisans.
- Cassius Dionysius, a native of Utica, and an agricultural writer, who translated the work of the Carthaginian Mago.
- Cassius Barba, a friend of Caesar, who gave Cicero guards for his villa, when Caesar paid him a visit in 44 BC.
- Cassius Etruscus, an author ridiculed by Quintus Horatius Flaccus, sometimes confused with Cassius Parmensis.
- Cassius Parmensis, tribunus militum in the army of Brutus and Cassius, put to death by Octavianus.
- Cassius Betillinus, mentioned by Cassius Dio, is apparently an error for Betilienus Bassus.
- Cassius Severus, a celebrated orator and satirical writer, in the time of Augustus and Tiberius.
- Gaius Cassius Chaerea, tribune of the Praetorian Guard under Caligula, against whom he conspired and whom he helped to assassinate, with the intent of restoring the Republic.
- Quintus Cassius Gratus, governor of Crete and Cyrenaica during the reign of Claudius.
- Cassius Asclepiodotus, a wealthy man of Bithynia, exiled by Nero, but subsequently restored by Galba.
- Cassius Felix, also called Cassius Iatrosophista, author of a medical treatise, Quaestiones Medicae et Problemata Naturalia.
- Publius Cassius Dexter, quaestor in 138.
- Avidius Cassius, a successful general under Marcus Aurelius, against whom he subsequently rebelled.
- Cassius Apronianus, governor of Dalmatia and Cilicia, father of the historian Cassius Dio.
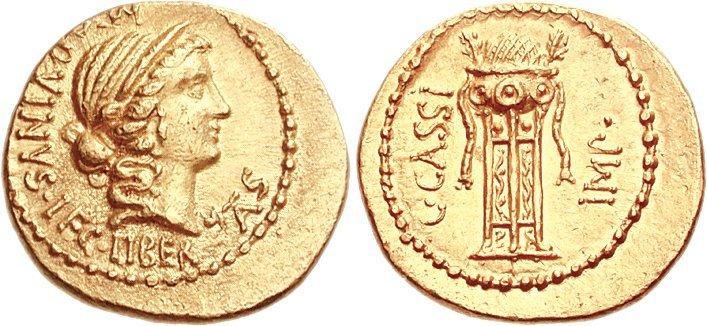
  Aureus of Gaius Cassius Longinus, the tyrannicide, 42 BC. The obverse features Libertas, patron goddess of the Cassii and the Liberatores. The tripod is a reference to his position of quindecimvir sacris faciundis.
- Cassius Clemens, brought to trial circa AD 195, for having espoused the side of Pescennius Niger, defended himself with such dignity that Septimius Severus granted him his life and allowed him to retain half his property.
- Lucius Cassius Dio, or Dion Cassius, a senator, was consul circa AD 205, and again in 229, as the colleague of the emperor Severus Alexander. He was the author of a monumental history of Rome.
- Cassius Dio, consul in AD 291, perhaps the grandson of the historian.

== See also ==
- List of Roman gentes

== Bibliography ==
- Marcus Tullius Cicero, Epistulae ad Atticum, In Catilinam, Philippicae, Pro Plancio, Pro Sulla.
- Gaius Sallustius Crispus (Sallust), Bellum Catilinae (The Conspiracy of Catiline).
- Aulus Hirtius, De Bello Alexandrino (On the Alexandrine War).
- Dionysius of Halicarnassus, Romaike Archaiologia (Roman Antiquities).
- Titus Livius (Livy), History of Rome.
- Marcus Velleius Paterculus, Compendium of Roman History.
- Quintus Asconius Pedianus, Commentarius in Oratio Ciceronis In Toga Candida (Commentary on Cicero's Oration In Toga Candida).
- Lucius Mestrius Plutarchus (Plutarch), Lives of the Noble Greeks and Romans.
- Appianus Alexandrinus (Appian), Bellum Civile (The Civil War).
- Cassius Dio, Roman History.
- Magnus Aurelius Cassiodorus Senator, Chronica.
- Joannes Zonaras, Epitome Historiarum (Epitome of History).
- Niebuhr, Barthold Georg (1828). The History of Rome. Translated by Hare, Julius Charles; Thirlwall, Connop. Cambridge: John Smith.
- Niebuhr, Barthold Georg (1849). Schmitz, Leonhard (ed.). Lectures on the History of Rome. London: Taylor, Walton, and Maberly.
- Smith, William, ed. (1849). Dictionary of Greek and Roman Biography and Mythology. Boston: Little, Brown and Company.
- Dittenberger, Wilhelm (1883). Sylloge Inscriptionum Graecarum. Leipzig.. Collection of Greek Inscriptions, abbreviated SIG.
- Broughton, T. Robert S. (1952–1986). The Magistrates of the Roman Republic. American Philological Association.
- Jones, A. H. M.; Martindale, J. R. (1971–1992). The Prosopography of the Later Roman Empire. Cambridge University Press.. Abbreviated PLRE.
- Sumner, Graham Vincent (1973). The Orators in Cicero's Brutus: Prosopography and Chronology. Phoenix Supplementary Volume XI. Toronto and Buffalo: University of Toronto Press..
- Crawford, Michael (2001) [1974]. Roman Republican Coinage. Cambridge University Press.
- Cornell, Timothy J. (1995). The Beginnings of Rome: Italy and Rome from the Bronze Age to the Punic Wars (c. 1000–264 BC). London: Routledge.
- Cornell, Tim, ed. (2013). The Fragments of the Roman Historians. Oxford University Press.
- August Pauly; Georg Wissowa; Wilhelm Kroll; Kurt Witte; Karl Mittelhaus; Konrat Ziegler, eds. (1894–1980). Paulys Realencyclopädie der classischen Altertumswissenschaft. Stuttgart: J. B. Metzler.
