= Utica National Museum =

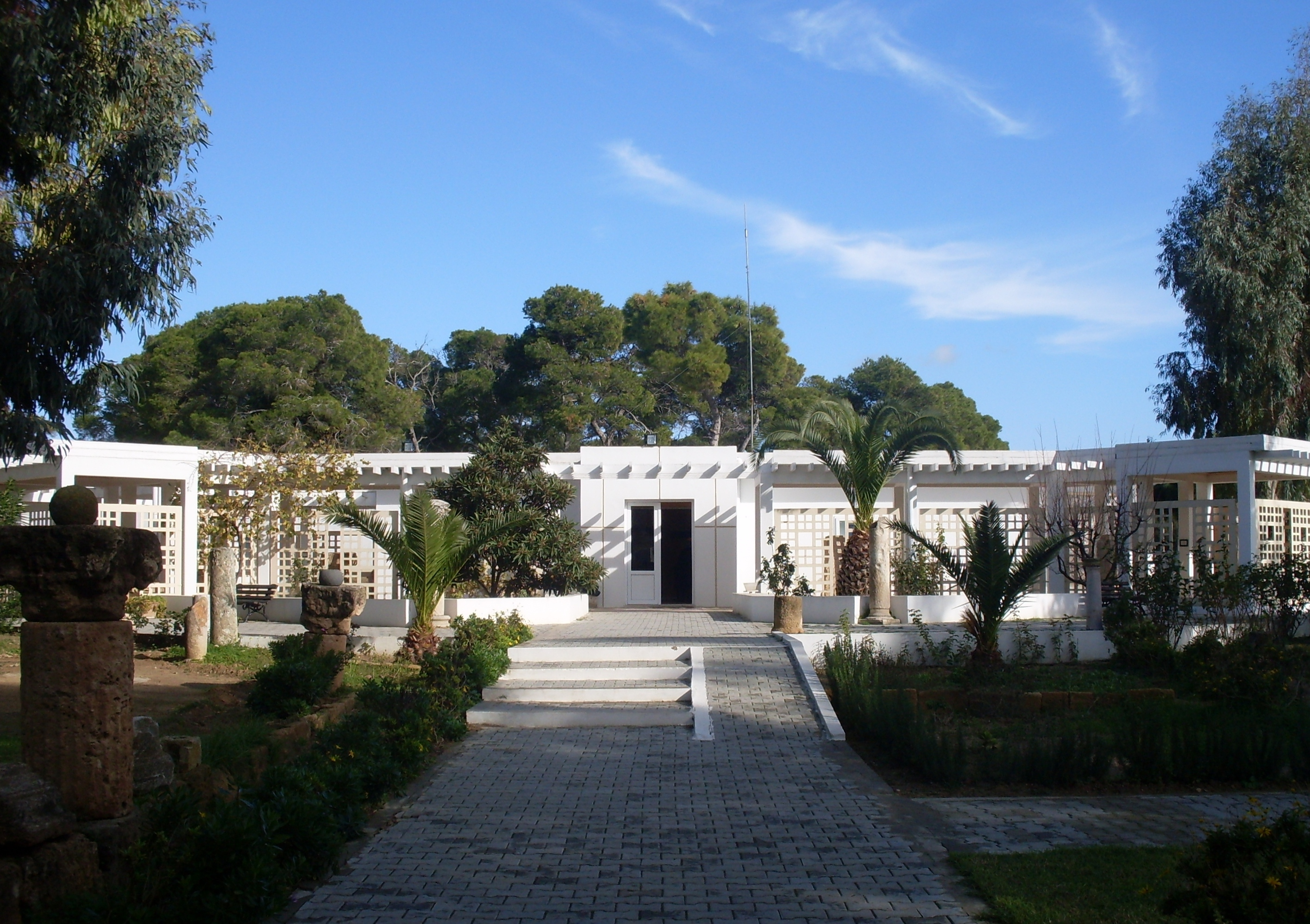
- Established: 1990
- Location: Utica, Tunisia
- Coordinates: 37.052075°N 10.058559°E
- Type: Archaeological Museum

The National Museum of Utica (French: Musée national d'Utique; Arabic: المتحف الوطني بأوتيك) is a museum dedicated to archeology in Tunisia located in Utica. The museum is dedicated to preserving important historical objects from the history of North African civilizations.

== History ==
Since the beginning of the 20th century, there were plans to create a museum in Utica. The museum had acquired different objects through various excavations. In 1990, the museum was established. In 2006, an outdoor gallery was built to display different sculptures. The museum housed artifacts discovered by M. Fendri's excavations, which were repatriated in 2003. In January 2010, the Bizerte National Guard reported the discovery of a necropolis following the looting of some graves by inhabitants of the village of Beni Nafa. The Guard informed the National Institute of Heritage, the guard seized several ceramics, which were then kept in the reserves of the museum. In 2014, four masks from the museum were exhibited in New York City. In 2015, 2019 people were reported to have visited the museum. In July 2017, the museum was added virtual tours with an adapted Google Street View version for interiors together other museums in Tunisia. In October 2017, a concert of classical music was organized with the participation of the Romanian artists Andreea Ciornenchi Grigoras and Bogdan Grigoras of the "Duo Violons".

== Collections ==
The museum is divided into two rooms, one for the Punic period and the other for the Roman period. The museum contains exhibits of mosaics, statues and ceramics. The museum also has jewelry exhibits. The museum contains objects from the Punic necropolis such as funerary furniture. The museum presents in its reserves Ionic capitals, which are classified into two types. In addition, the museum contains punic inspritions.

- Punic Room: In this room can be found vases and jars dating back to the 7th century BC, ancient bronze axes, Punic oil lamps, stelae and amphorae.
- Roman Room: In this room can be found a collection of mosaics and inscriptions, as well as statues. Among the collection of statues, they include statues of Hercules, Aesculapius, Satyr and Ariadne.

== Gallery ==
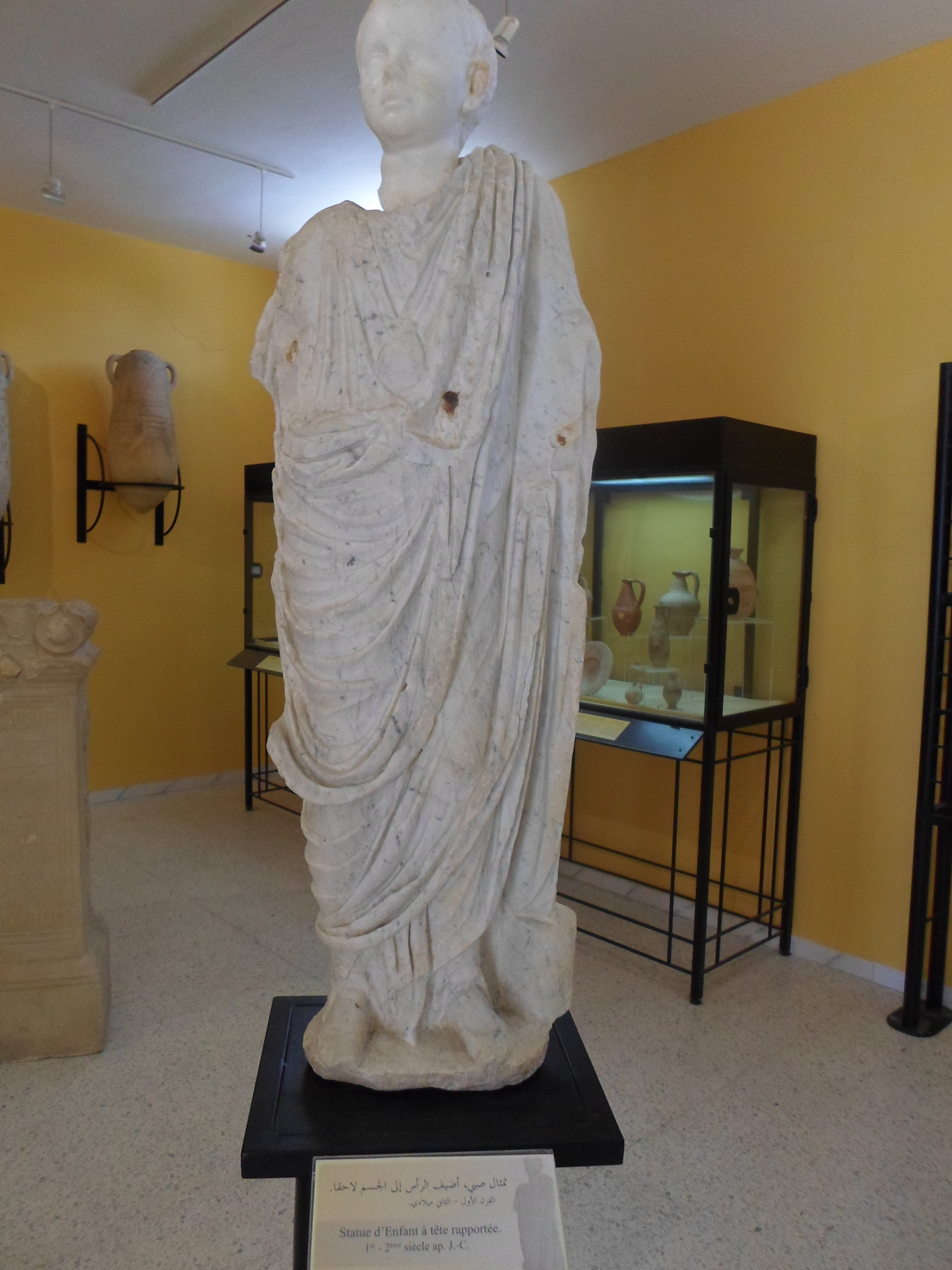
Statue

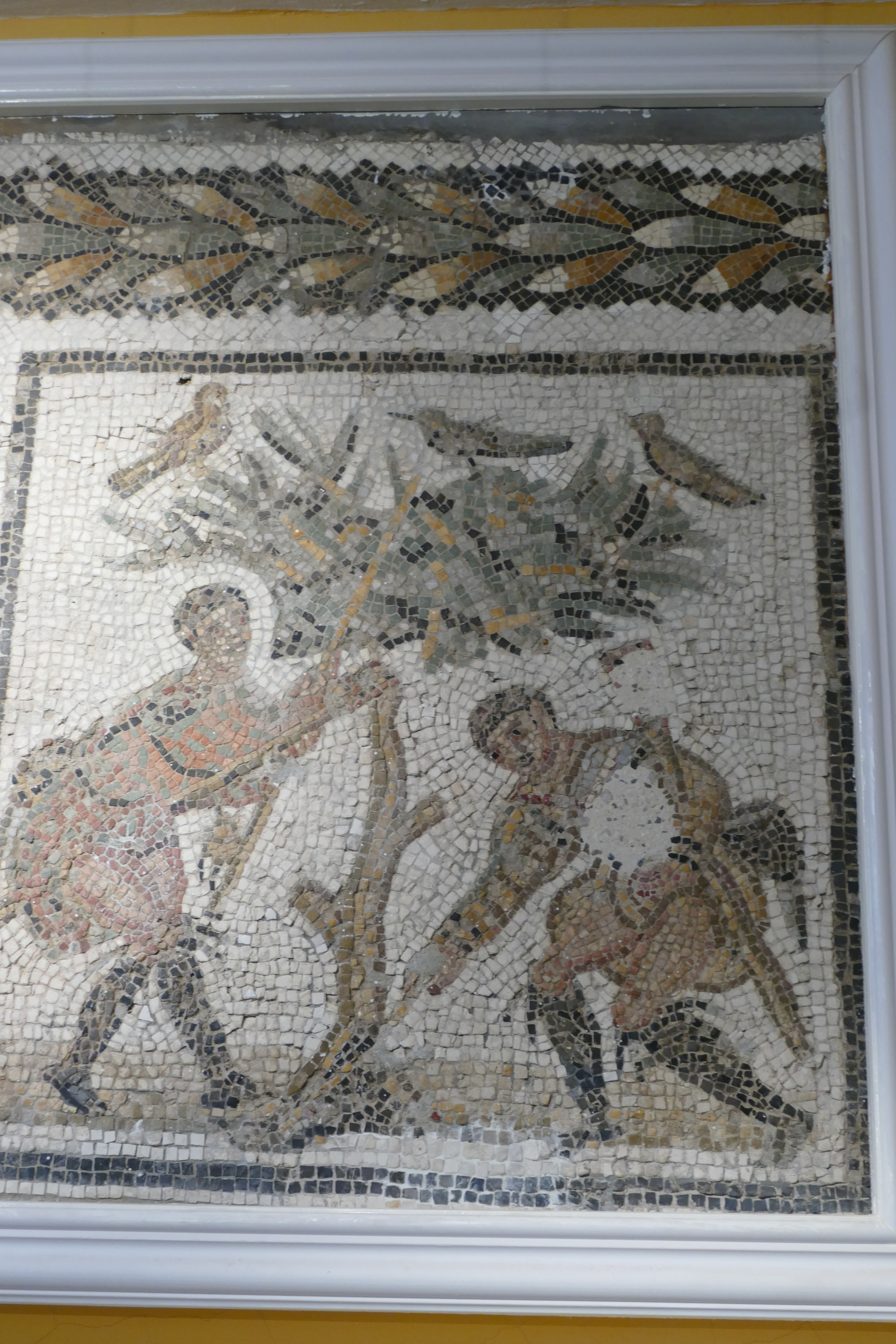
Mosaic

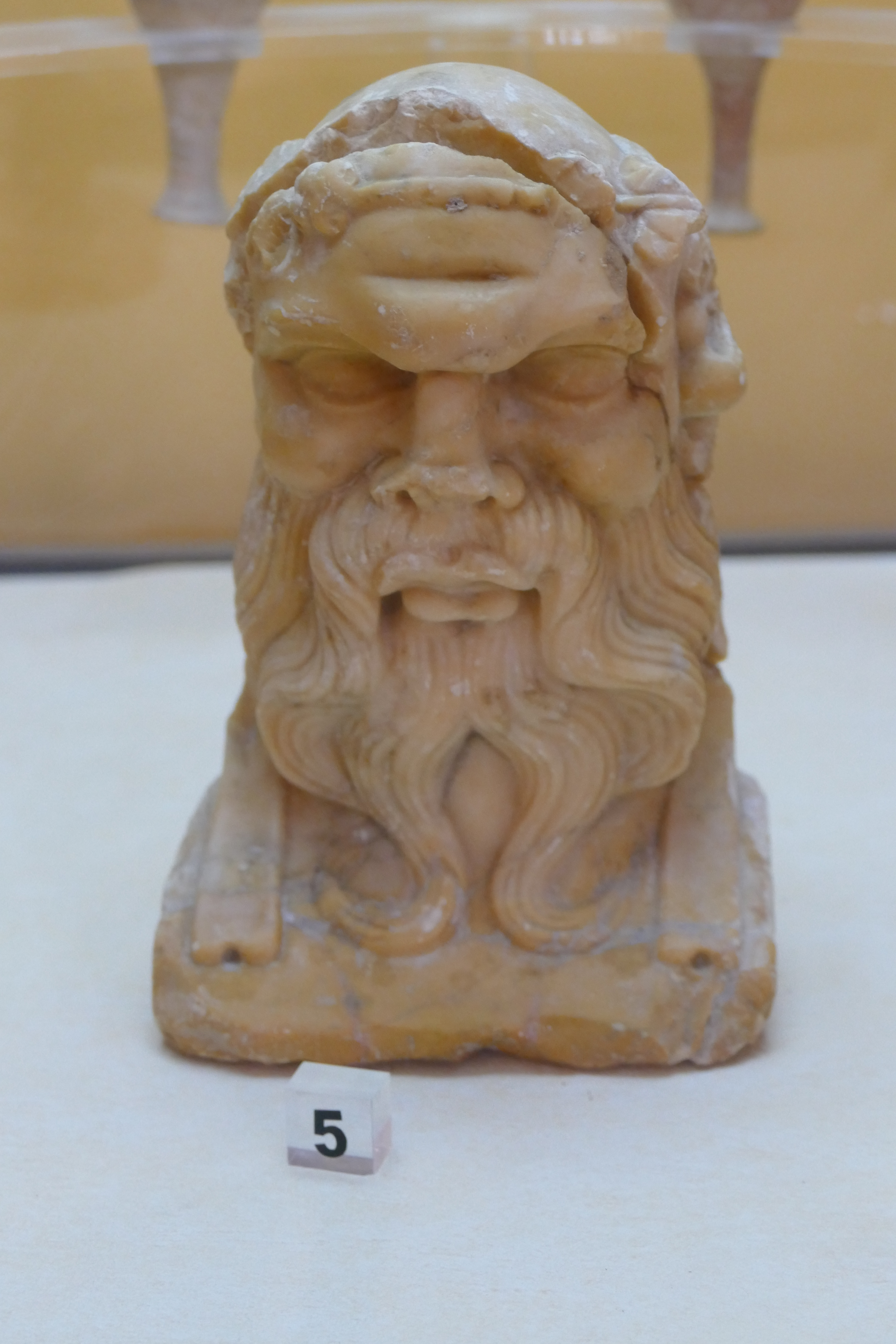
Sculpture

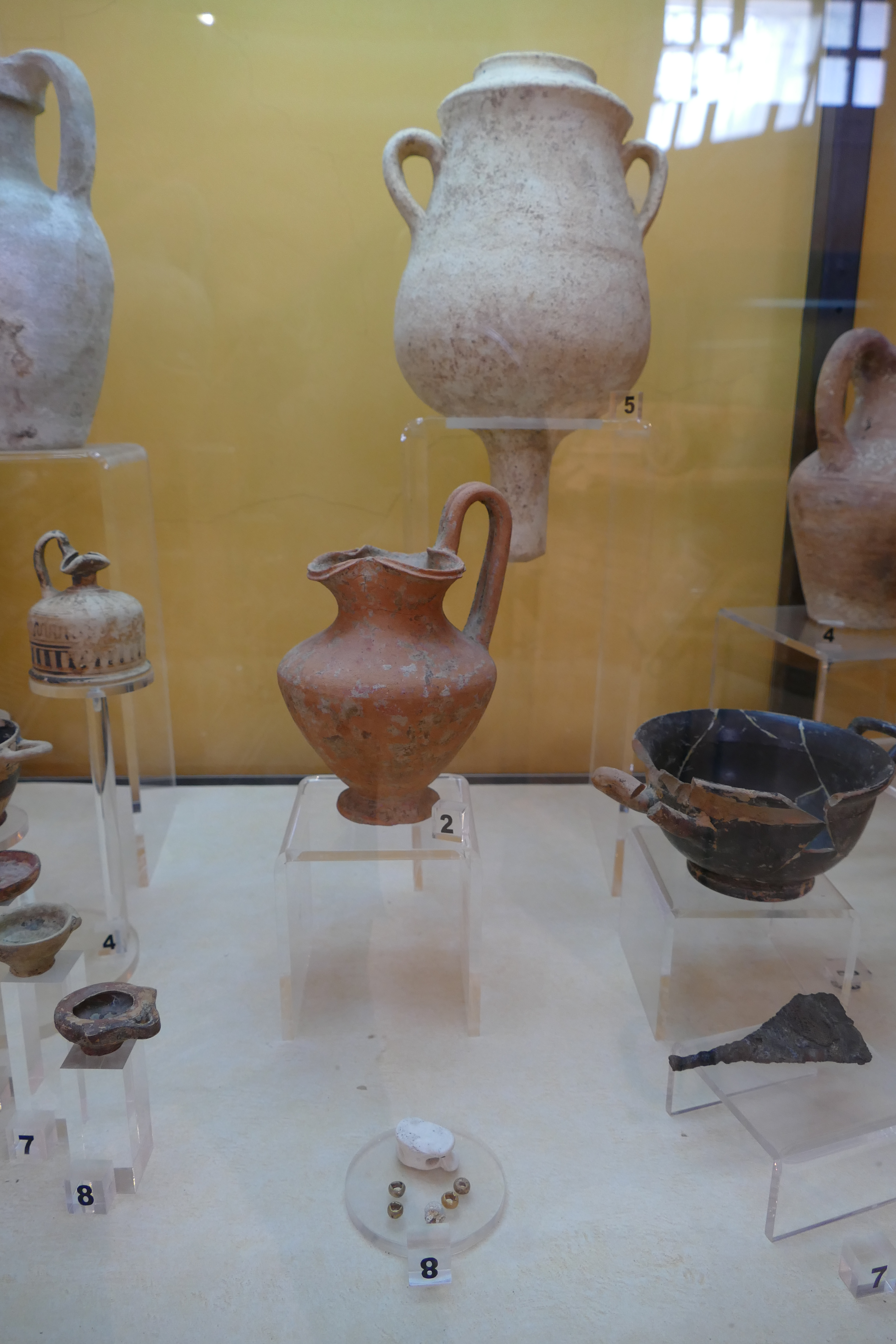
Ceramics
