= Gaius Cassius Parmensis =

1st-century BC Roman politician and writer

Gaius Cassius Parmensis (born c. 74 BC; died 31 or 30 BC in Athens) was a Roman politician and a Latin writer of the late Roman Republic. He was the last surviving of the conspirators against Gaius Julius Caesar.

== Family origins and philosophy ==
Cassius Parmensis came from that branch of the Roman gens Cassia, that played an important role in the founding of the city of Parma on the Via Aemilia in the second century BC. The ancient commentaries of Horace note that he was a follower of the teachings of Epicurus.

== Murder of Julius Caesar and aftermath ==
In the spring of 44 BC Cassius Parmensis participated in the assassination of Caesar by members of the Senate. In 43 BC, following the murder, he became a quaestor and built a fleet which supported Gaius Cassius Longinus against Publius Cornelius Dolabella off the coast of the province of Asia. At the same time he wrote a report to Cicero from Cyprus on the situation, which has been handed down in the latter's correspondence.

In November of 43 Cassius Parmensis, like many other enemies of Caesar, was declared an outlaw (proscribed) by the triumvirate of Mark Antony, Octavian, and Lepidus. After the defeat of the party of the murderers of Caesar in the Battle of Philippi (autumn of 42 BC), he gathered the remaining military units and was able to bring himself and the undamaged fleet to safety for a while with Sextus Pompeius in Sicily. After the latter's defeat in the year 36 BC, he accompanied the fallen "naval king" to Asia Minor, in order to join Antony during the final battles in Bithynia.

Antony and Octavian waged a propaganda attack with in part low blows and slanders which preceded the decisive military confrontation for autocratic rule in the Roman Empire. Cassius also took part with intense violent attacks against Caesar's heirs. He asserted that Octavian was of low descent, and was only named his heir due to a homosexual relationship with Caesar. Furthermore, he accused Octavian of wanting to make his only daughter Julia the consort of the rich but "barbarous" nobleman Koson of Dacia.

In 31 BC, Cassius Parmensis fought under Antony's command at the Battle of Actium. His flight from Octavian's revenge lasted a total of twelve years (which was longer than that of all the other conspirators) but after the fall of Antony he finally lost every possibility of fleeing, since the adopted son of Caesar now ruled the entire Roman Empire. After the defeat at Actium, he fled to Athens, where, in 30 B.C. at the very latest, he was recognized as the last surviving assassin of Caesar still living and was killed by Lucius Varus under Octavian's orders.

== Writings ==
Cassius Parmensis wrote tragedies, satires, elegies and epigrams, which, in Horace's opinion, were not insignificant; none of his work has survived. Only the titles of two tragedies are known, Thyestes and Brutus, the first of which was allegedly stolen by his murderer Varus. Thyestes was subsequently published as Varus's own work. The style of his letter to Cicero seems above all complicated and pedantic in its flatteries, but also demonstrates a good talent for military observation. As for the common assertion often referring to another location in Horace, that Cassius had been burned to death together with his works, it is probably a mix-up.

Marcus Terentius Varro quotes a verse of Cassius; however, the same verse is also attributed in another place to the poet Lucius Accius:

Nocte intempesta nostram devenit domum
[Late at night he came into our home]
