= Caecia gens =

The gens Caecia was an obscure plebeian family at ancient Rome, that flourished from the late Republic and into imperial times. None of the Caecii attained any of the higher offices of the Roman state, and the only member of this gens mentioned by Roman writers is Gaius Caecius, an acquaintance of Cicero. A number of Caecii are known from inscriptions.

== Origin ==
While the Caecii are barely mentioned in history, the nomen Caecius must have been of considerable antiquity, for the nomen Caecilius was evidently derived from it, using the diminutive or derivative suffix -ilius. Both are ultimately derived from the surname Caecus, a cognomen originally indicating someone who was blind. Chase classifies Caecius among those gentilicia that were either native to Rome, or are found there and cannot be shown to have come from anywhere else.

== Praenomina ==
The praenomen that occurs most frequently in the epigraphy of this family is Gaius, among the most common praenomina at all periods of Roman history. Other Caecii also used common names, such as Lucius, Marcus, Publius, and Quintus, and there are individual instances of Aulus, Titus, and Vibius.

== Members ==
This list includes abbreviated praenomina. For an explanation of this practice, see filiation.

- Caecius P. f., mentioned in a list of priests at Adria in Picenum, dating between the middle of the second and the late first century BC.
- Gaius Caecius, was given instructions for Cicero by the younger Publius Cornelius Lentulus Spinther in 49 BC.
- Quintus Caecius Ɔ. l. Dorcus, a freedman buried at Rome, in a tomb dating from the latter half of the first century BC, or the first half of the first century AD.
- Caecia Q. l. Heuticis or Heutycis, a freedwoman buried at Rome during the late first century BC or early first century AD.
- Caecia P. f., the wife of Lucius Latinius, and mother of Lucius Latinius Stabilius, who dedicated a tomb for his parents at Regium Lepidum in Cisalpine Gaul, dating from the early first century.
- Gaius Caecius C. l. Auctus, a freedman mentioned in an inscription from Rome, dating from the first half of the first century.
- Caecia Ɔ. l. Martia, a freedman named in a sepulchral inscription from Rome, dating from the first half of the first century.
- Caecia C. l. Eulimene, a freedwoman mentioned in a first-century inscription from Rome, along with Gaius Caecius Philaristus, and a friend, Decimus Cornelius Hilarus.
- Lucius Caecius L. L. f. Felix, together with Lucius Caecius Hermeros and Lucius Caecius Hilarus, one of three freedmen who became Augustales, named in a first-century sepulchral inscription from Beneventum in Samnium.
- Lucius Caecius L. L. f. Hermeros, together with Lucius Caecius Felix and Lucius Caecius Hilarus, one of three freedmen who became Augustales, named in a first-century sepulchral inscription from Beneventum.
- Lucius Caecius L. L. Hilarus, together with Lucius Caecius Felix and Lucius Caecius Hermeros, one of three freedmen who became Augustales, named in a first-century sepulchral inscription from Beneventum.
- Quintus Caecius Nico, the husband of Helvia Erotis, named in a first-century inscription from Rome.
- Gaius Caecius C. f. Philaristus, a freedman named in a first-century inscription from Rome, along with Caecia Eulimene, and a friend, Decimus Cornelius Hilarus.
- Gaius Caecius Pulcher, chief magistrate of Lanuvium in Latium in AD 42 or 43, early in the reign of Claudius.
- Gaius Caecius Natalis, together with his wife, Fortunata, dedicated a second-century tomb at Rome for their son, whose name has not been preserved.
- Marcus Caecius Tintinabelus, dedicated a tomb at Beneventum, dating from the second or early third century, for his wife, Herennia Urania.
- Caecia Montana, dedicated a tomb at Beneventum, dating between the middle of the second century and the early third, for Gaius Ofilius Modestus, her husband of seventeen years.
- Caecius Severus, an officer mentioned in a military diploma from Asia, dating to AD 139, and another from 140.
- Aulus Caecius Faustinus, a native of Puteoli in Campania, was a soldier in the second cohort of the Praetorian Guard at Rome in AD 143.

=== Undated Caecii ===
- Caecia, named in a sepulchral inscription from Rome.
- Marcus Caecius, made a libation in honour of Saturn at Mons Balcaranensis, now Jebel Boukornine in Tunisia, formerly part of Africa Proconsularis.
- Quintus Caecius C. f., mentioned in an inscription from Faventia in Cisalpine Gaul, along with Titus Caecius, perhaps his brother.
- Titus Caecius C. f., mentioned in an inscription from Faventia, along with Quintus Caecius, perhaps his brother.
- Vibius Caecius, named in a sepulchral inscription from Praeneste in Latium.
- Lucius Caecius Celerinus, buried at Ammaedara in Africa Proconsularis, aged eighty, along with Fannia Silvana, aged ninety.
- Gaius Caecius Nivalis, a youth buried at Castellum Elefantum in Numidia, aged fifteen.
- Caecia Prisca, the wife of Titus Calpurnius, dedicated a tomb at Ebora in Lusitania for her daughter, Calpurnia Rufiniana, aged thirty-three.

== See also ==
- List of Roman gentes

== Bibliography ==
- Marcus Tullius Cicero, Epistulae ad Atticum.
- Dictionary of Greek and Roman Biography and Mythology, William Smith, ed., Little, Brown and Company, Boston (1849).
- Theodor Mommsen et alii, Corpus Inscriptionum Latinarum (The Body of Latin Inscriptions, abbreviated CIL), Berlin-Brandenburgische Akademie der Wissenschaften (1853–present).
- Gustav Wilmanns, Inscriptiones Africae Latinae (Latin Inscriptions from Africa), Georg Reimer, Berlin (1881).
- René Cagnat et alii, L'Année épigraphique (The Year in Epigraphy, abbreviated AE), Presses Universitaires de France (1888–present).
- George Davis Chase, "The Origin of Roman Praenomina", in Harvard Studies in Classical Philology, vol. VIII, pp. 103–184 (1897).
- D.P. Simpson, Cassell's Latin and English Dictionary, Macmillan Publishing Company, New York (1963).
- Valentina Uglietti, "Via Emilia 187 a.C. - 2017", in On the Road (exhibition catalogue), Parma (2017).
