= Asclepiodotus of Lesbos =

Asclepiodotus (Ancient Greek: Ἀσκληπιόδοτος) of Lesbos was an ally of Mithridates VI of Pontus during the First Mithridatic War of 90–85 BC. He was close to Mithridates, and had once entertained him as a guest. In the later stages of the war, c. 85 BC, he joined with three other intimates of the king, Cleisthenes of Lesbos and Mynnio and Philotimus of Smyrna, in a conspiracy against him, but informed him of the plot, advising him to hide under a couch to hear Mynnio incriminate himself. The conspirators were tortured to death.
