= Utica, Tunisia =

Ancient Phoenician and Carthaginian city

Utica
- أُتِيكْ (Arabic)
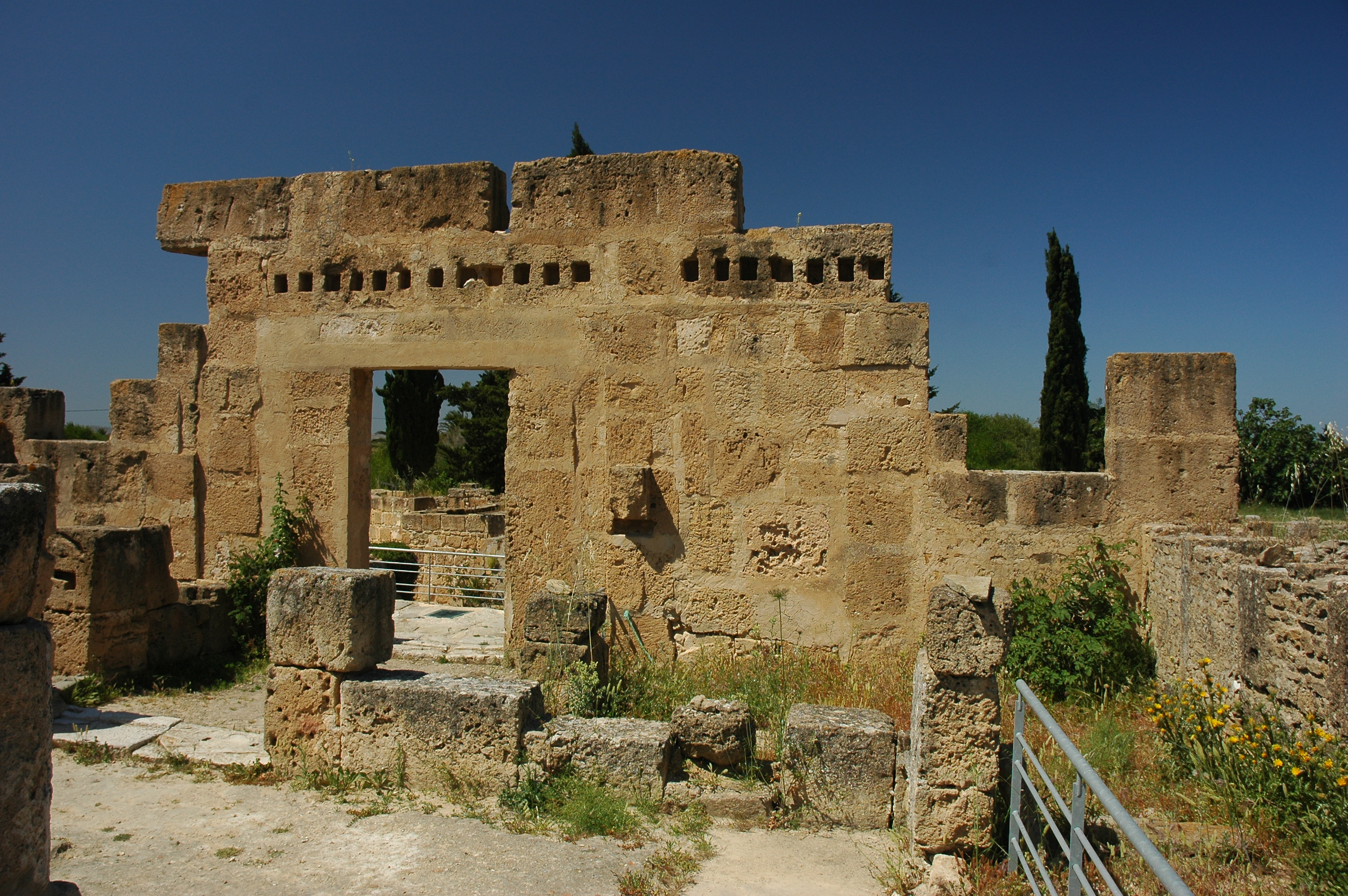
- The ruins of Utica
- Interactive map of Utica
- 37°3′25″N 10°3′43″E
- Type: Settlement
- Periods: Early Iron Age to Byzantine Empire
- Location: Zana, Bizerte Governorate; Tunisia

History
- Built: 1101 BC
- Built by: Phoenician colonists
- Abandoned: 700 AD

Utica (/ˌjuːtɪkə/) ; ( Phoenician: 𐤏𐤕𐤒 , lit. ‘Old’ or ‘Ancient’ )was an ancient Phoenician and Carthaginian city located near the outflow of the Medjerda River into the Mediterranean, between Carthage in the south and Hippo Diarrhytus (present-day Bizerte) in the north. It is traditionally considered to have been the first colony founded by the Phoenicians in North Africa. After Carthage's loss to Rome in the Punic Wars, Utica was an important Roman colony for seven centuries.

Utica no longer exists, and its remains are located in Bizerte Governorate in Tunisia – not on the coast where it once lay, but further inland because deforestation and agriculture upriver led to massive soil erosion leading to the silting up of the Medjerda River's original mouth.

== Etymology ==
Utica (Classical Latin: [ˈʊ.t̪ɪ.ka]) is an unusual latinization of the Punic name ʿtq (𐤏𐤕𐤒) or ʿtg (𐤏𐤕𐤂). These derived from Phoenician ˁAtiq (ʿtq), cognate with Arabic ˁatiqah (عَتِيقَة) and Hebrew ˁatiq (עתיק, seen in the title of God, "Ancient of Days"). These all mean "Old" and contrast the settlement with the later colony Carthage, whose own name literally meant "New Town". The latinization is somewhat unusual in that the Latin U more often transcribed the letter W (i.e., waw) in Punic names.

The Greeks called it Ityke (Ἰτύκη).

== History ==
=== Phoenician colony ===
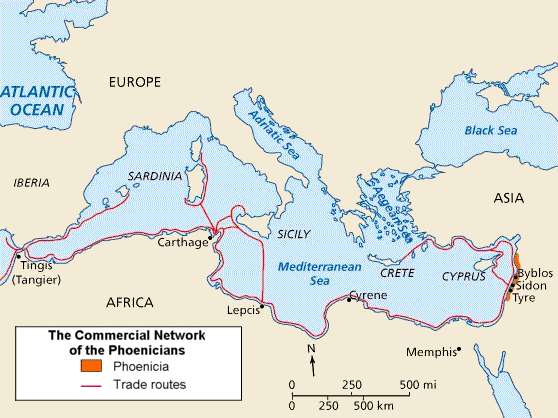
Phoenician trade routes 1200 BC–539 BC

Utica was founded as a port located on the trade route leading from Phoenicia to the Straits of Gibraltar and the Atlantic Ocean, facilitating trade in commodities like tin.

The exact founding date of Utica is a matter of controversy. Several classical authors date its foundation to around 1100 BC. The archaeological evidence, however, suggests a foundation no earlier than the eighth century BC. The inland settlement used Rusucmona ("Cape Eshmun") on Cape Farina to the northeast as its chief port, although continued silting has rendered the present-day settlement at Ghar el-Melh a small farming community. Although Carthage was later founded about 40 kilometres (25 mi) from Utica, records suggest "that until 540 BC Utica was still maintaining political and economic autonomy in relation to its powerful Carthaginian neighbour".

=== Carthaginian rule ===
By the fourth century BC, Utica came under Punic control, but continued to exist as a privileged ally of Carthage. Soon, commercial rivalry created problems between Carthage and Utica.

This relationship between Carthage and Utica began to disintegrate after the First Punic War, with the outbreak of rebellion among mercenaries who had not received compensation for their service to Carthage. Originally, Utica refused to participate in this rebellion, so that the Libu forces led by Spendius and Matho laid siege to Utica and nearby Hippocritae.

The Carthaginian generals Hanno and Hamilcar then came to Utica's defense, managing to raise the siege, but "the severest blow of all… was the defection of Hippacritae and Utica, the only two cities in Libya which had…bravely faced the present war…indeed they never had on any occasion given the least sign of hostility to Carthage." Eventually, the forces of Carthage proved victorious, forcing Utica and Hippacritae to surrender after a short siege.

=== Roman rule ===
Utica again defied Carthage in the Third Punic War, when it surrendered to Rome shortly before the breakout of war in 150 BC. After its victory, Rome rewarded Utica by granting it an expanse of territory stretching from Carthage to Hippo.

As a result of the war, Rome created a new province of Africa, and Utica became its capital, which meant that the governor's residence was there along with a small garrison. Over the following decades Utica also attracted Roman citizens who settled there to do business.

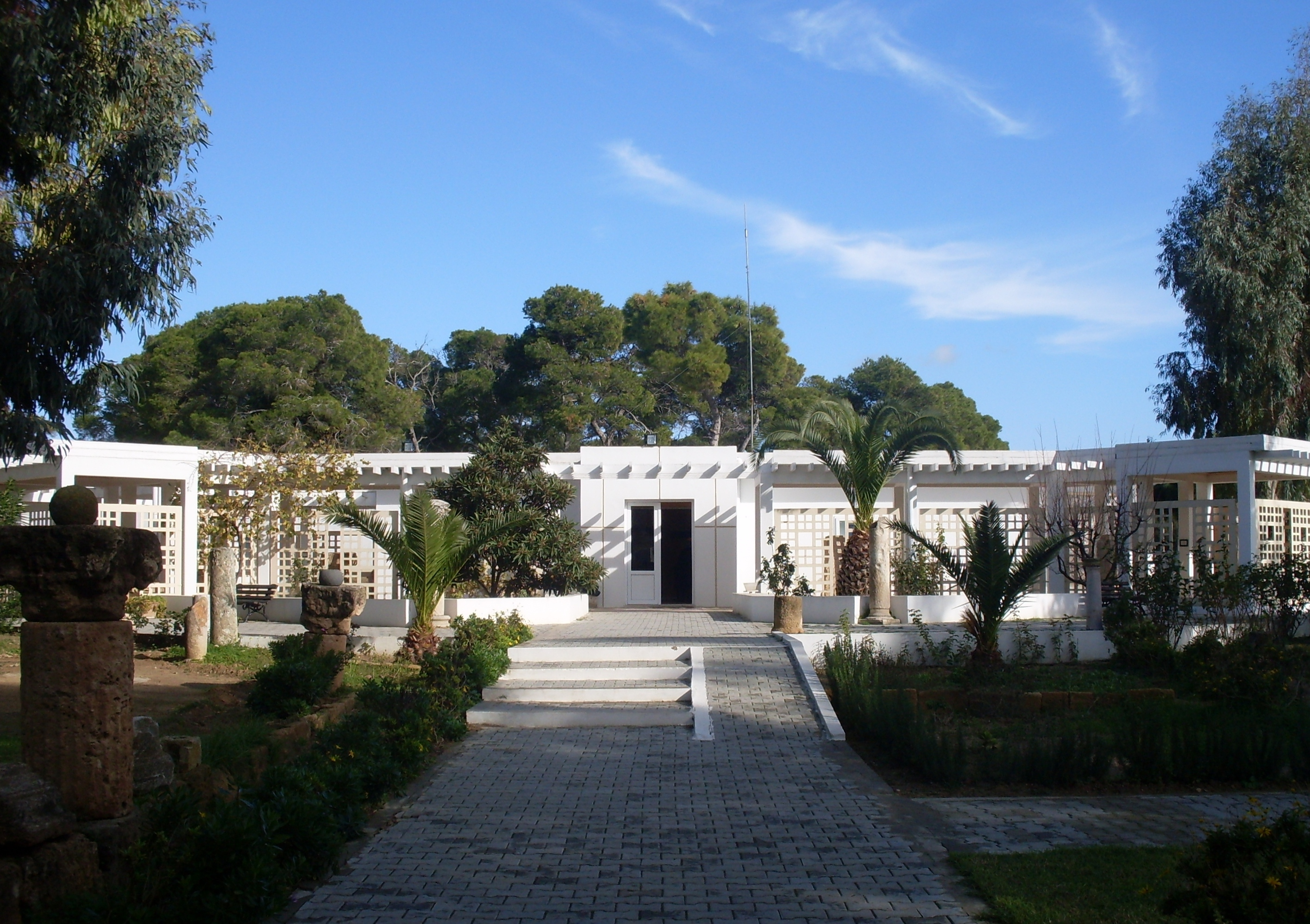
Utica museum, museum established in 1990

During the Roman Civil War between the supporters of Pompey and Caesar, the Battle of Utica (49 BC) was fought between Julius Caesar's general Gaius Scribonius Curio and Pompeian legionaries commanded by Publius Attius Varus supported by Numidian cavalry and foot soldiers. Curio defeated the Pompeians and Numidians and drove Varus back into the town of Utica, but then withdrew. Later at the Battle of Thapsus in 46 BC the remaining Pompeians, including Cato the Younger, fled to Utica after being defeated. Caesar pursued them to Utica, meeting no resistance from the inhabitants. Cato, who was the leader of the Pompeians, ensured the escape of his fellow senators and anyone else who desired to leave, then died of suicide, unwilling to accept the clemency of Caesar.

Displaying their fondness for Cato, "the people of Utica...called Cato their saviour and benefactor... And this they continued to do even when word was brought that Caesar was approaching. They decked his body in splendid fashion, gave it an illustrious escort, and buried it near the sea, where a statue of him now stands, sword in hand". After his death, Cato was given the name of Uticensis, due to the place of his death as well as to his public glorification and burial by the citizens of Utica.

Utica obtained the formal status of a municipium in 36 BC and its inhabitants became members of the Quirina tribe. The city was chosen by the Romans as the place where the governor of their new Africa Province was resident, but the silting of the port (because of the Medjerda River) damaged the importance of Utica.

During the reign of Augustus, however, the seat of provincial government was moved to a since rebuilt Carthage, although Utica did not lose its status as one of the foremost cities in the province. When Hadrian was emperor, Utica requested to become a full Roman colony, but this request was not granted until Septimius Severus, a native of the Province of Africa, took the throne.

Already eclipsed by the preeminence of Carthage, Utica was faced with the progressive silting up of its port and consequent isolation in the midst of marshy lands. By converting its activity to further cultivation of its agricultural territory, it prolonged its life right up to the end of ancient times....Utica had been endowed from the first century B.C. with the Roman buildings essential to comfortable urban life: forum, temples, baths, amphitheater, circus, in addition to dwellings. Most of these structures were placed in the grid of an orthogonal plan which covered a large part of the city. -Marian Holland

The city and all the area east of the Fossatum Africae was nearly fully romanised by the time of Septimius Severus. According to historian Theodore Mommsen, all the inhabitants of Utica spoke Latin and practised Christianity in the fourth and early fifth century. The Peutinger Map from around this time shows the town.

=== Destruction ===
In 439 AD, the Vandals captured Utica. In 534 AD, the Byzantines captured it once more. Finally, the Arabs were responsible for its ultimate destruction around 700 AD. "Excavations at the site have yielded two Punic cemeteries and Roman ruins, including baths and a villa with mosaics".

== Diocese of Utica ==
Roman Utica was a Christian city with an important diocese in Africa Proconsularis.

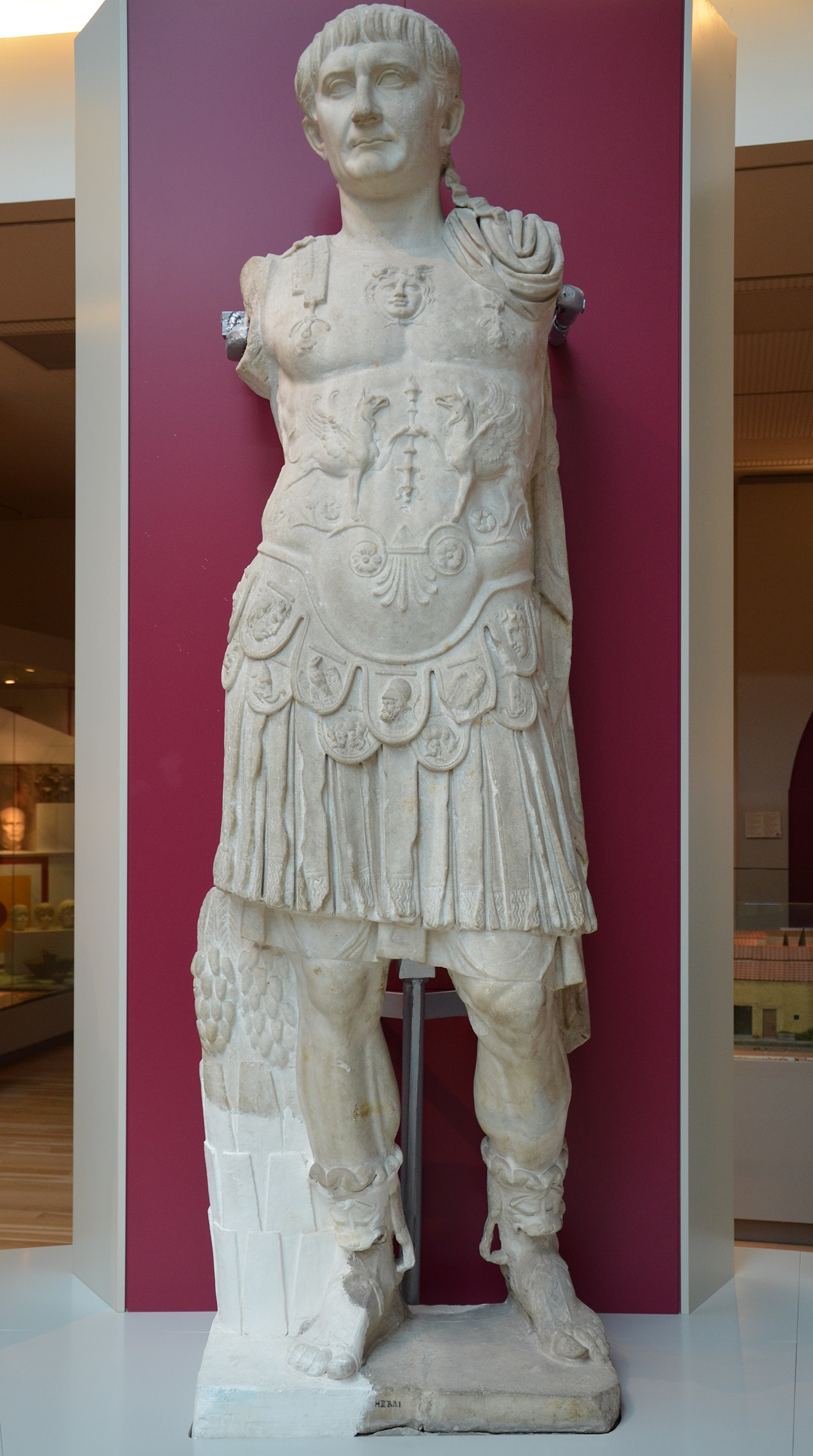
Statue of Trajan from Utica ruins

Indeed, there are more than a dozen bishops documented in Utica. The first, Aurelius, intervened at the council held at Carthage in 256 AD by St. Cyprian to discuss the question of the lapsi. Maurus, the second bishop, was accused of apostasy during the Diocletianic Persecution of 303. The third, Victorius, took part in the Council of Arles in 314 AD along with Cecilianus of Carthage; he is mentioned in the Roman Martyrology on 23 August. Then the fourth, Quietus, assisted at the Council of Carthage (349) proclaimed by Gratus.

At the Conference of Carthage (411) which saw gathered together the bishops of Nicene Christianity and of heretical Donatism Victorius II took part for the Church and Gedudus for the Donatists. The historian Morcelli added the bishop Gallonianus, present at the Council of Carthage (419), who, according to J. Mesnage, instead belonged to the Diocese of Utina. Then the Bishop Florentius, who intervened at the Synod of Carthage (484), was met by the Vandal king Huneric, after which he was exiled.

Faustinianus participated at the Council of Carthage (525). He was followed by the bishop Giunilius, an ecclesiastical writer, who dedicated his works to Primasius of Hadrumetum. In the seventh century was the bishop Flavianus, who assisted at the Council of Carthage (646) against Monothelitism; and Potentinus, who was exiled in Spain and intervened at the Council of Toledo (684).

With the Arab conquest, Utica was destroyed and disappeared even as an independent diocese. Only during the early Renaissance Utica was again a diocese, when the Spanish Empire conquered the region for some decades and Pedro del Campo was named bishop of the recreated Diocese of Utica in 1516 AD.

== Ruins ==
The site of the ruins of Utica is set on a low hill, composed of several Roman villas. Their walls still preserve decorative floor mosaics. To the northwest of these villas is a Punic necropolis, with Punic sarcophagi 20 feet (6.1 metres) below the Roman level.

Currently, the site is located about 30 km from Tunis and 30 km from Bizerte and near cities with four other historical sites:

- Zhana: village two kilometers from the site and has some important monuments;
- Ghar El Melh : city located on a narrow strip of land between the mountains and the sea and welcoming several fortresses;
- El Alia : city which houses monuments Andalusian style;
- Metline : coastal town of Andalucian style.

The House of the Cascade at Utica is typical of most Roman houses excavated in North Africa.

== Notable people ==
- Dionysius of Utica was an ancient Greek writer from Utica.
- Quadratus of Utica was a hieromartyr and Bishop of Utica during the reign of Emperor Valerian.

== Gallery ==
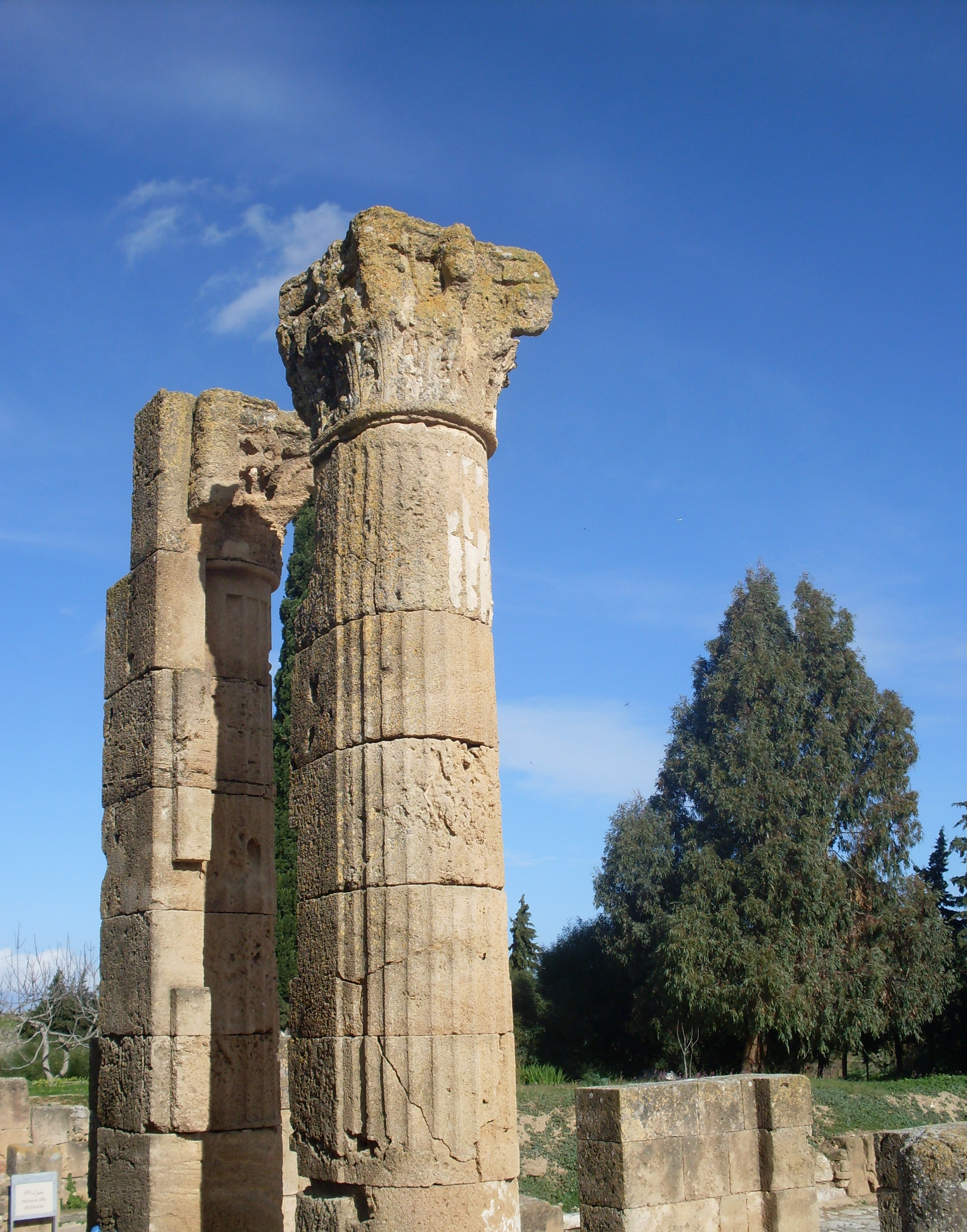
Utica columns

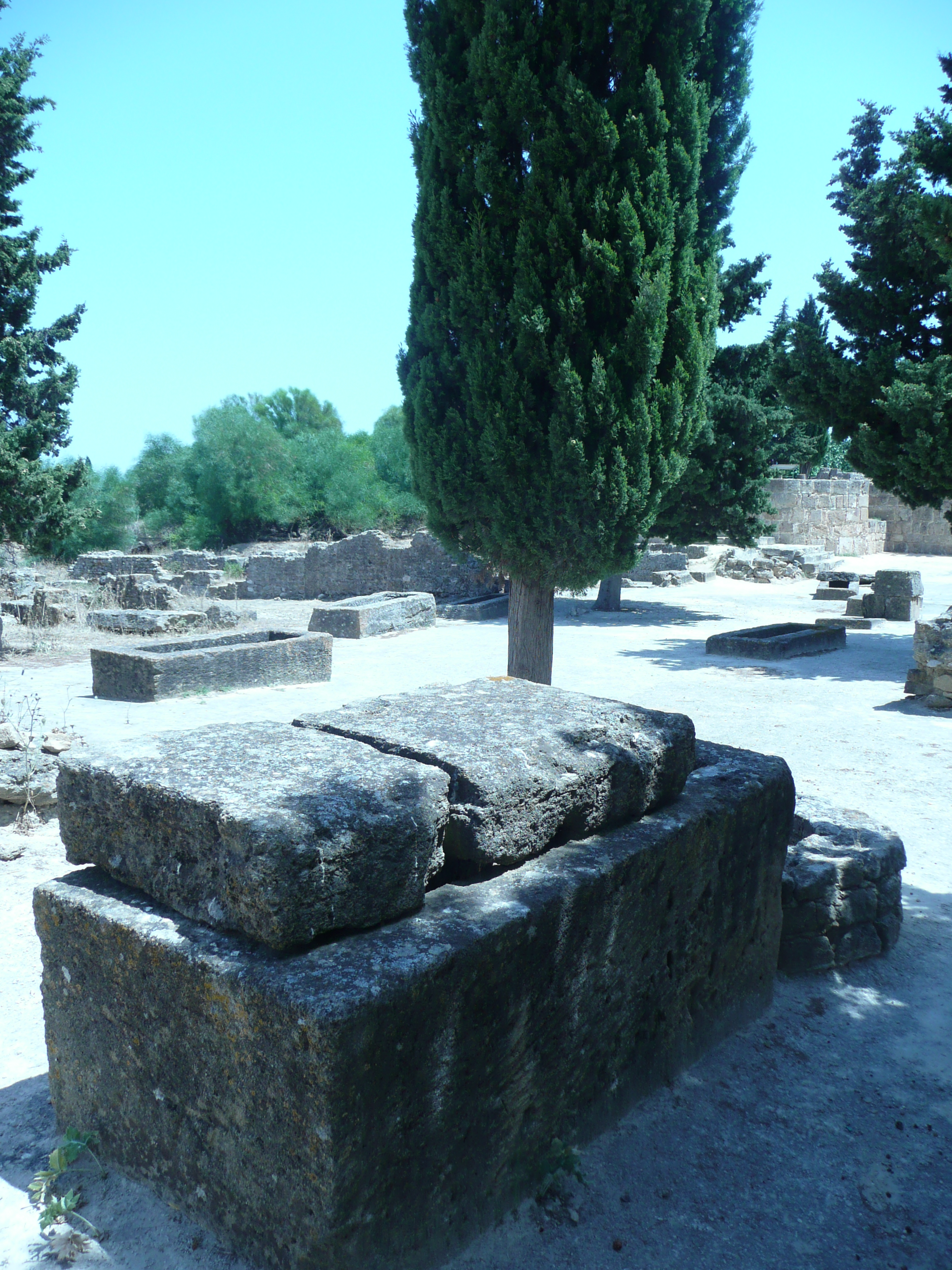
Punic Tomb

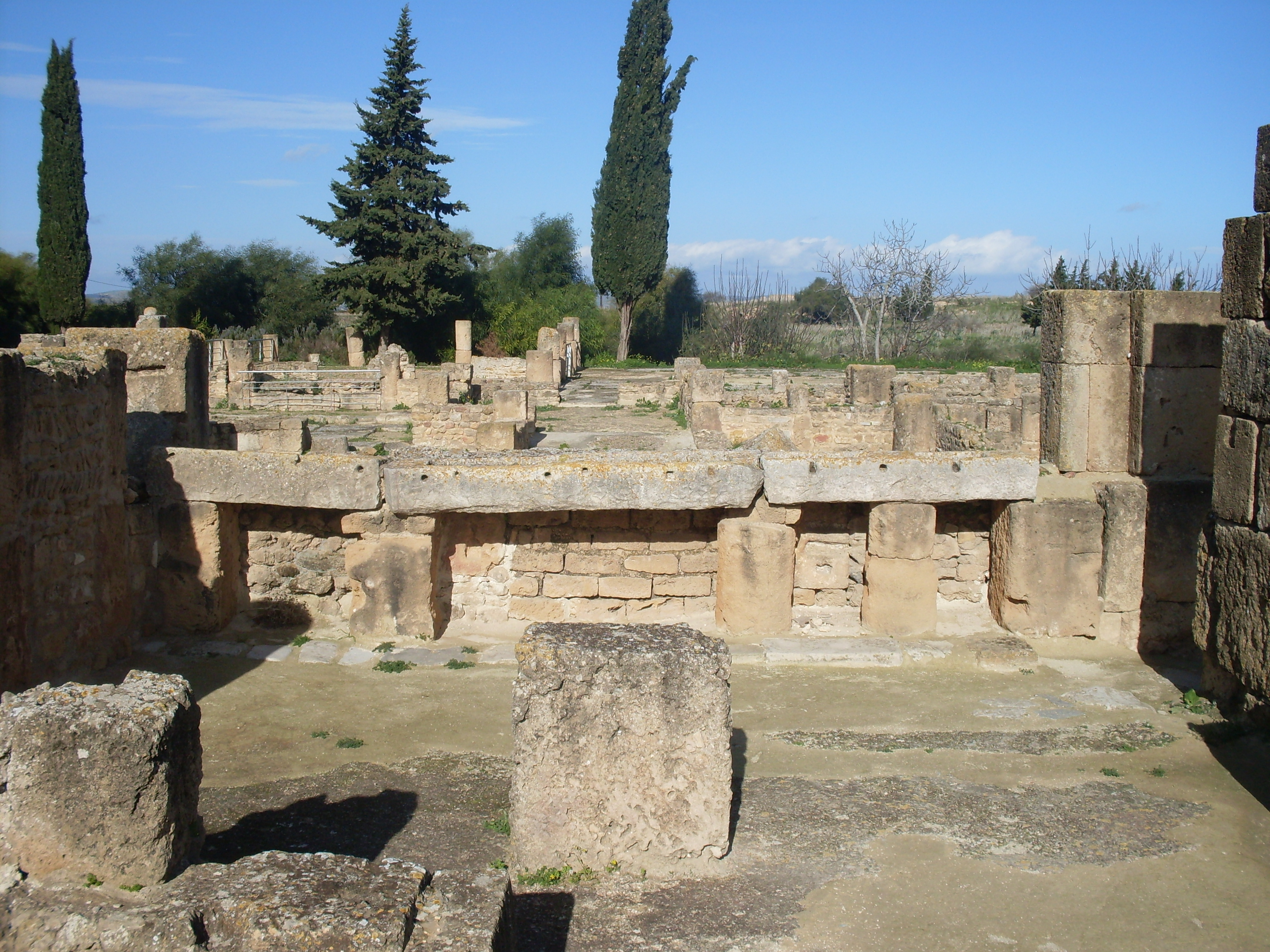
House Insula 1, Archaeological site of Utica, Tunisia

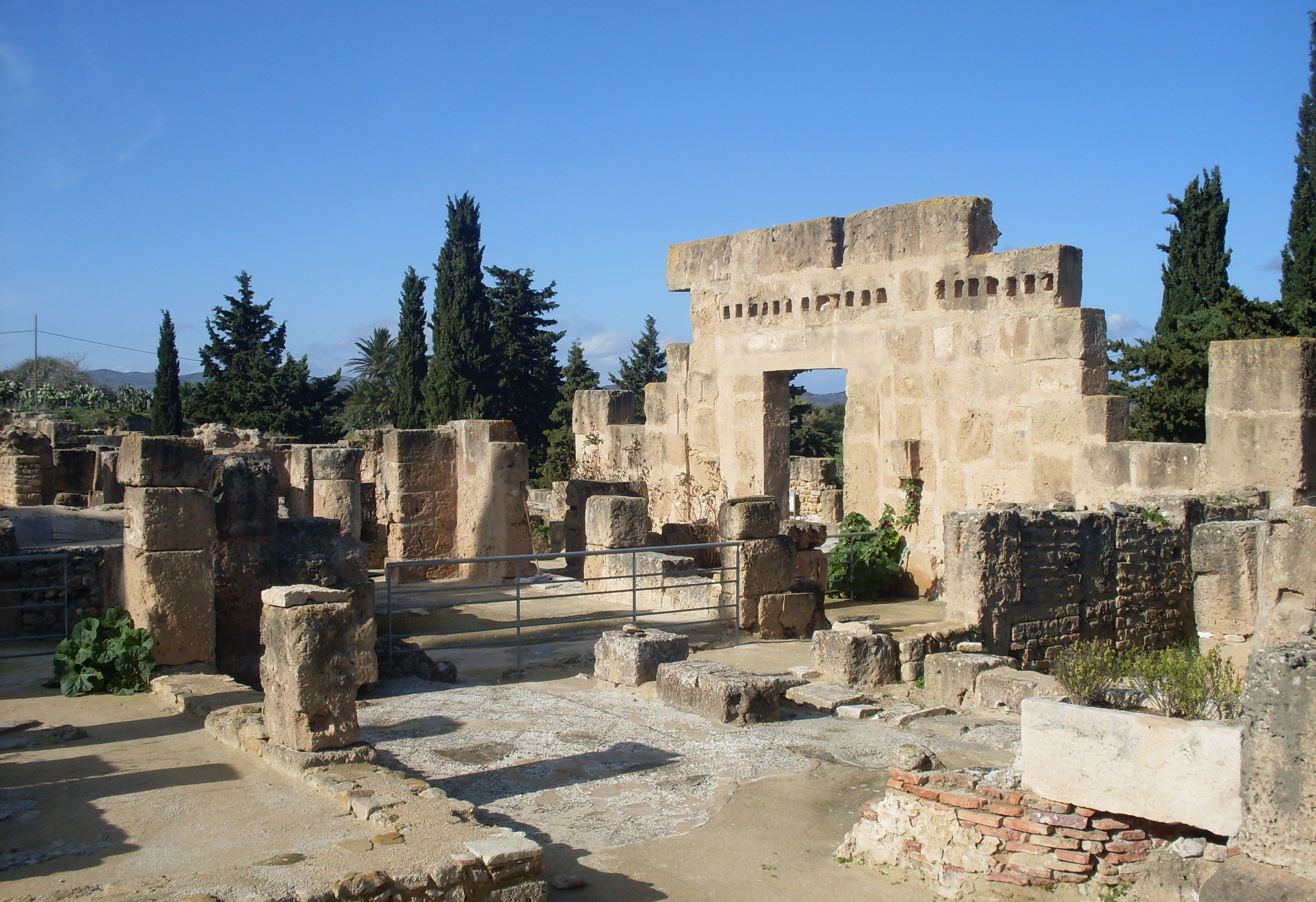
House Insula 2, Archaeological site of Utica, Tunisia

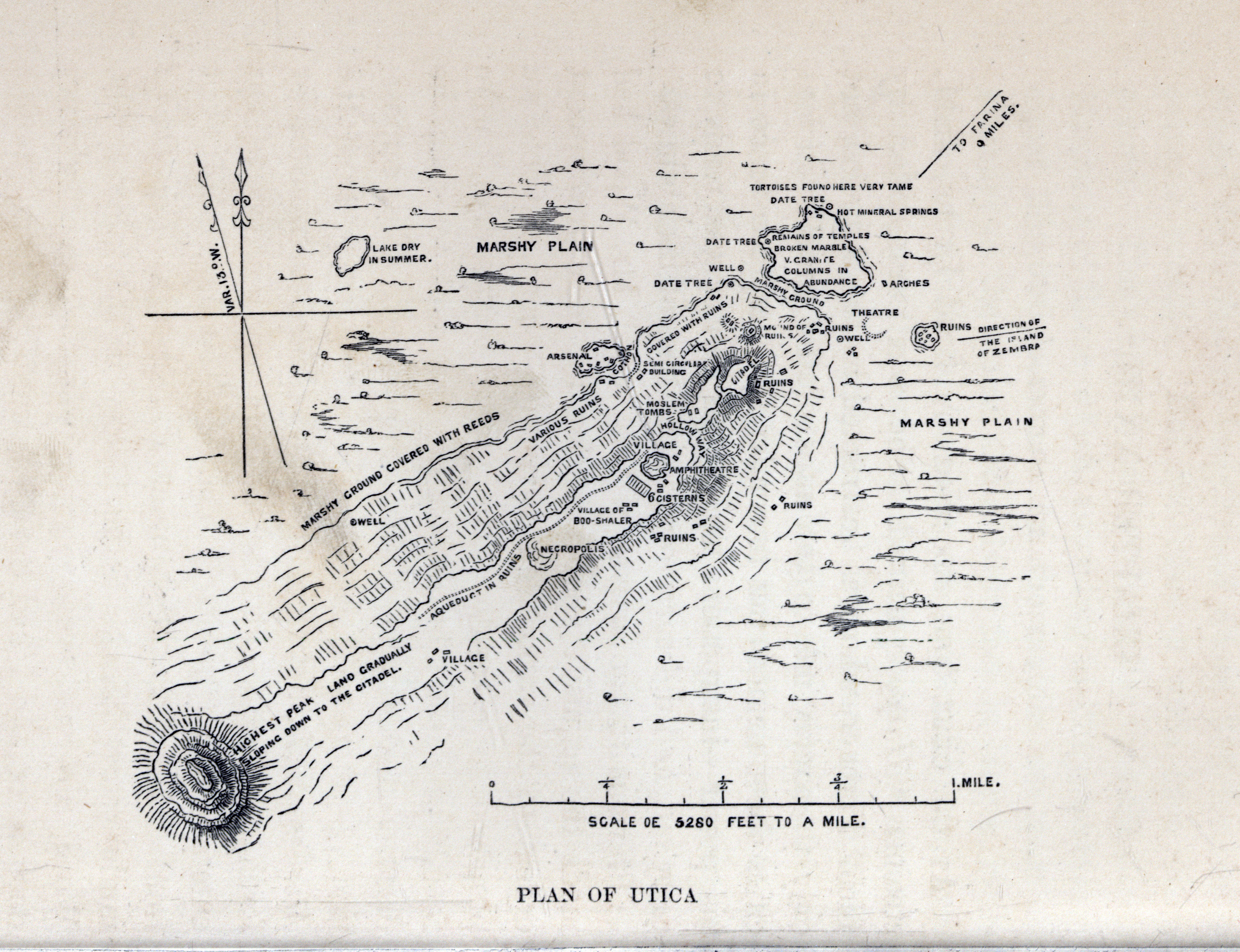
Plan of Utica, Tunisia (1862)

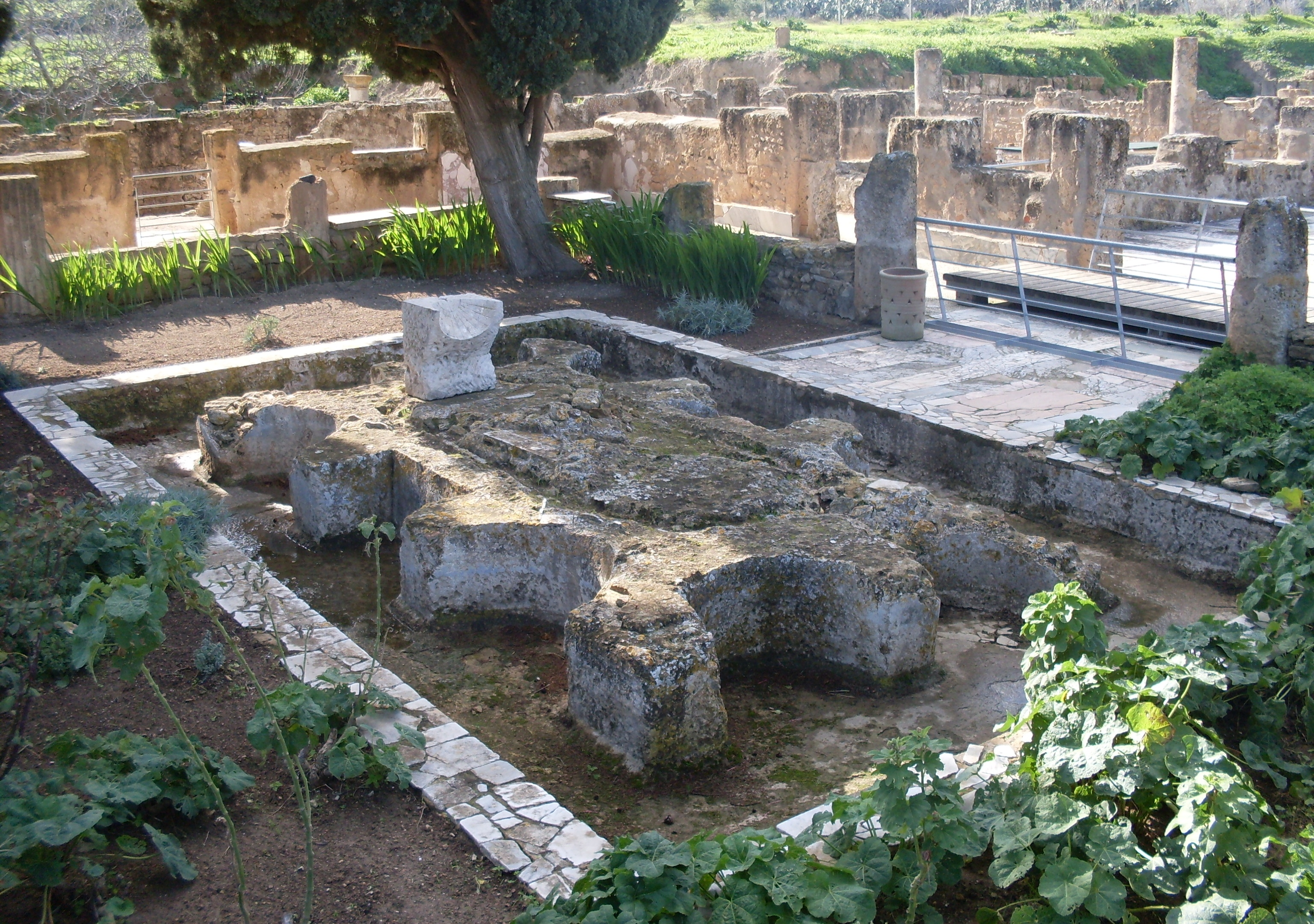
Fountain in the form of turtle

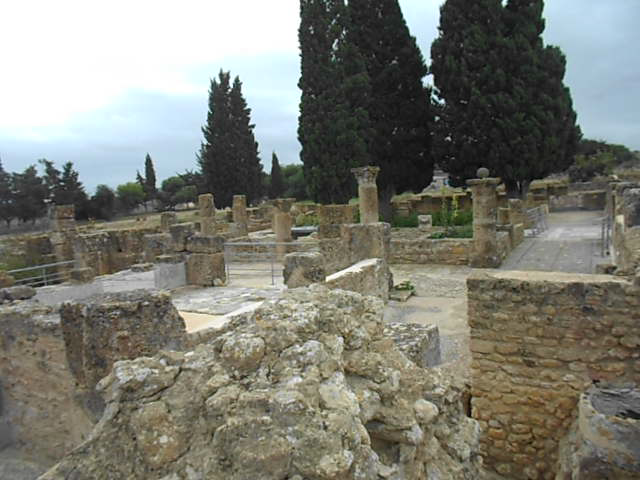
the ruins of Utica

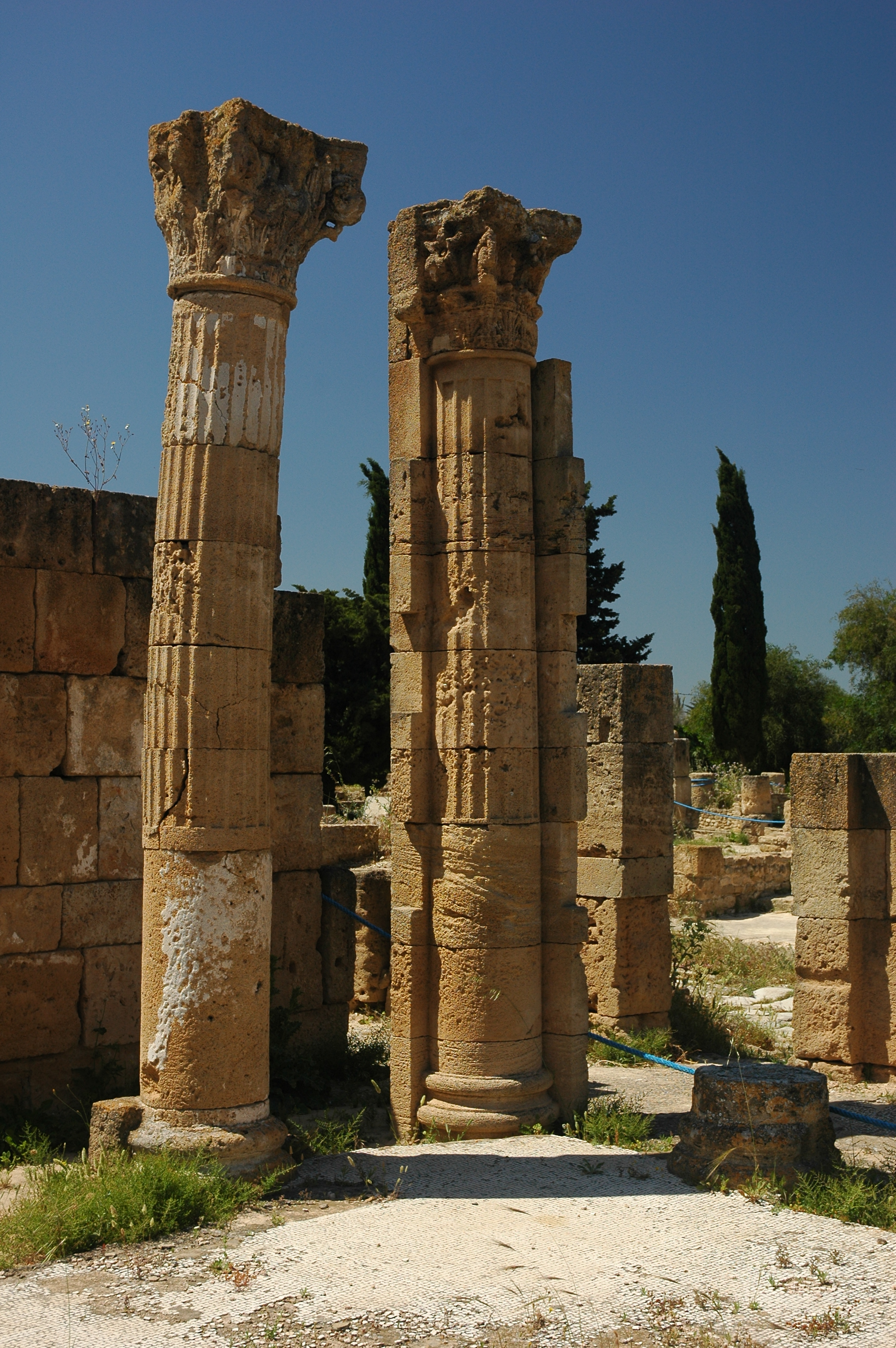
Utica columns 3

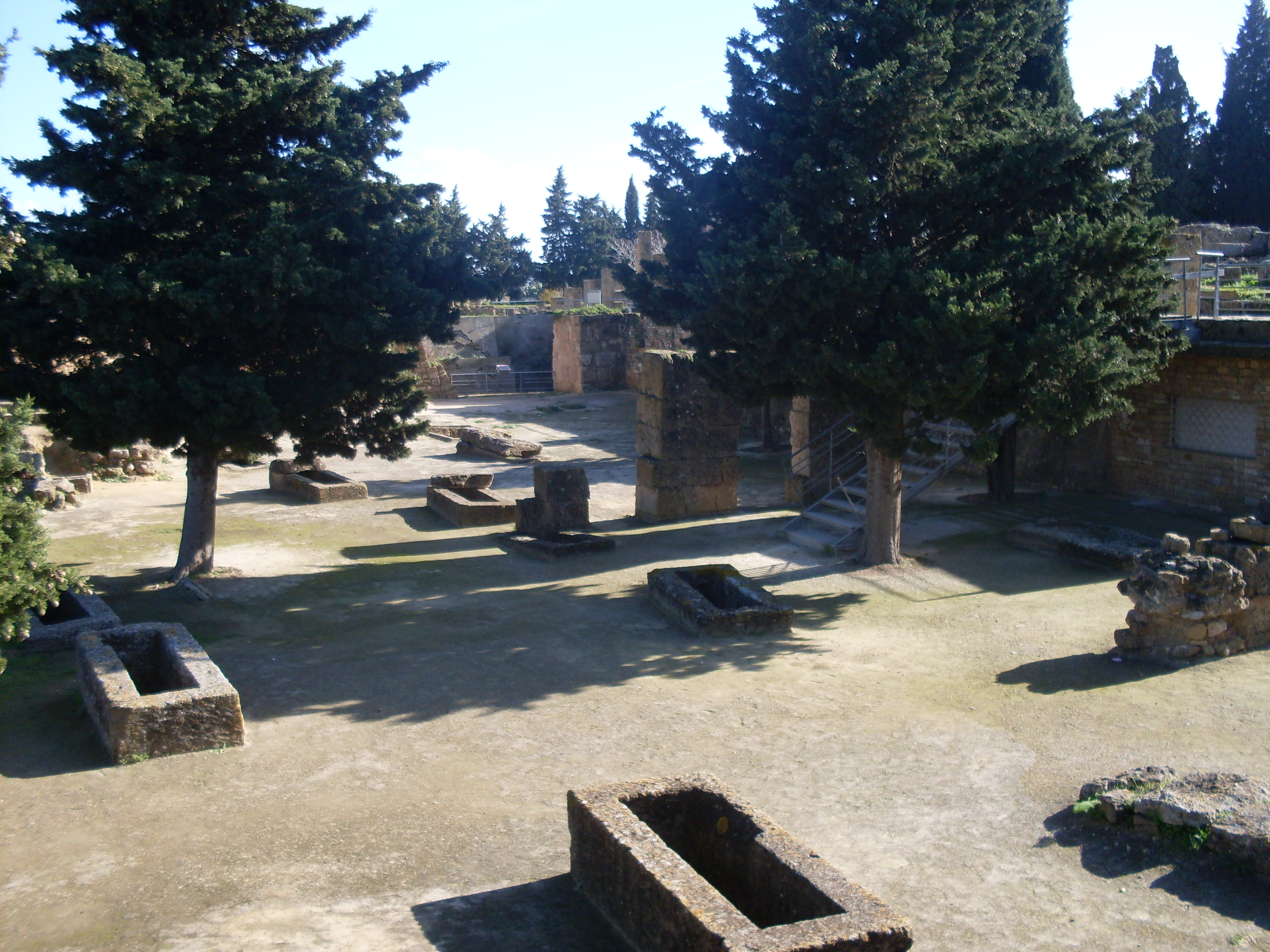
Punic necropolis

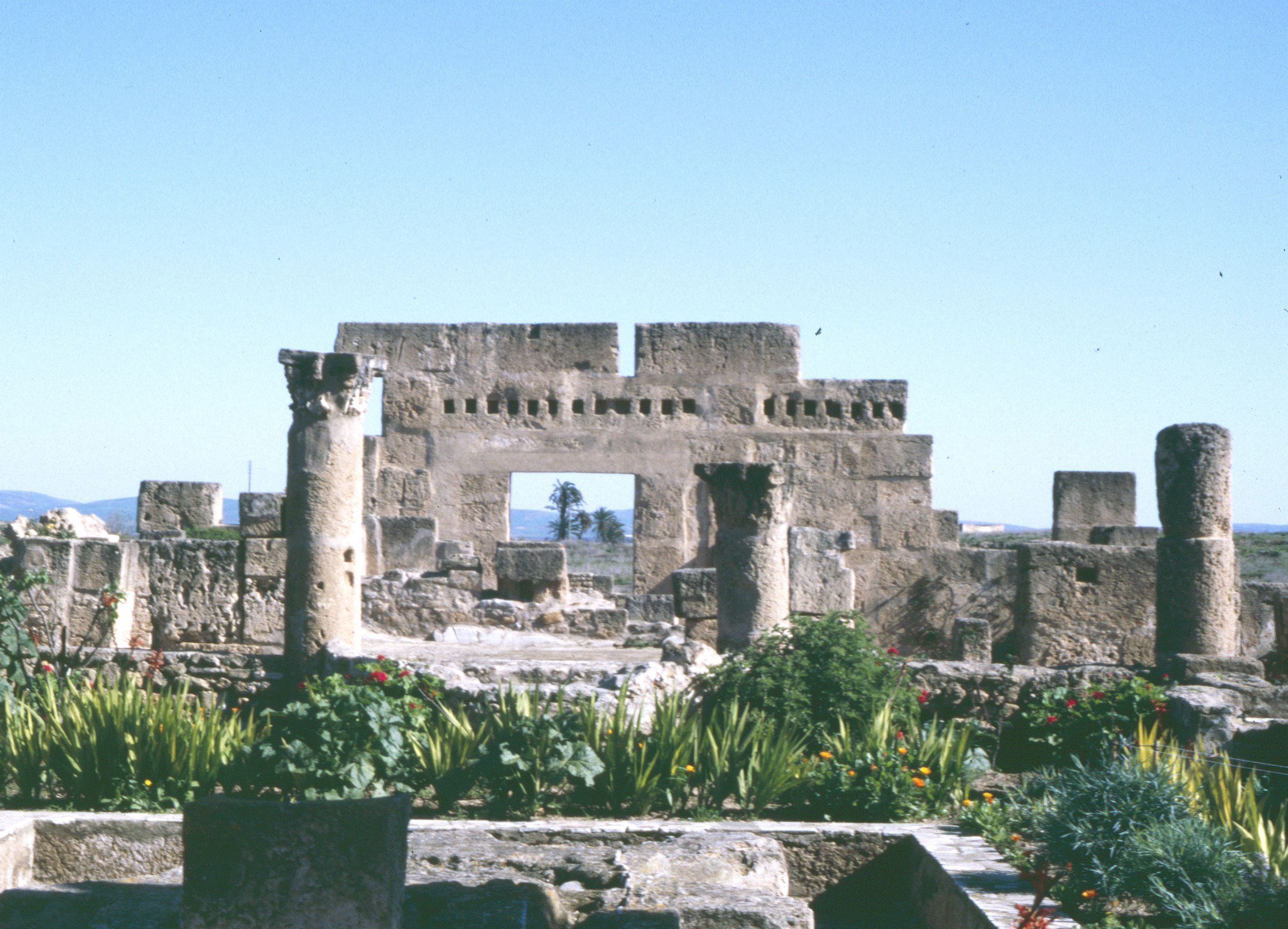
Archaeological site of Utica, Tunisia

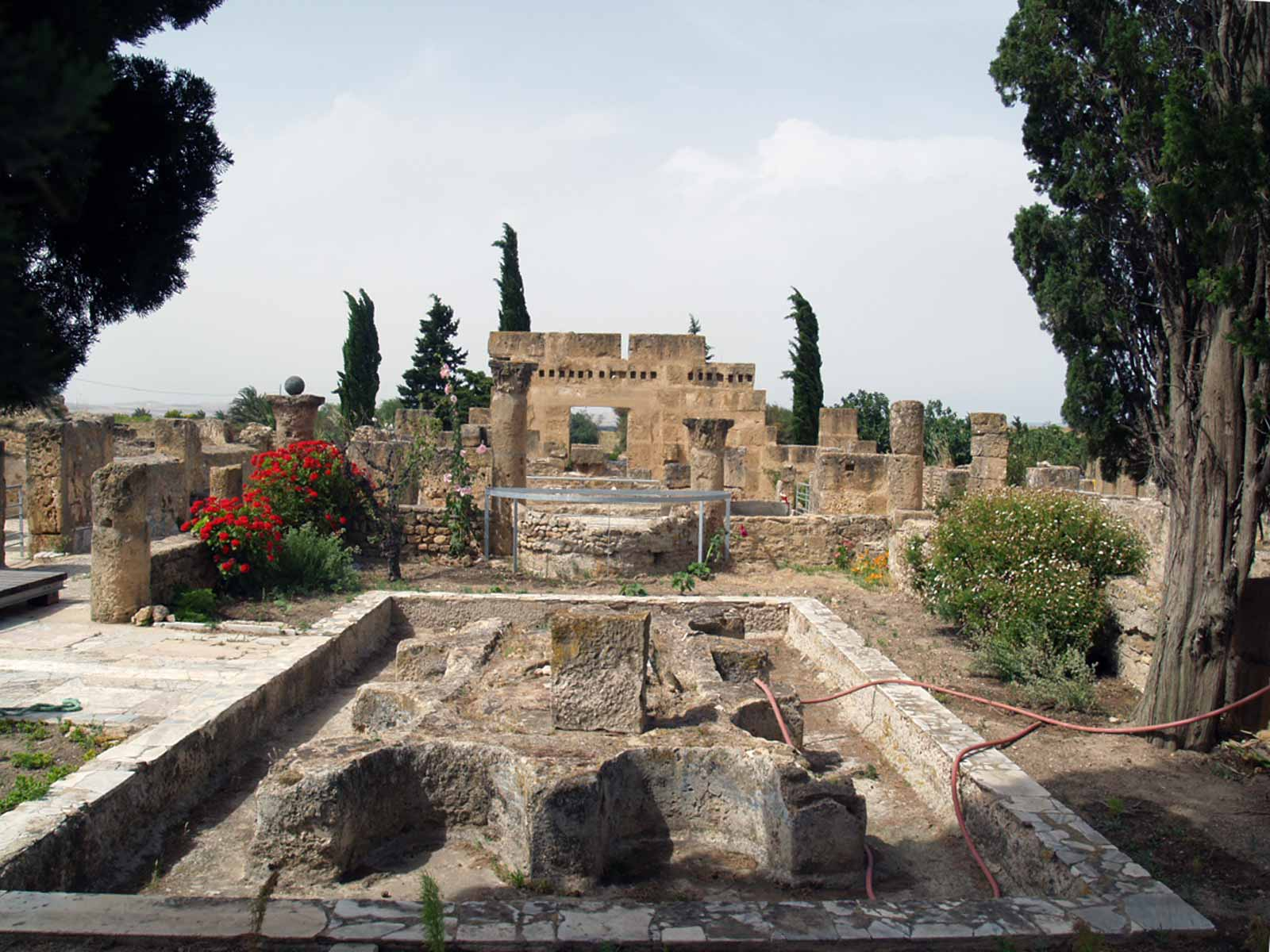
Fountain in the form of turtle 3

== See also ==
- Caesarea
- Cirta
- Thamugadi
- Lambaesis
- Thysdrus
- Volubilis
- Leptis Magna
- Carthago
- Utica, New York
