= Asclepiodotus (physician) =

Greek physician, mathematician, and musician of the late 5th century CE

Asclepiodotus (Ancient Greek: Ἀσκληπιόδοτος) was a Greek physician, mathematician, and musician of the late 5th century AD, who was best known for promoting the medicinal uses of white hellebore. He was a pupil of Jacobus Psychrestus, and is mentioned by Damascius.
