= Cassius Asclepiodotus =

Cassius Asclepiodotus was a wealthy man from Nicaea, Bithynia, who was stripped of his property and driven into exile by Nero in AD 67, because he had continued to speak admiringly of the former proconsul Quintus Marcius Barea Soranus even after his disgrace and suicide. He was later restored by Galba.
