= Gates of Sfax =

Entrance gates to the Medina quarter of Sfax in Tunisia

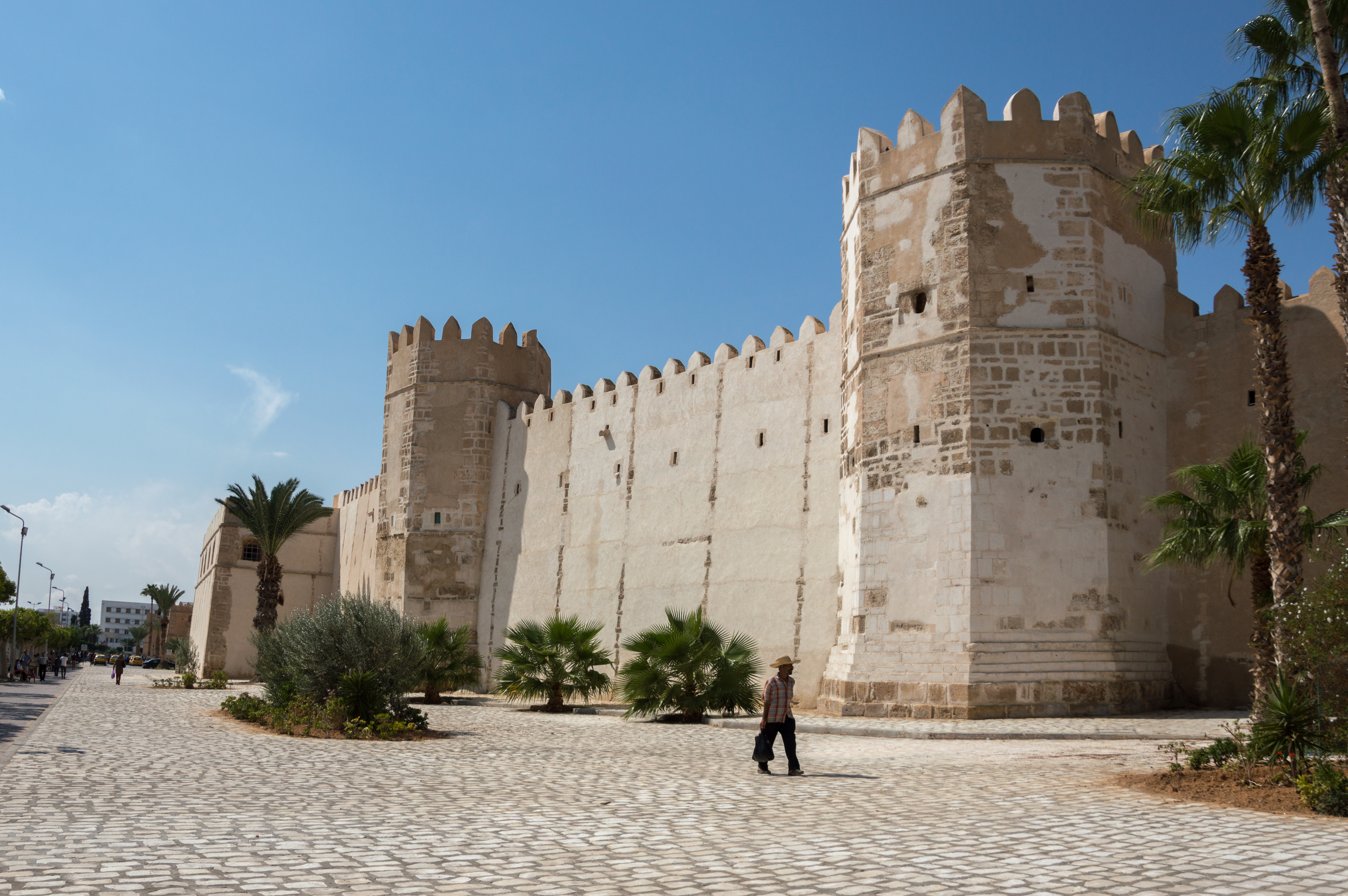
Medina of Sfax

The gates of Sfax are the entrances into the Medina quarter of Sfax, Tunisia.

== History ==
Until the 20th century, the medina of Sfax had only two entrances: Bab Diwan in the southern facade, and Bab Jebli in the northern one. During the 20th century, many new gates were built in order to decongest the medina and promote the exchange with the external areas.

== List of the gates ==
- Bab Diwan
- Bab Jebli
- Bab Jebli Jedid
- Bab El Ksar
- Bab El Kasbah
- Bab Nahj El Bey
- Bab Borj Ennar
- Bab Charki
- Bab Gharbi

== Gallery ==
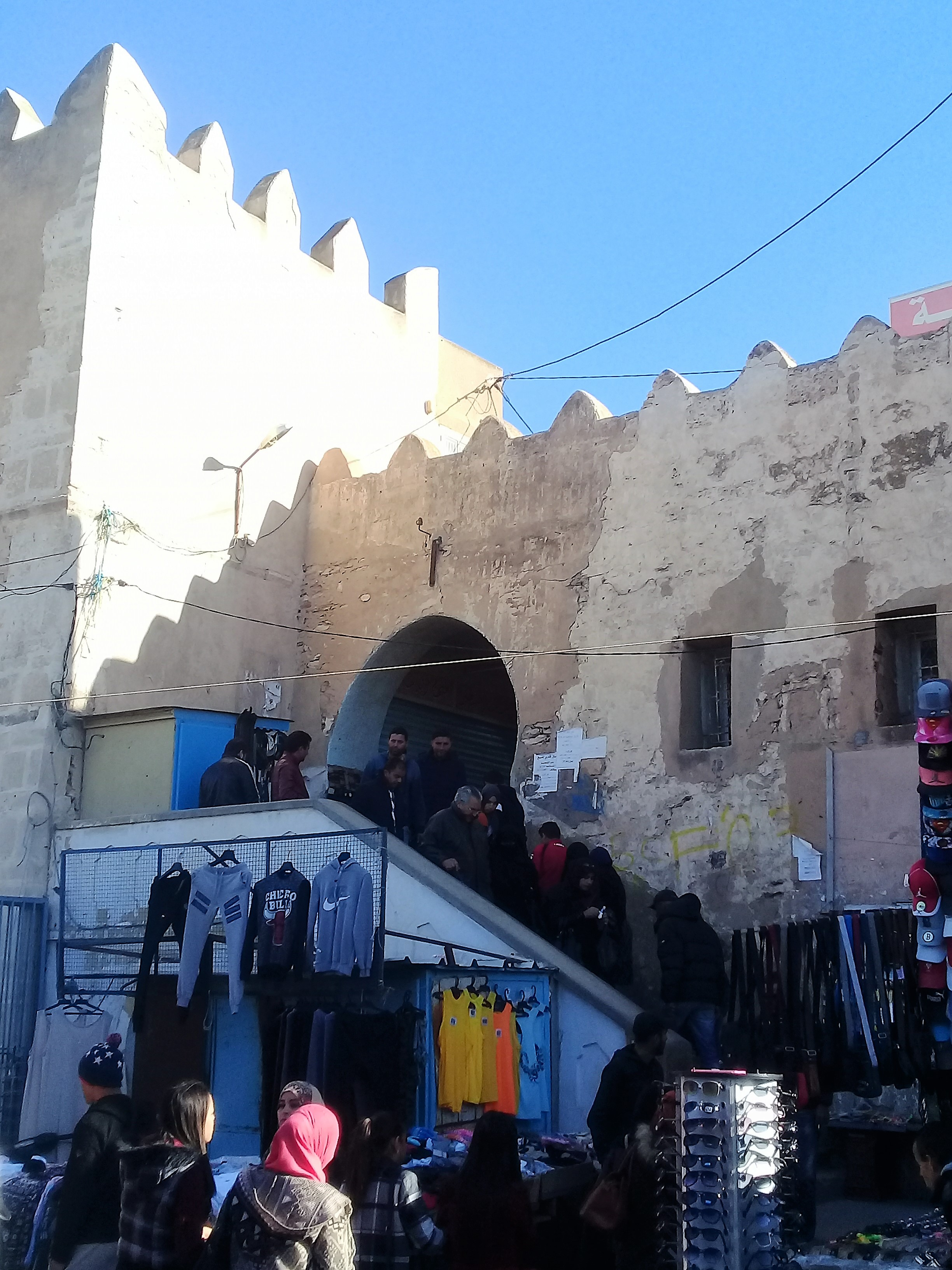
Bab Nahj El Bey

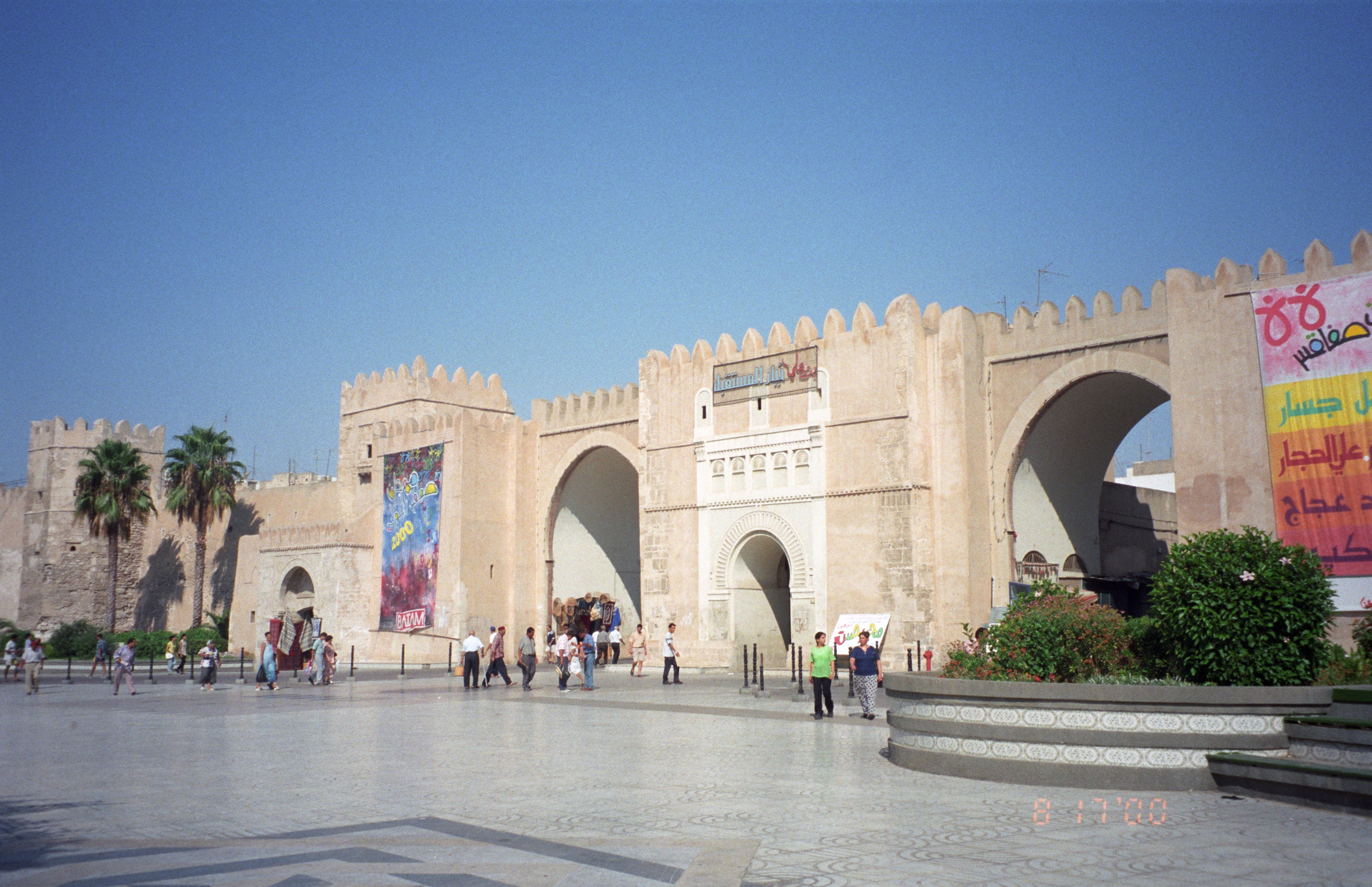
Bab Diwan

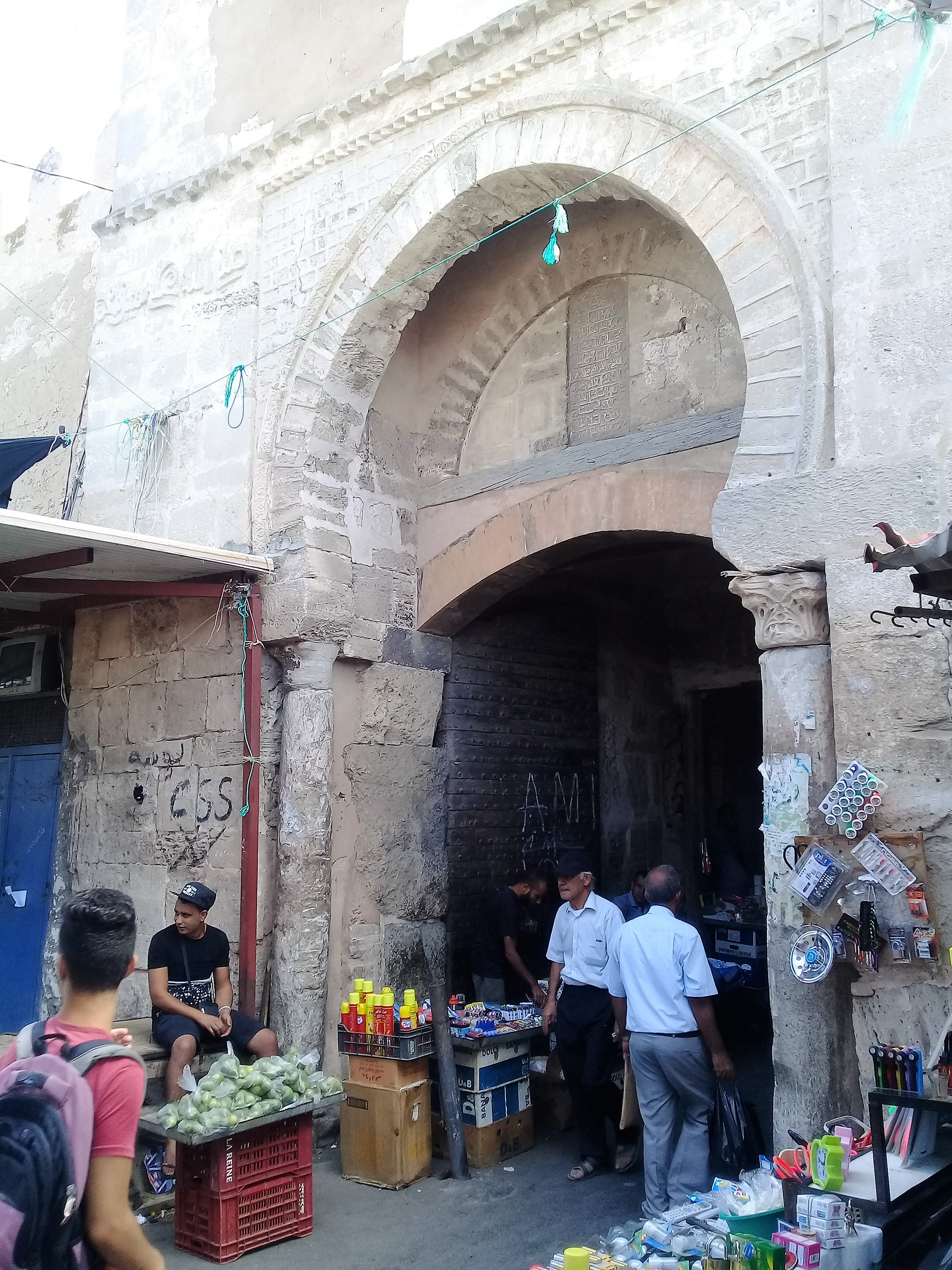
Bab Jebli

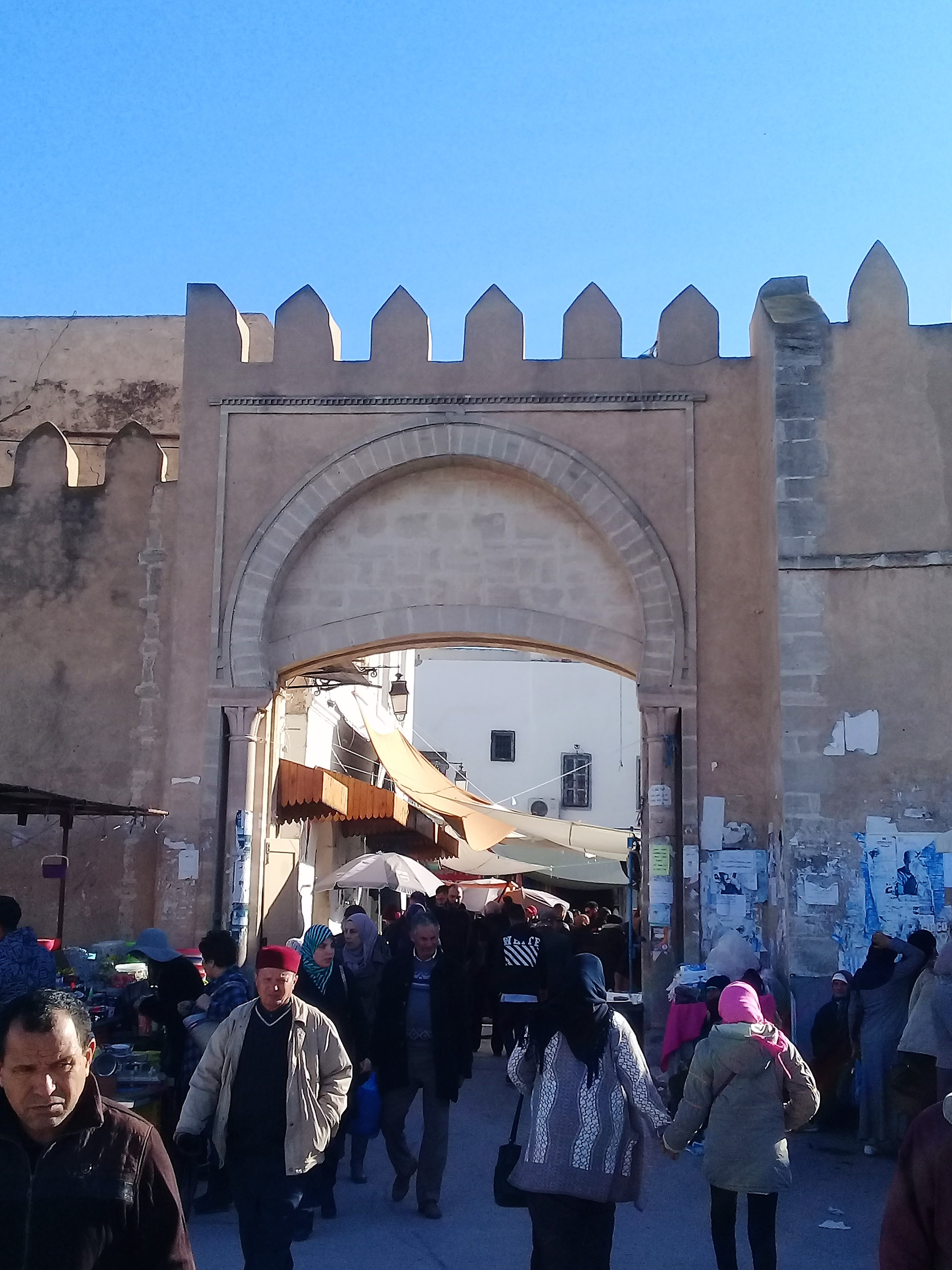
Bab Jebli Jedid

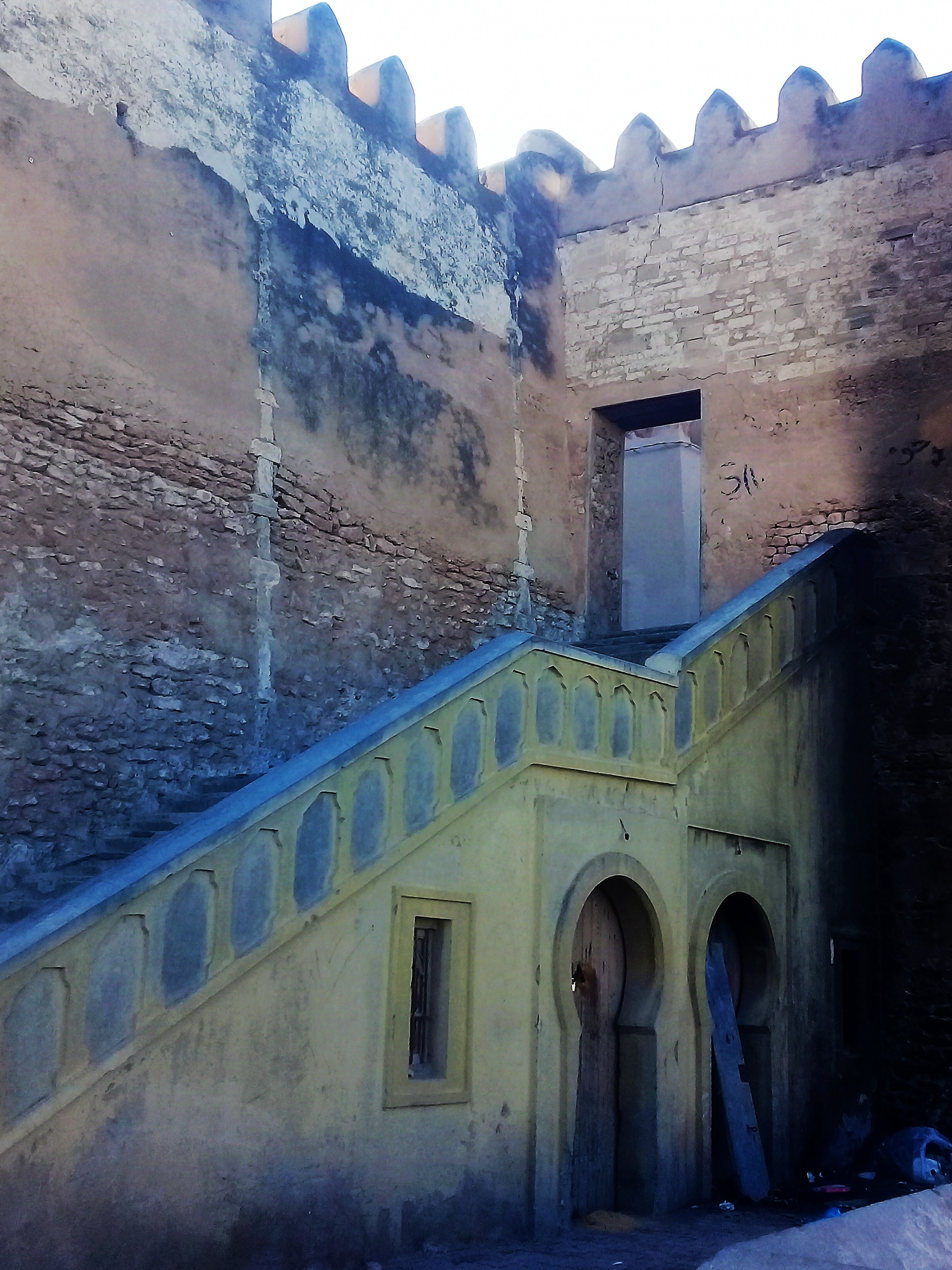
Bab El Ksar

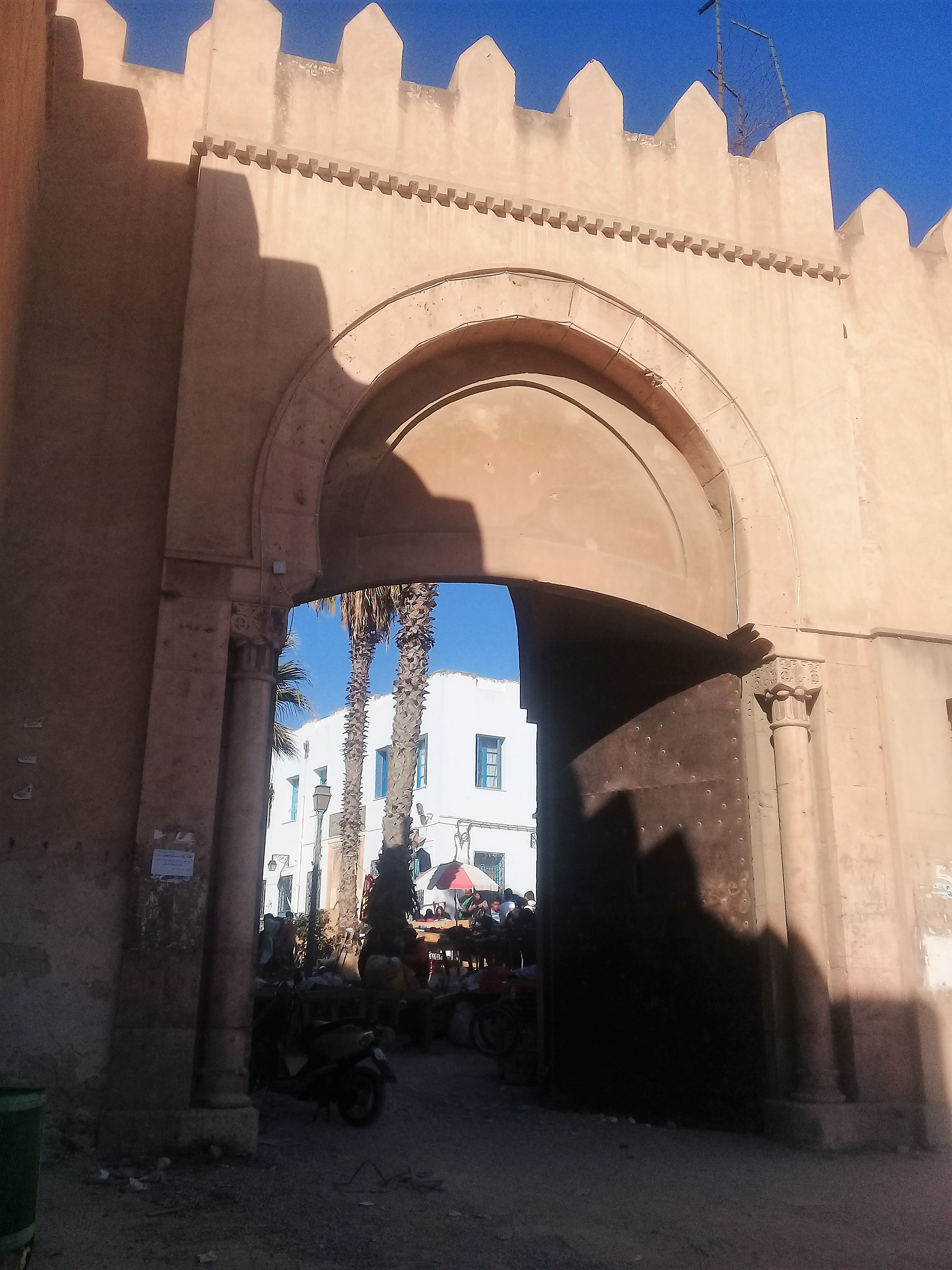
Bab El Kasbah

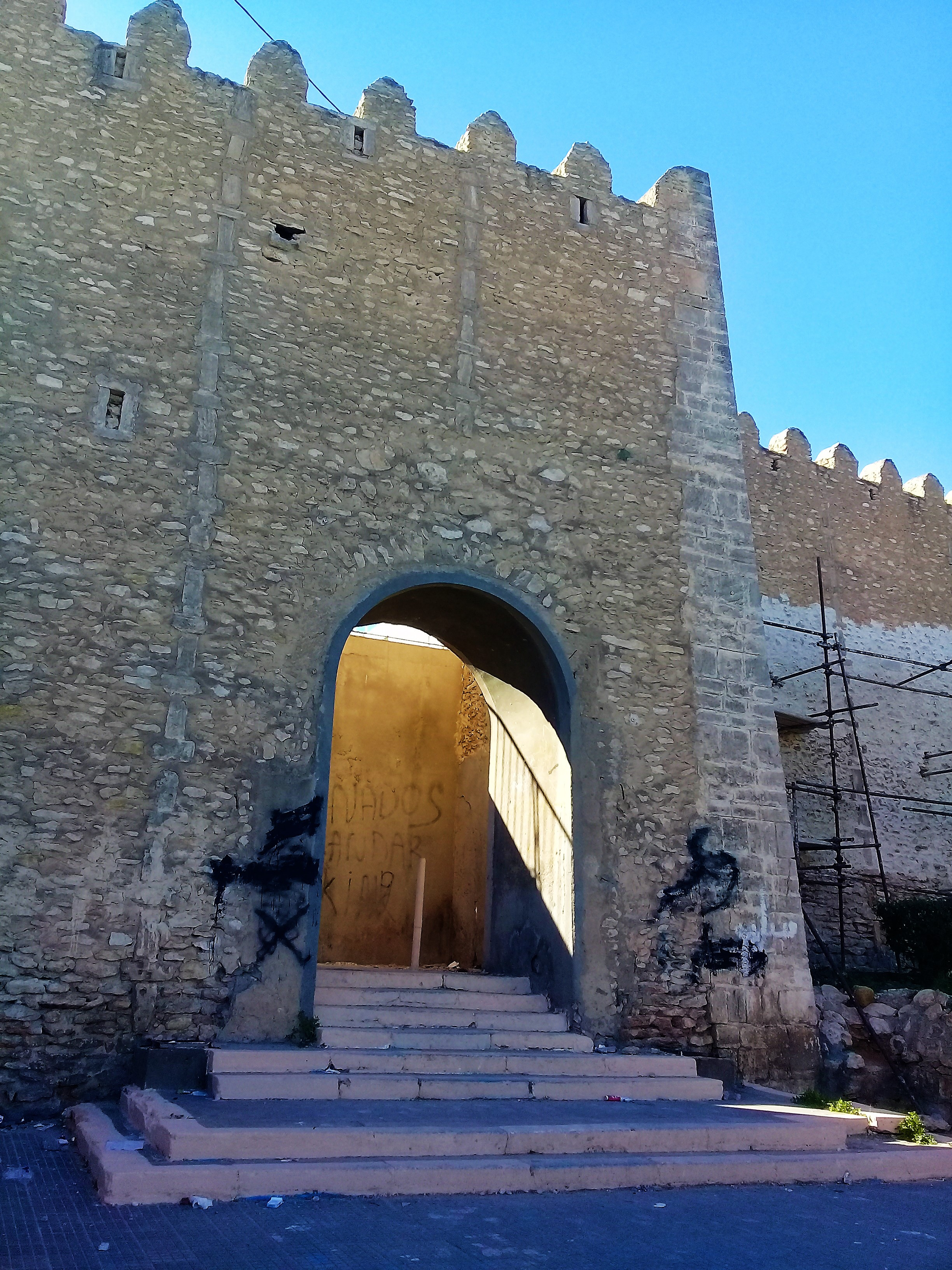
Bab Charki

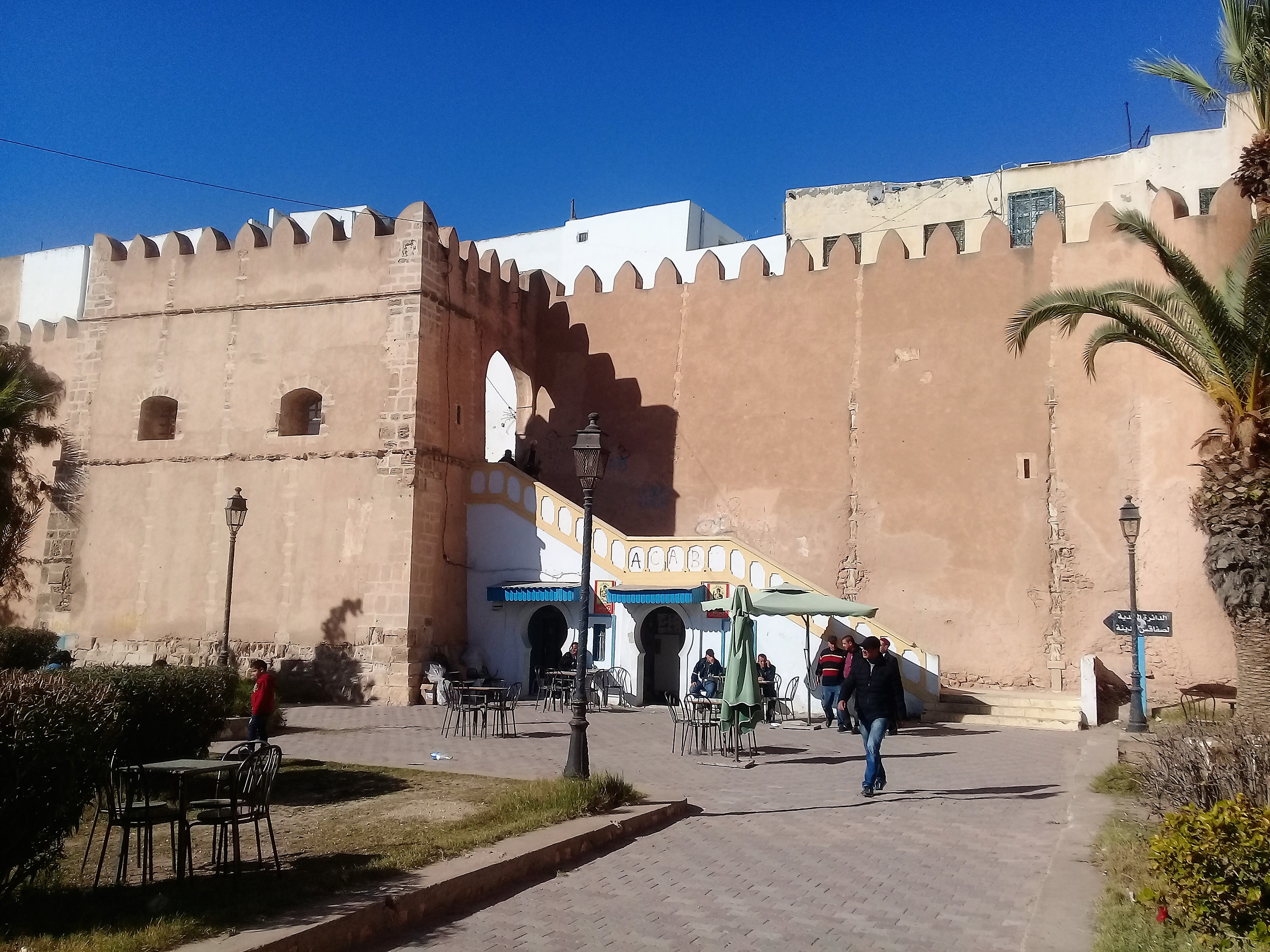
Bab Borj Ennar

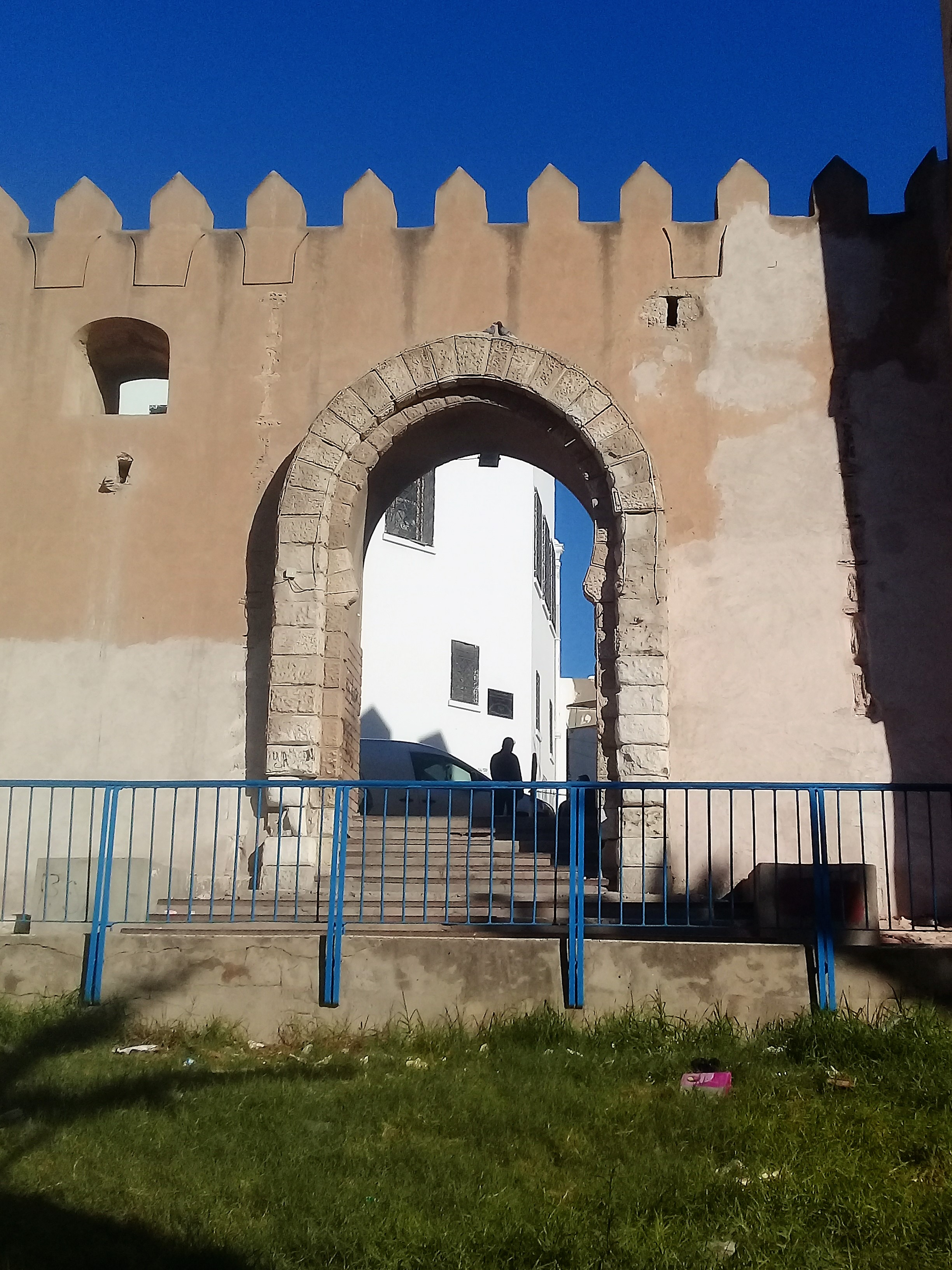
Bab Gharbi
