= Borj El Ksar =

Ancient fortification in Sfax, Tunisia

Borj El Ksar (Arabic: برج القصر) is one of the fortifications of the medina of Sfax.

== Location ==
The monument is located in the north-west corner of the medina, the other angles being occupied by the kasbah, Borj Ennar and Borj Masouda. It can be reached through to Bab El Ksar.Feskiet El Fendri is located near to the borj.

== History ==
Historians suggest that it was built between the 11th and 12th centuries. The presence of arches very similar to those of the Great Mosque, the Kasbah and the entrance of fondouk El Haddadine supports this hypothesis.

== Architecture ==
The fort has three towers: two at the northern face and one at the western one. They are connected by allies and courtyards that have disappeared because of illegal constructions within the medina. It is centered on a north-west / south-east main street where, at the southern end, is a small capped alley called Sbat El Ksar. The latter has two doors separated by a courtyard and which, closed, isolate Borj El Ksar from the rest of the medina.
