= Sidi Elyes Mosque =

Mosque in Sfax, Tunisia

- جامع سيدي إلياس
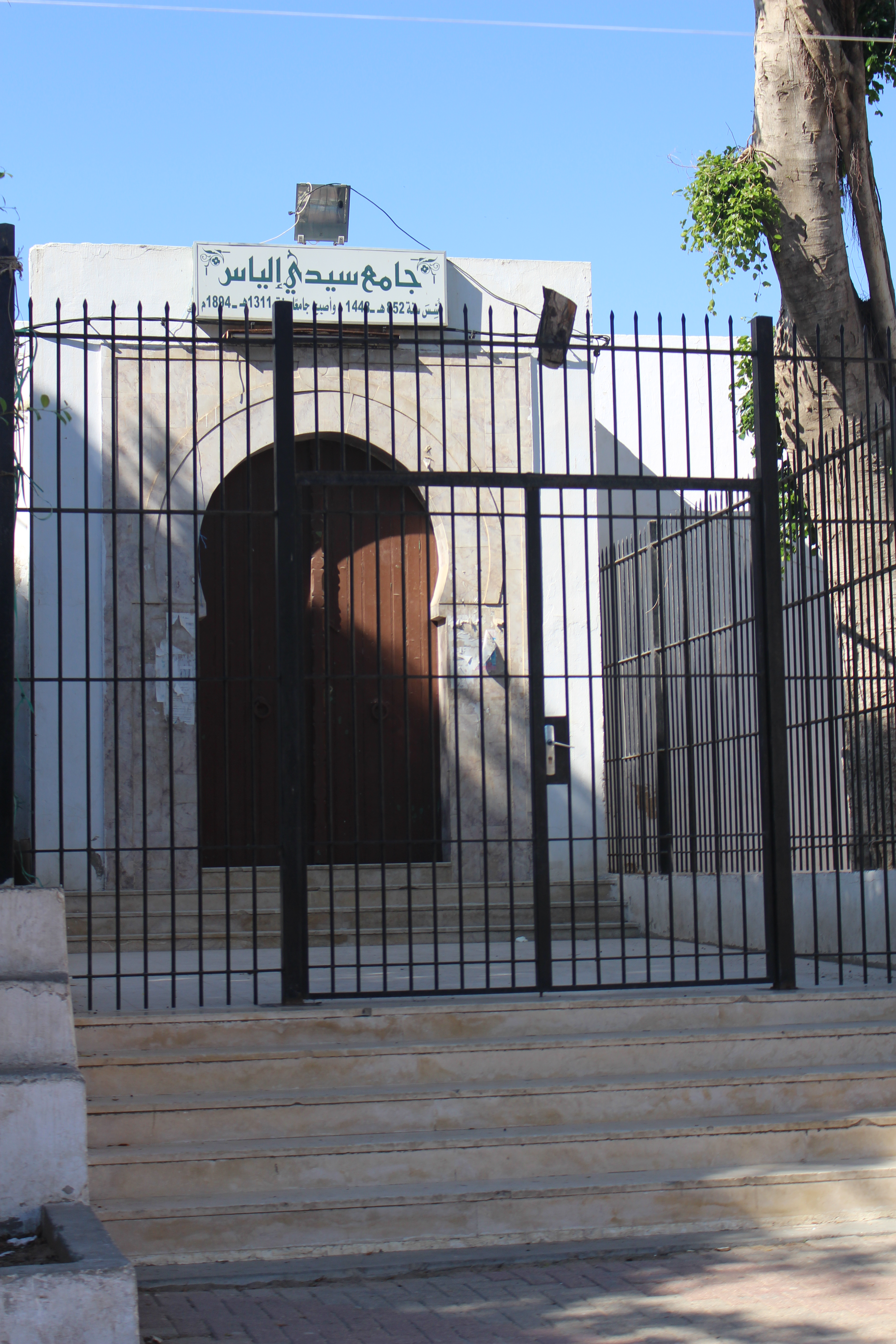

- Location within Tunisia

Religion
- Affiliation: Islam

Location
- Location: Sfax, Tunisia
- Interactive map of Sidi Elyes Mosque
- Coordinates: 34°44′02.0″N 10°45′32.5″E

Architecture
- Type: mosque

The Sidi Elyes Mosque (Arabic: جامع سيدي إلياس) is one of the most important and oldest mosques of the medina of Sfax, Tunisia.

== Localisation ==
The mosque is located in the "Houmet Al Hisar" (literally the quarter of the embargo in Arabic), also known as "Haret el Sonnaa" or the quarter of the workers according to Mahmoud Megdiche. This residential quarter is located in the south-western part of the Medina. It is limited on the south by the main Kasbah's square, on the west by Borj El Ksar street, on the north by Amilcar Street and on the east side by Sidi Abbes street. The neighborhood where the mosque is located is considered one of the most important districts of the medina as it is the closest to the kasbah, which gave it an important economic role. Moreover, most artisans of the medina have been living there for decades.

== History ==
Unfortunately, the history of this monument is not well documented. According to an inscription found at the southern facade of his minaret, it was restored during the reign of the Hafsid prince Abu Omar Othman (1485–1488), proof of its existence in the 15th century. The only second trace on its history is found in the list of religious monuments set by students of the military school of Bardo in 1857.

During the 20th century, the Sidi Elyes mosque underwent 3 renovation interventions in 1960, 1969 and 1985. During the works of 1969, columns were brought back from the Zied Palace to strengthen the structure of the mosque.

According to popular culture, the name Sidi Elyes comes from the name of a Turkish commander who was buried inside the mosque. But there is no archeological proof of this theory.

== Architecture ==
The mosque consists of a prayer room, a room for the imam and a minaret at the south-eastern corner. It is surrounded by three patios on the east, north and south sides.

The main entrance is on the east side that opens onto Sidi Abbès Street. It is distinguished by its typical Ottoman style. The door is 3 meters long and 2.5 meters wide. It gives access to the east side patio that runs the full width of the mosque (30 meters).

The minaret represents the oldest part of the mosque. It has a square shape with 3 meters at each side and about 14 meters high. It consists of two parts: the base of 10.5 meters, and a hexagonal part of 2.8 meters surmounted by a dome.
