= Souk El Hboub =

Souk El Hboub ( Arabic : سوق الحبوب ) is one of the oldest souks of the medina of Sfax, more specifically the souks of Bab Jebli.

== History ==
Originally, the souk was called the Souk of Food and later on it was changed to the Souk of Blessings before it was decided that it should be called Souk El Hboub.

The oldest part of the souk is Ahmed Bey's yard which is situated in the east of the medina, and has the Sallemi path or the 'Leader's path' as its branches, while it is boarded from the west by an alley called 'Zuqaq el Marr'.

There were also some warehouses in the souk for selling grains, and right in its center, the seller sets up El Msab.

El Msab is considered as a funnel basically, that has a huge size and is made out of wood. It is put over some branches of wood called Coffins.

== Localization ==
Souk El Hboub has kept its architecture and its main role until the late nineteenth century when its location was changed in several phases: first, it was moved out of the medina next to the southern fence where the artistic institute was located. Then, it took over the spot of Souk El Mahsoulat. Afterwards, it was moved next to the northern part of the mure. Currently, Souk El Hboub is located in the eastern part of Sfax at the beginning of Mahdia Road.
