= Souk El Najjarine =

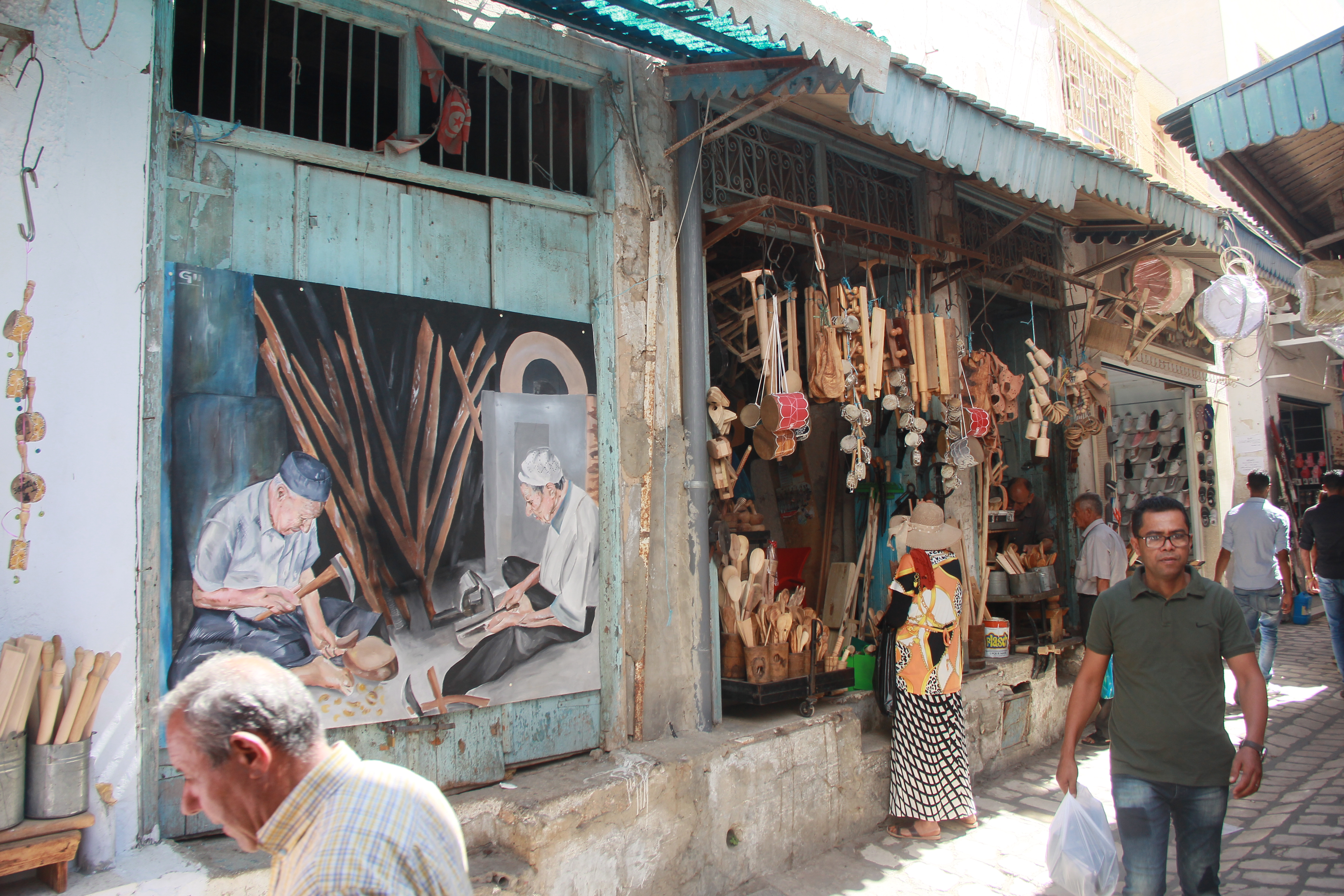
Souk El Najjarine

Souk El Najjarine (Arabic: سوق النجارين) or the carpenters market is one of the souks of the Medina of Sfax, Tunisia.

== Localization ==
The souk was located in the intersection between Souk El Haddadine and Nahj El Bey (or Zuqaq El Marr, the current Mongi Slim Street), near Bab Nahj El Bey.

== Activity ==
As its name indicates, this market is specialized in the carpentry craft. But what distinguishes the carpenters of Souk El Najjarine is that they use only the olive trees wood for their products. That is why they are still known and kept their work successfully even with all the new technologies arrival to the city.
