= Bab Jebli Jedid =

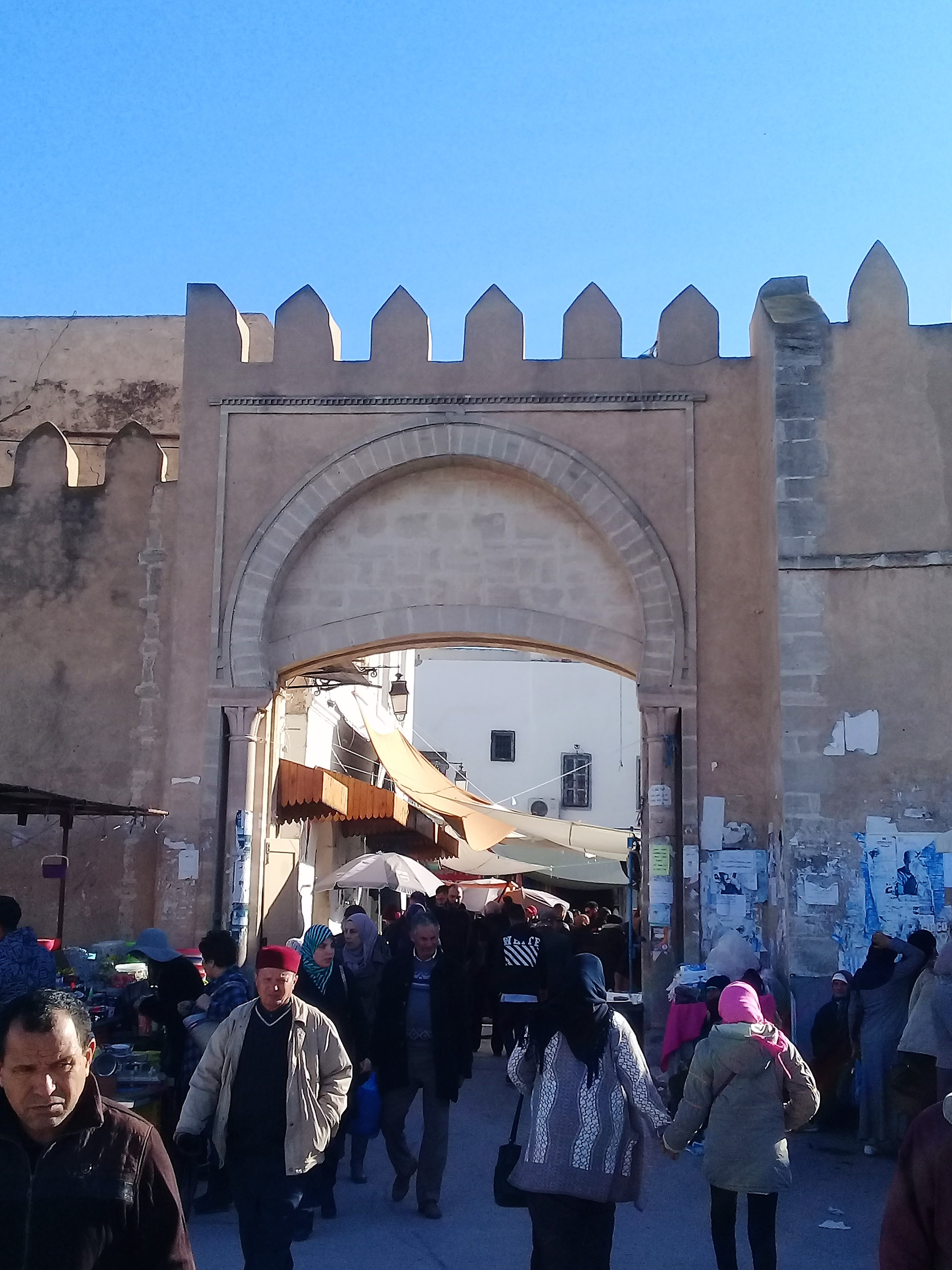
Bab Jebli Jedid

Bab Jebli Jedid (Arabic: باب الجبلي الجديد), also known as Bab Jallouli (Arabic: باب الجلولي) is one of the gates of the Medina of Sfax located in the center of the northern facade of its walls, between Bab Jebli and Bab El Ksar.

This gate was built during the 20th century under the rule of the caid Mohamed Sadok El Jallouli. After his death in 1910, the door got its founder's name in order to commemorate it. Bab Jebli Jedid gives access from the outer entrance to the central bus stations.

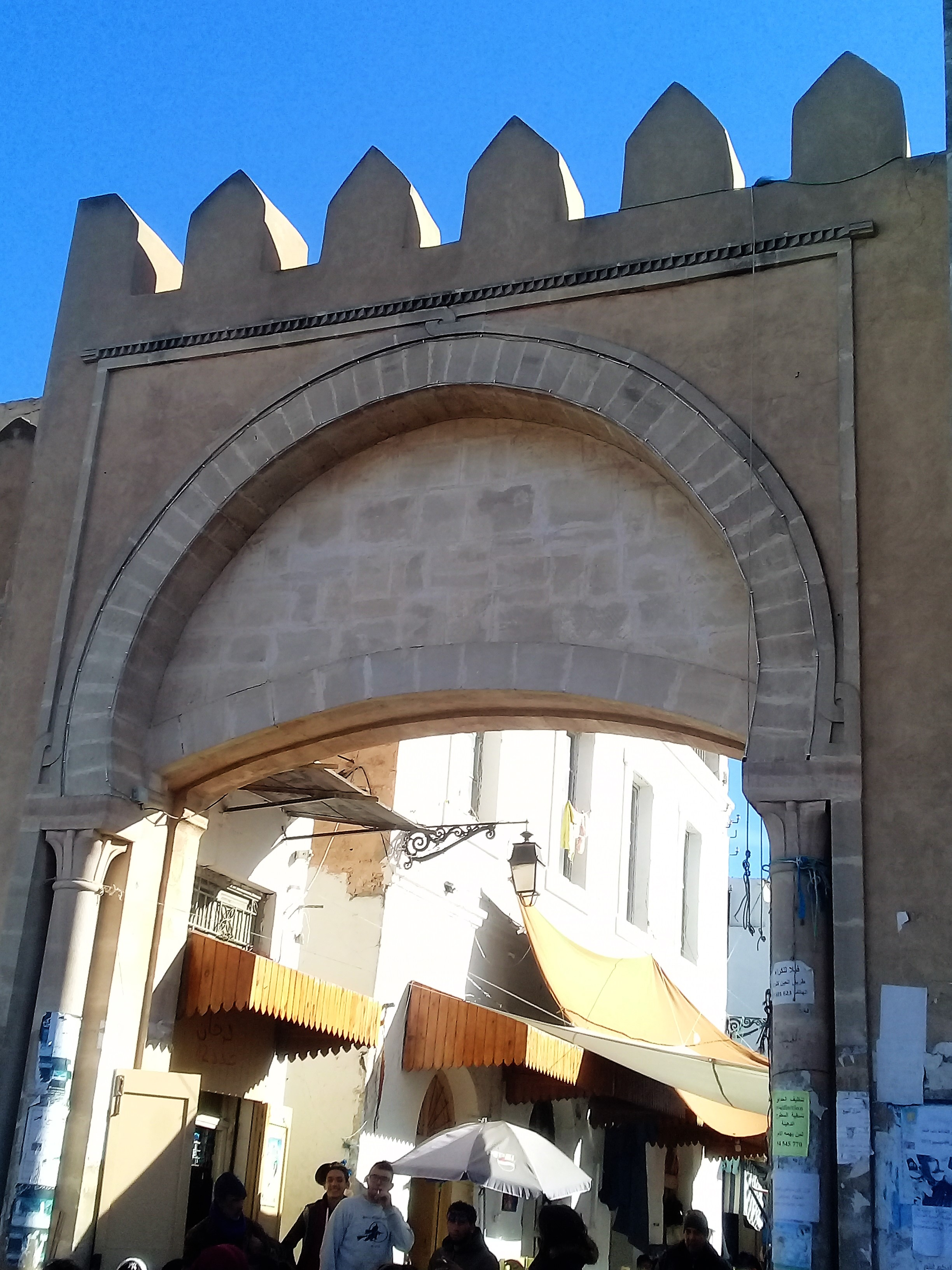
The arche of Bab Jallouli

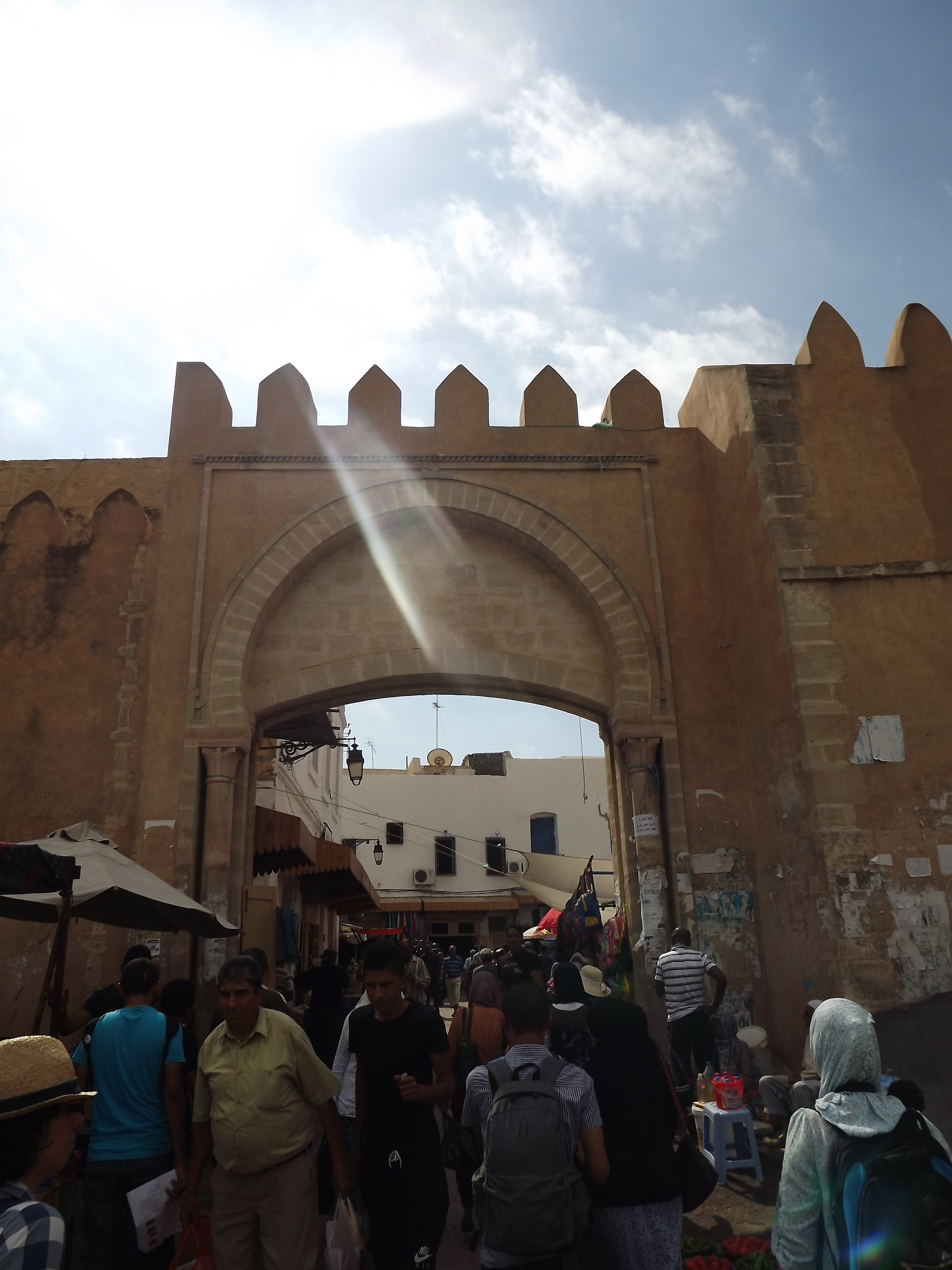
Passengers and merchants at the entrance of the medina

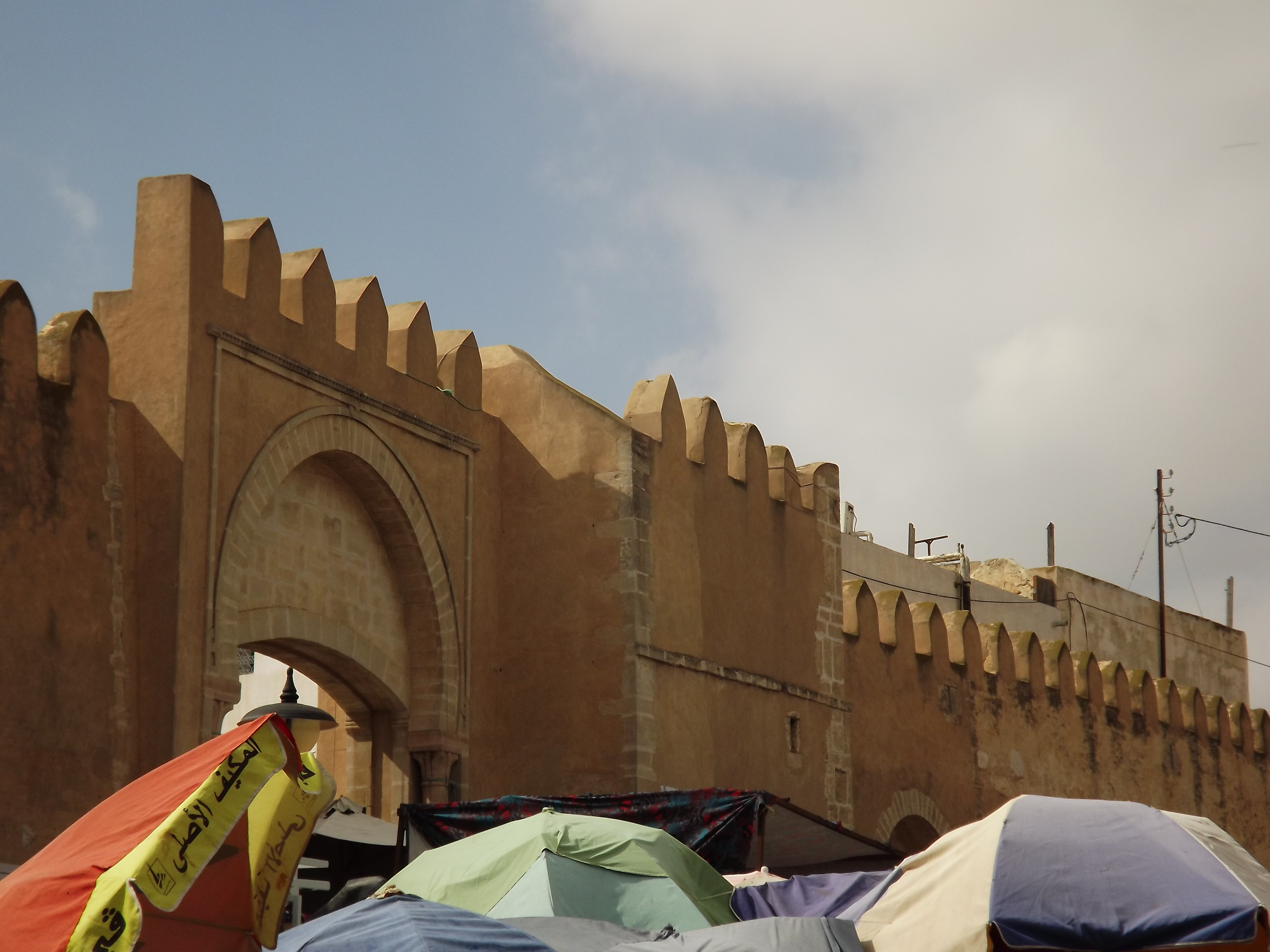
The northern facade of the medina of Sfax
