= Bab El Ksar =

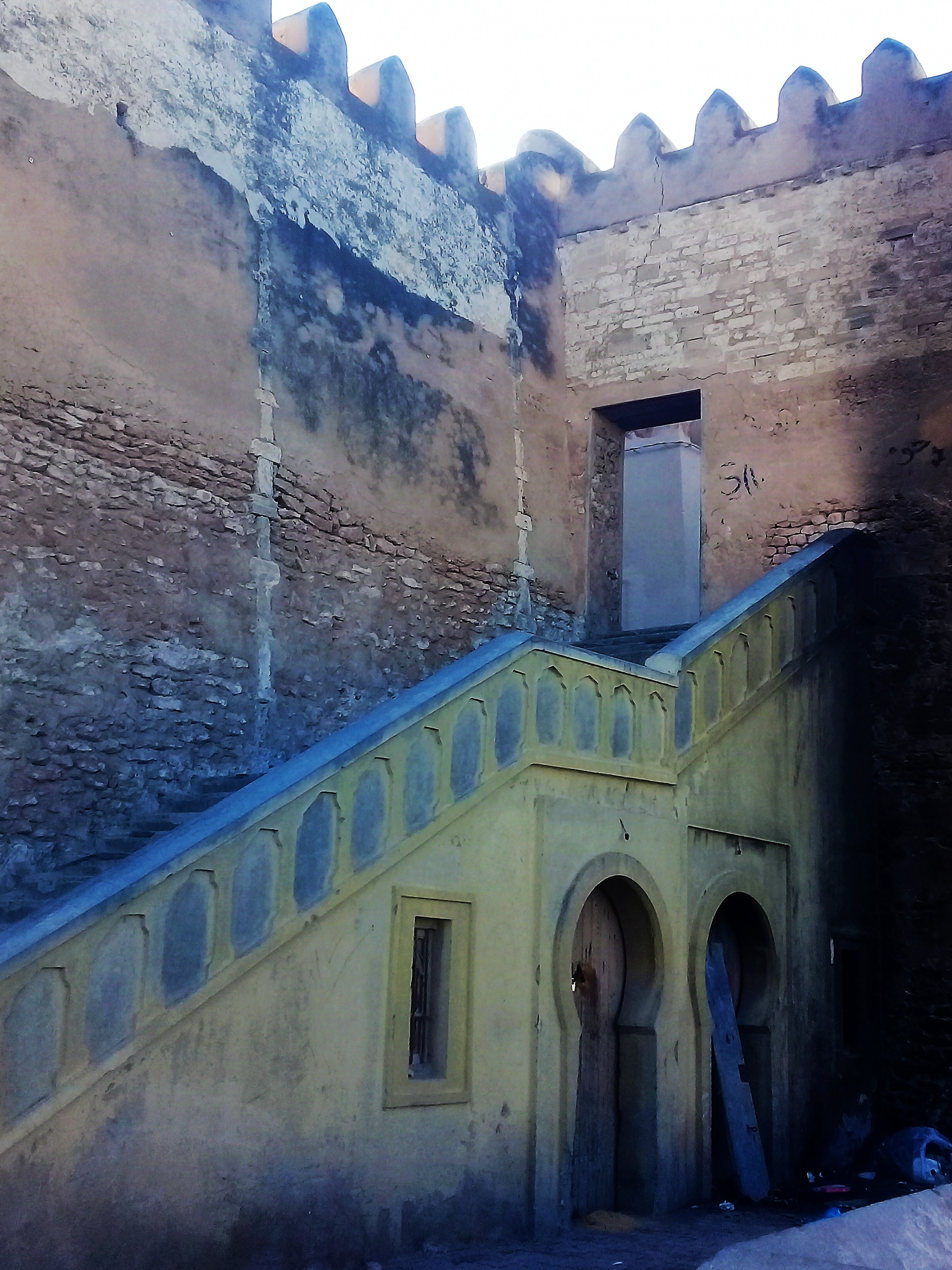
Bab El Ksar

Bab El Ksar (Arabic: باب القصر) is one of the gates of the medina of Sfax, located in the west of the northern face of the fence and giving access to Borj El Ksar, a defensive device occupying the north-west corner of the enclosure of the medina.

Knowing that the topography of this site is slightly uneven, we reach this opening through a staircase that leads to the bus station of Bab Jebli and Faskiet El Fendri, a water cistern of Aghlabid origins next to the wall of Borj El Ksar.

This door is part of series of openings that were done at the beginning of the 20th century (with Bab Jebli Jedid and Bab Nahj El Bey) in order to decongest the medina and promote the exchange with the external areas.

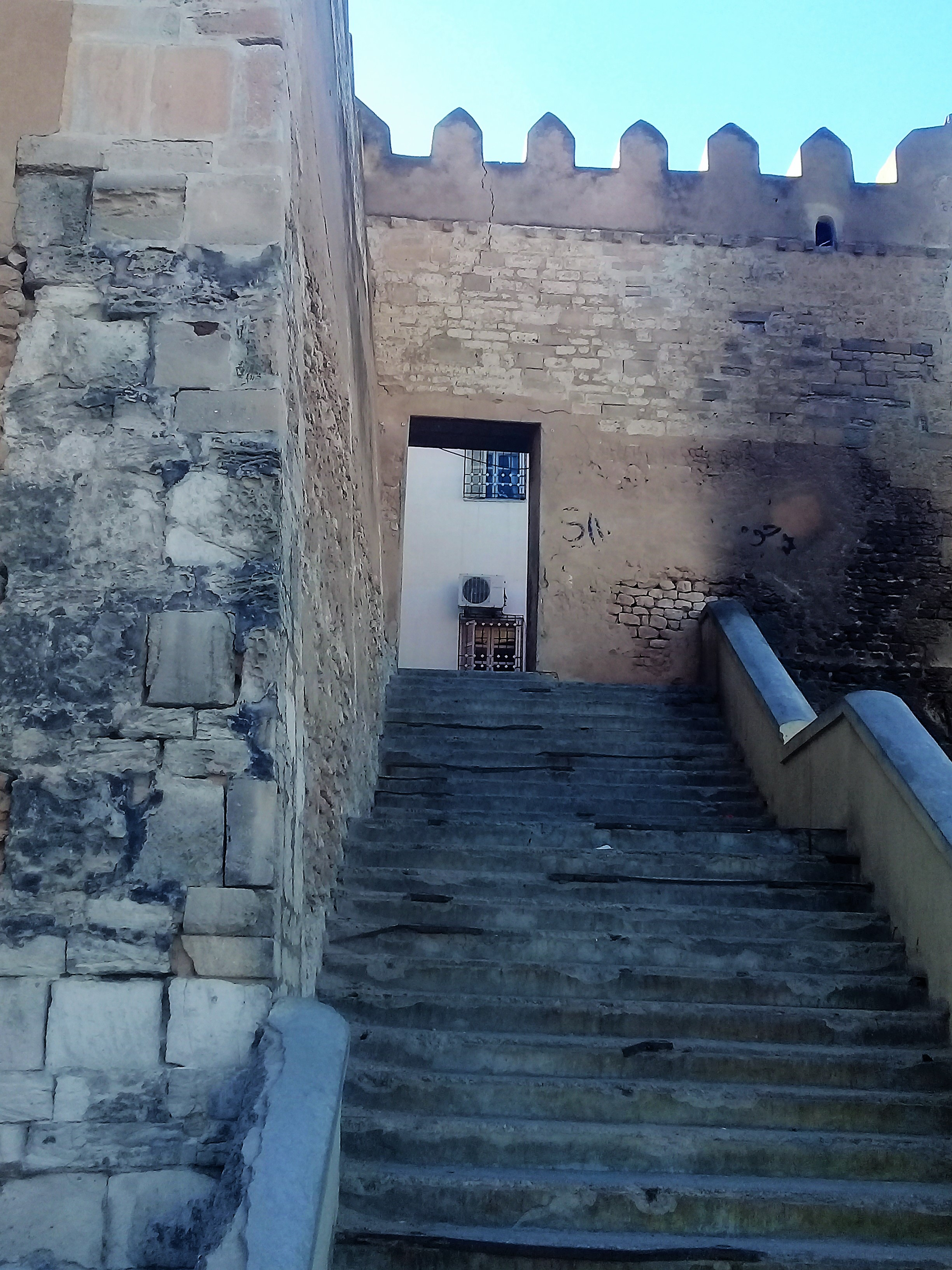

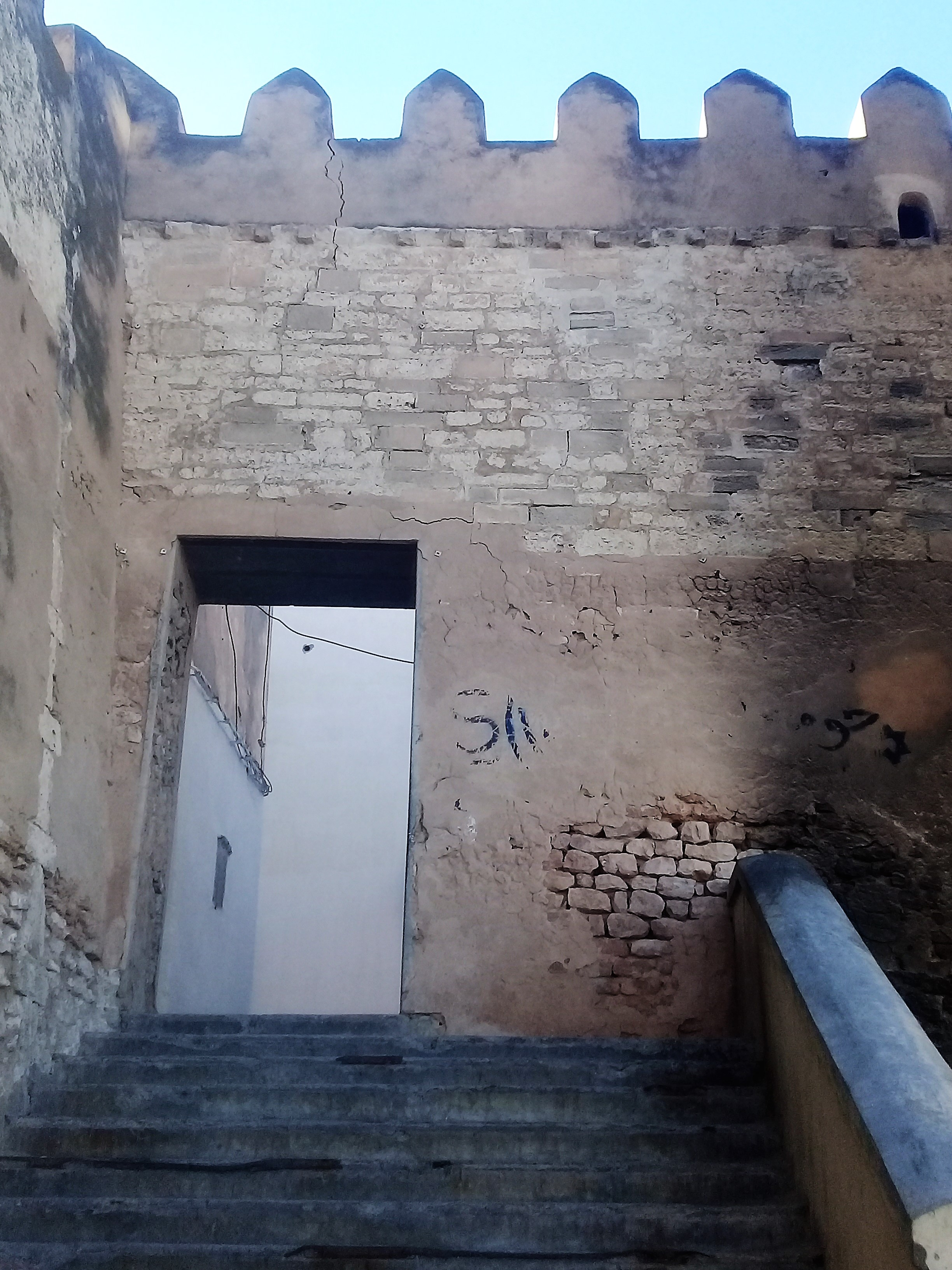
