= Borj Masouda =

Ancient fortification in Sfax, Tunisia

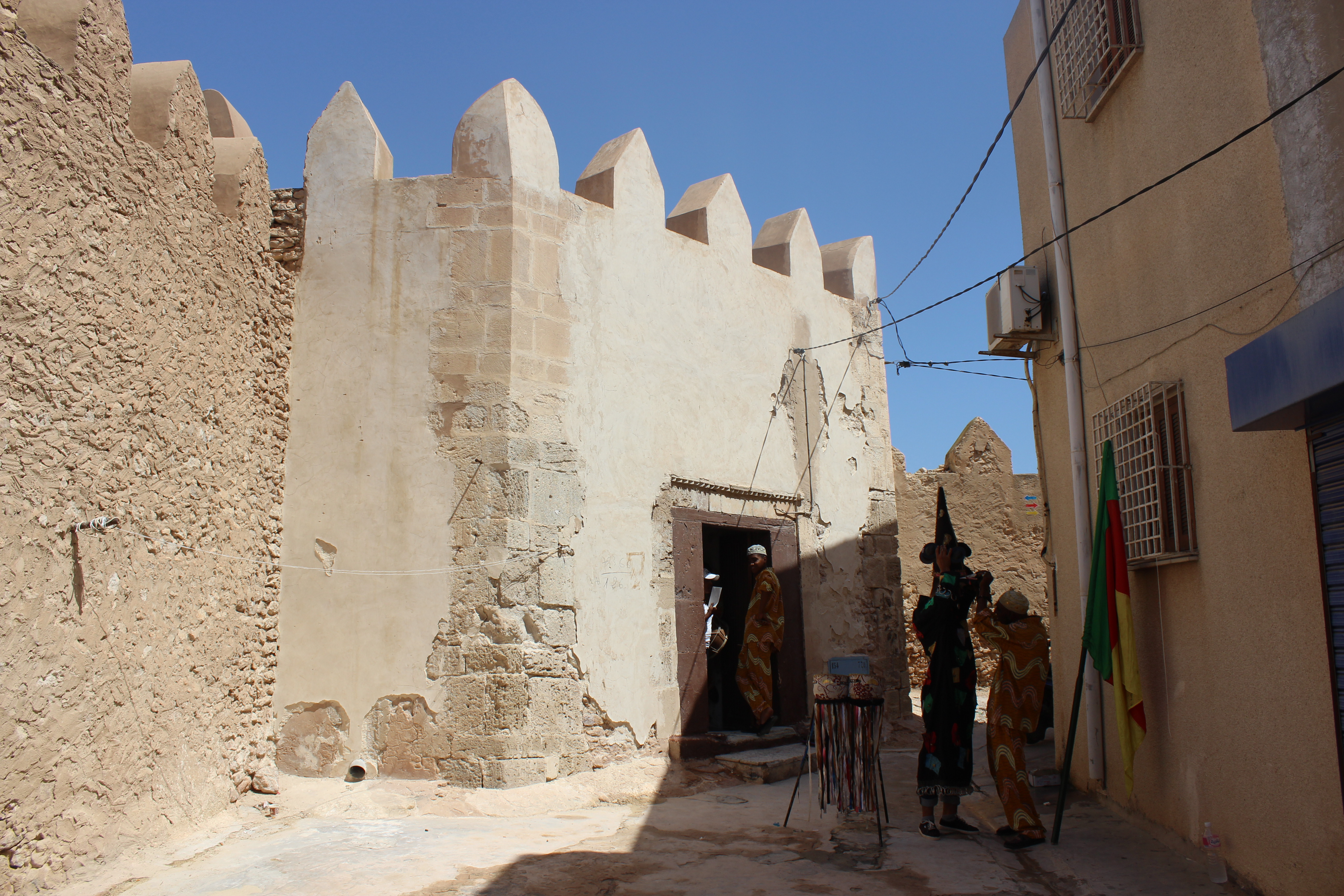
Borj Masouda in 2018

Borj Masouda (arabic : برج مسعودة) or Borj Lella Masouda Essamra (برج للا مسعودة السمراء) is one of the main four fortifications of the medina of Sfax.

== Location and etymology ==
The fort is located at the northeast corner of the medina, near Bab Charki. It owes its name to Masouda Essamra, a black woman who sheltered the fort and who dedicated her life to the service of the black community of Sfax.

== History ==
According to Mahmoud Megdiche, the fort takes its name from a black woman who lived in Sfax and who dedicated her life to helping the inhabitants of the city and the protection of the fort. It is very difficult to specify the date of its construction, but it appears in the Louis Salvador illustrations of Habsburg-Lorraine in 1789. In addition, the nature of its columns suggests that it was built before the Hafsid dynasty succeeded to power. Its main role was the surveillance of the north and east facades of the medina.

In 1857, and following the orders of the Bey, a brotherhood was created within it with Sheikh El Sellami at its leader.

== Architecture ==
Borj Masouda is an octagonal tower larger than the rest of the towers of the walls. Its height exceeds four meters and each side measures 5.4 meters. It consists of two levels, the lower of which is larger. The second floor has a prayer room divided into two galleries by two columns in the direction of the qibla.

To the right of the mihrab is a small cell (maqsura) where the saint Masouda Essamra is buried.

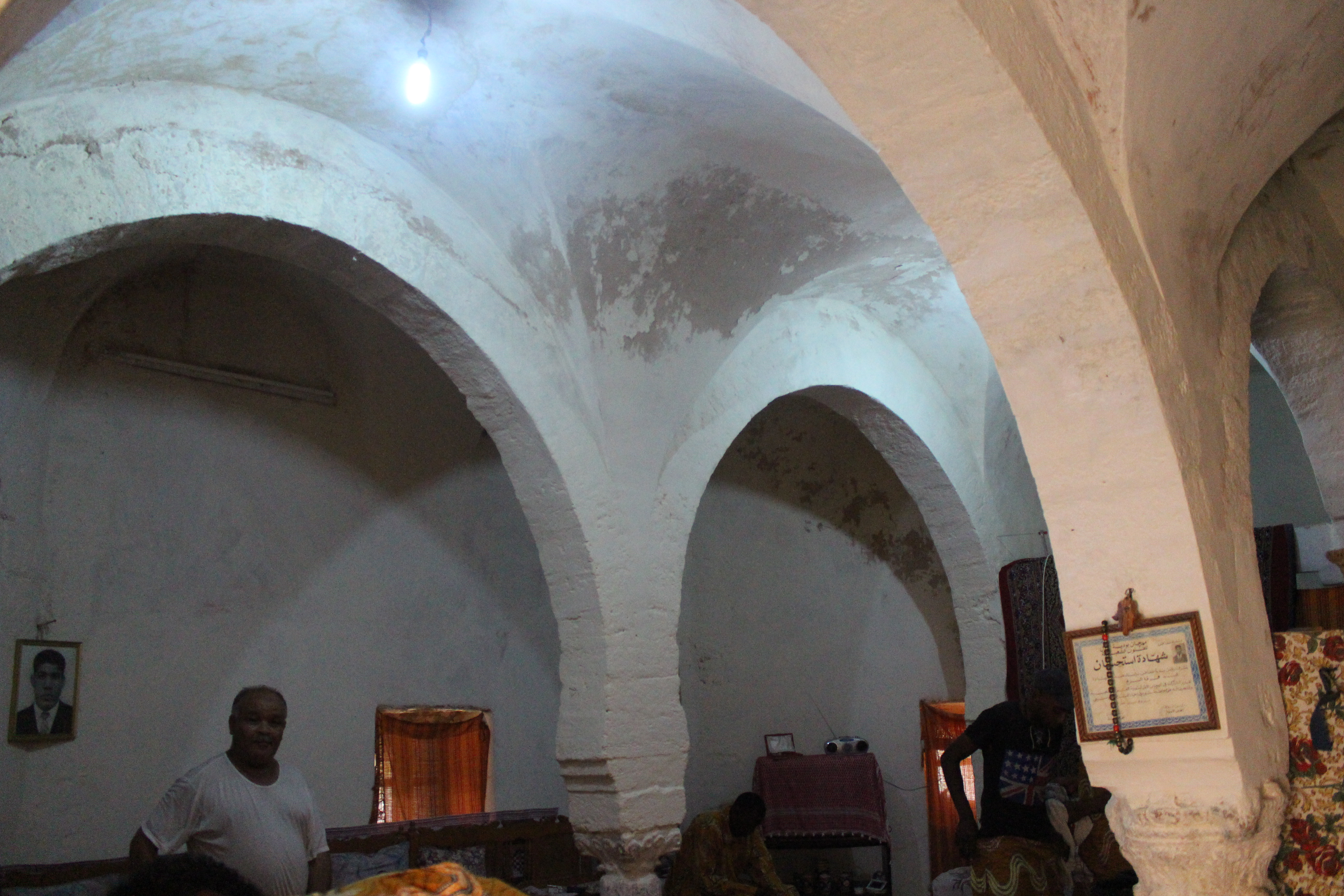
Prayer room

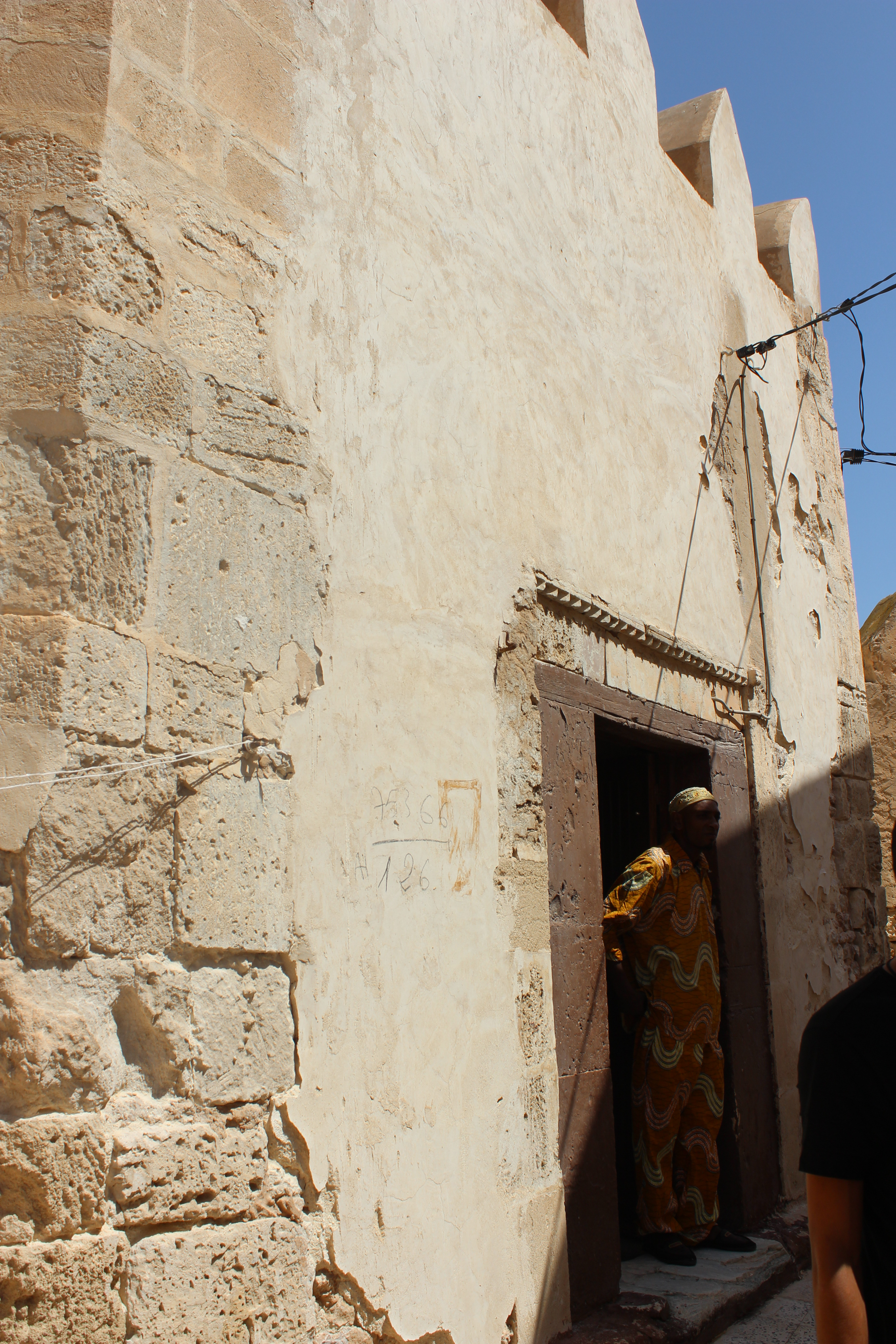
Entrance

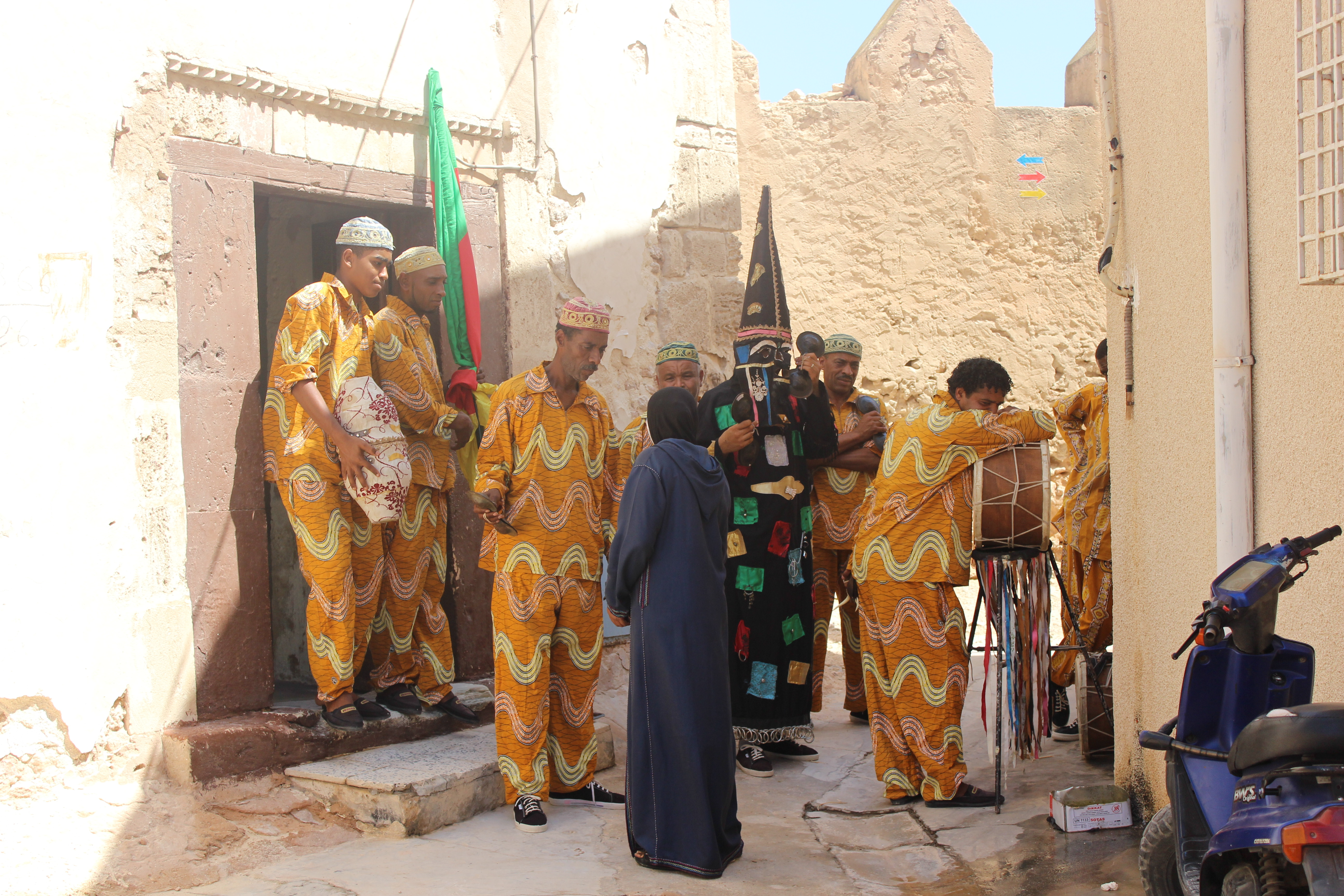
A stambali show in front of the monument
