= Fondouk El Haddadine =

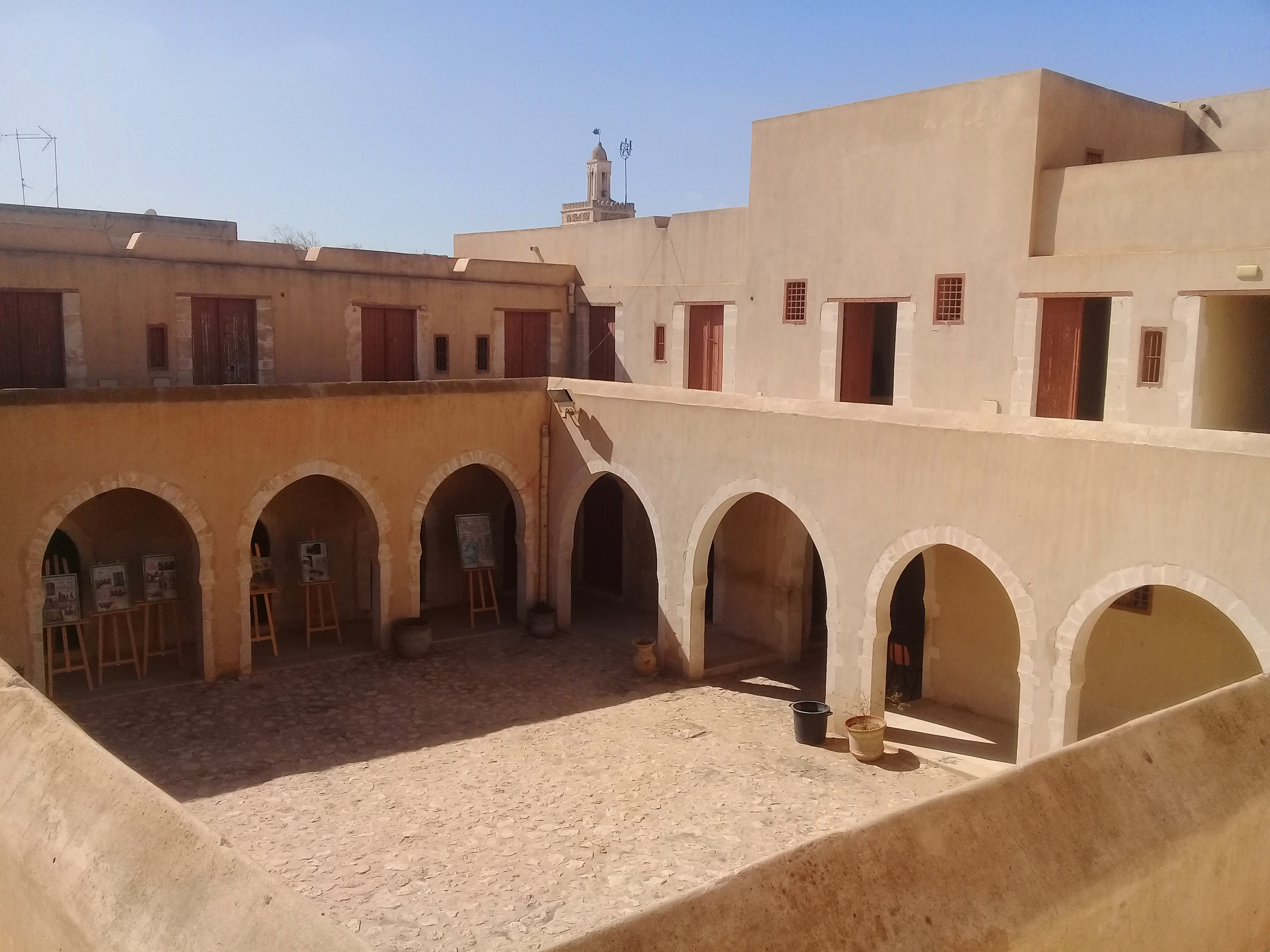
Fondouk El Haddadine

Fondouk El Haddadine (arabic : فندق الحدادين) or the blacksmiths' fondouk, is an old fondouk (or hotel) in the medina of Sfax located near Bab Jebli.

It represents one of its most important monuments.

== Localization ==
The fondouk is located in Souk El Haddadine, from which it drew its name, near Bab Jebli and the former caravan resort of which it represents the unique remaining witness. It shows the importance of the city of Sfax during the medieval period as a station or relay for caravans and traders.

== History ==
The fondouk El Haddadine was built in the 9th century, under the rule of the Hafsid dynasty. It witnessed a first restoration during the 18th century.

For centuries, this fondouk hosted travelers, their goods and animals. At the beginning of the 20th century, with the development of maritime trade and means of transport in Sfax, the caravan trade was affected. And as a way to overcome the situation, the rooms of the fondouk were transformed into workshops for the medina's ironworkers.

In 2006, the fondouk underwent a second restoration at a total cost of 660,000 Tunisian dinars by the municipality of Sfax with the support of the Ministry of Tourism, the International Association of Francophone Cities and the National Heritage Institute.

On 16 June 2012, following the signing of an agreement between the municipality and the Ministry of Culture, the monument became a property of the ministry. A year later, on 20 April 2013, the building opened its doors as a cultural center that regularly hosts various events (International Day of the Francophonie in Tunisia, Ramadan evenings of the Medina Festival, etc.).

In 2016, and as Sfax got nominated as the capital of Arab culture, a budget of 2.5 million dinars was allocated to the restoration of the madrasa Hussainiya and the readjustment of fondouk El Haddadine into a craft center.

== Architecture ==
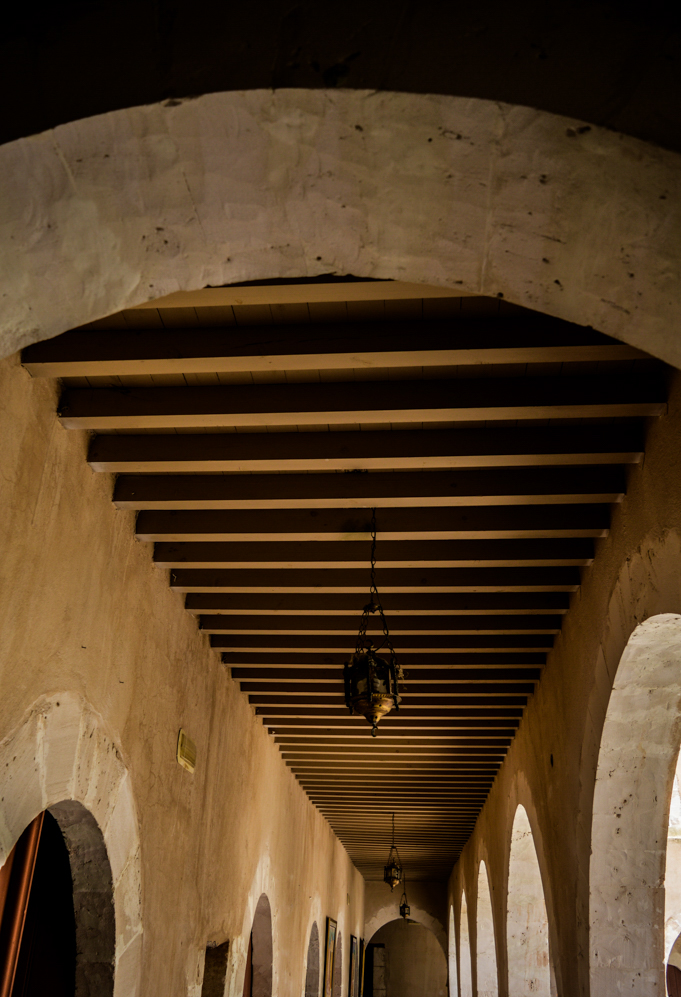
Seiling of the alley

The entrance of the fondouk (or its vestibule) is a hallway with a large wooden door framed by a stone device. Laterally, visit can find built benches and stairs on the left that lead to the first floor. It gives access to a large open-air patio surrounded by sandstone porticos, mounted on limestone pillars. These galleries open on cells covered with semicircular vaults. According to historians, these rooms were reserved for the animals of travelers and their goods.

The fondouk has a second smaller court, called fnidqa (small fondouk), that served as a store for camels and other pack animals.

The first floor is divided into 25 rooms that for centuries hosted travelers, merchants and pilgrims.

With its cut stones, pointed arches and exposed joists, fondouk El Haddadine represents a good example of traditional masonry based on local materials.
