= Bab Gharbi =

Medina gate in Sfax, Tunisia

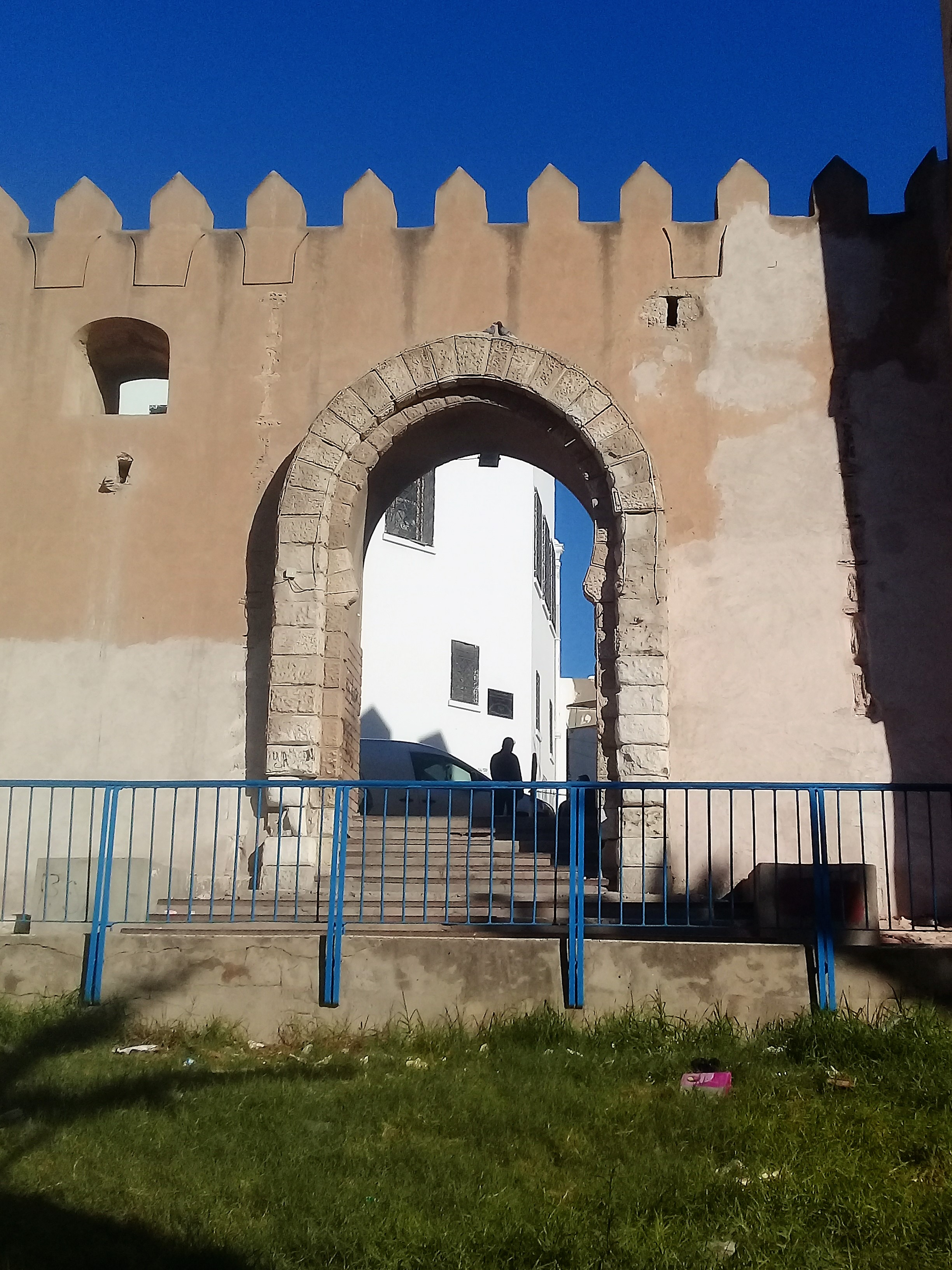
Bab Gharbi

Bab Gharbi or the Western Gate in Arabic (الباب الغربي) is one of the gates of the medina of Sfax. It is located in middle of the western front of the medina fence, next to Cheikh Mansour Hajr Rabat (which became a Primary School). It opens on Picville neighborhood, through the 18th of January Avenue.

This gate was opened in 1936 (1355 Hejri) in order to decongest the medina and promote the exchange with the external areas. Sfax municipality restored it in 1960 and built a new entrance directed to the north just next to the old one which is directed to the west.

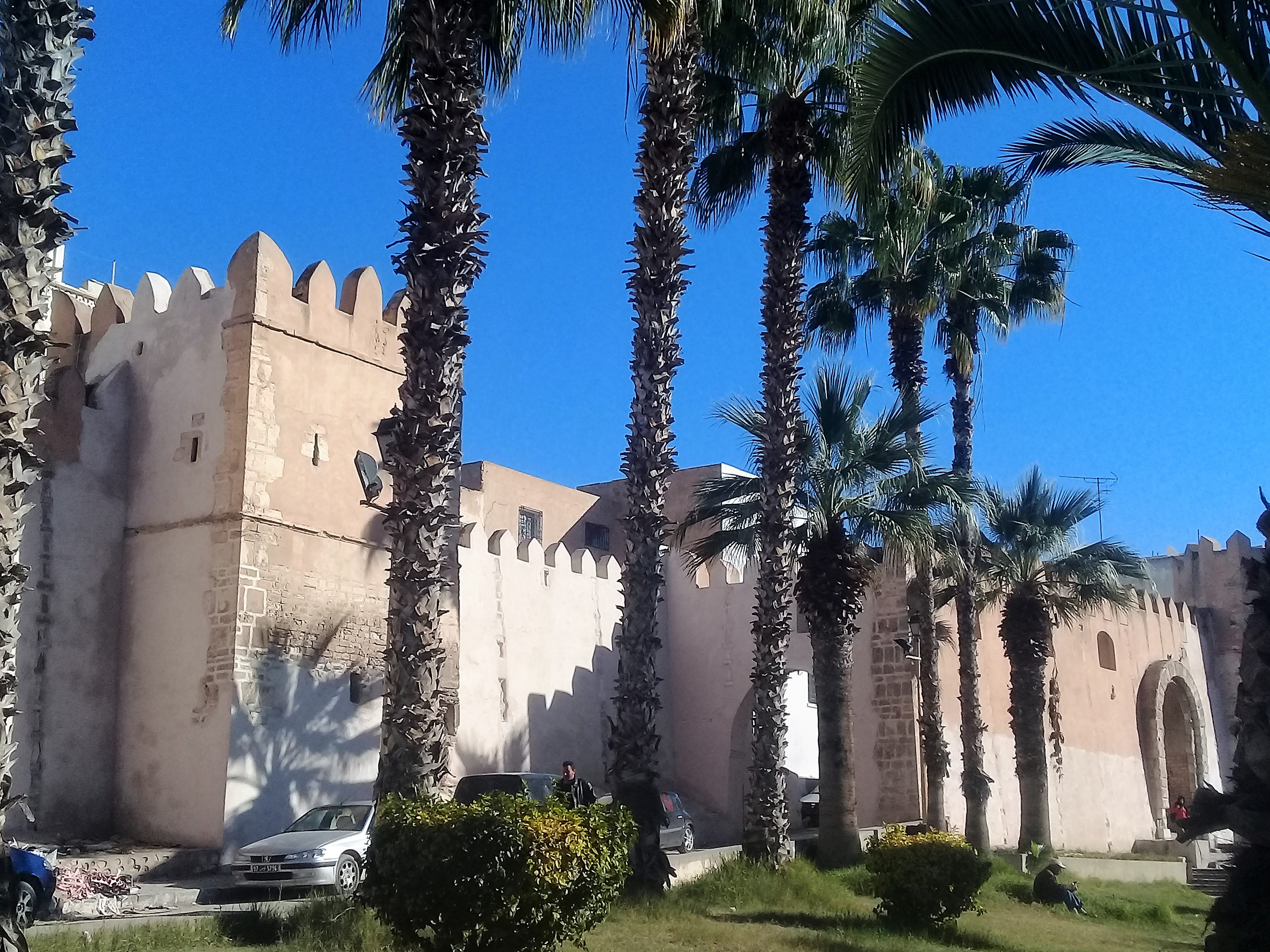

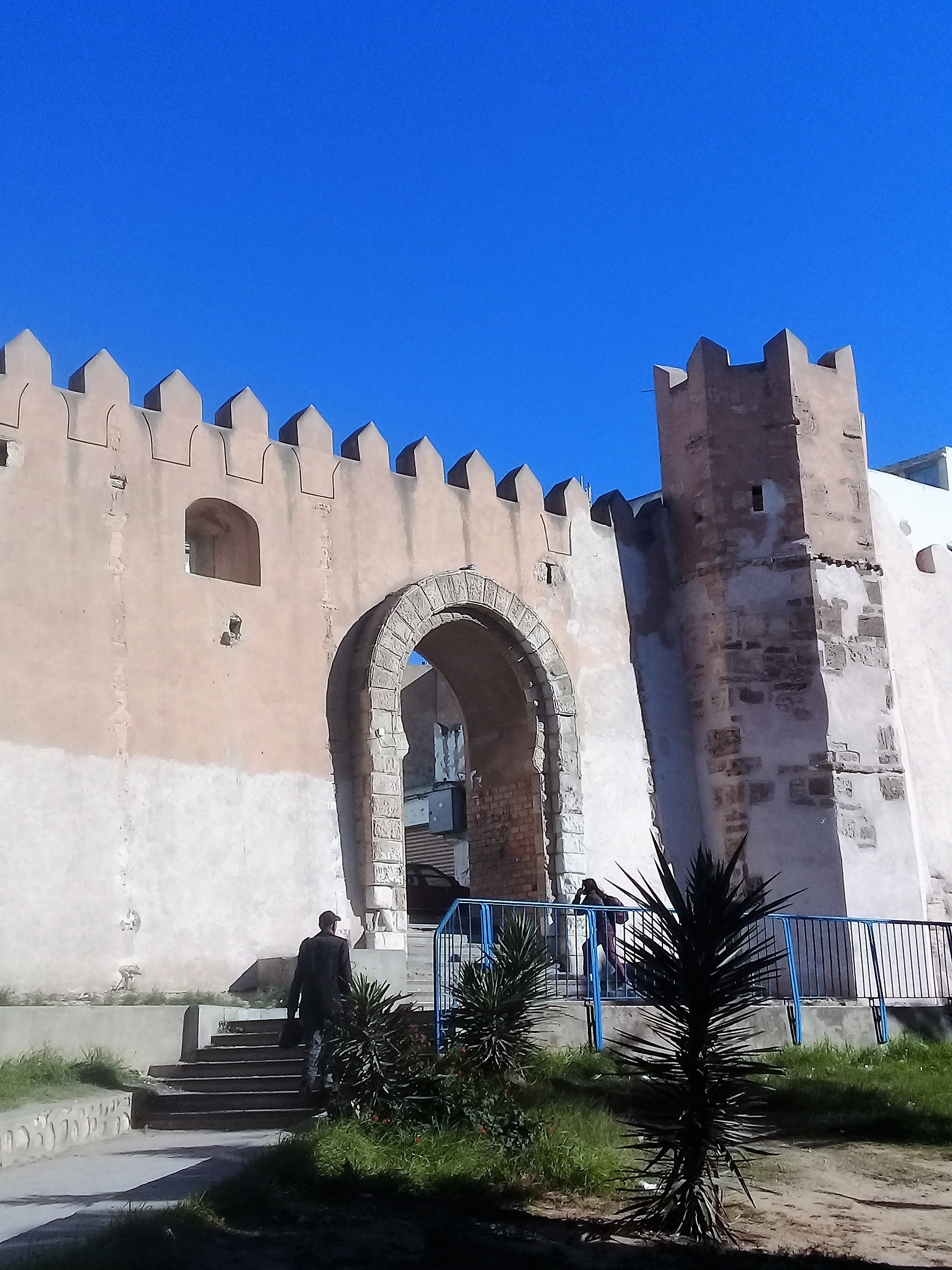
