= Bab Charki =

Coordinates: 34.73748°N 10.76362°E

Bab Charki or the Eastern Gate in Arabic (Arabic: الباب الشرقي) is one of the gates of the medina of Sfax. This gate is located in the middle of the eastern front of the medina fence, just in front of Oran Park and the Tunisian Railways locals through the Army Boulevard.

From the inside, it gives access, by a staircase, to Driba Street which represents the east–west median axis of the medina.

The door has the shape of a semicircular arch and represents the eastern end of the median east–west axis that divides the medina longitudinally.

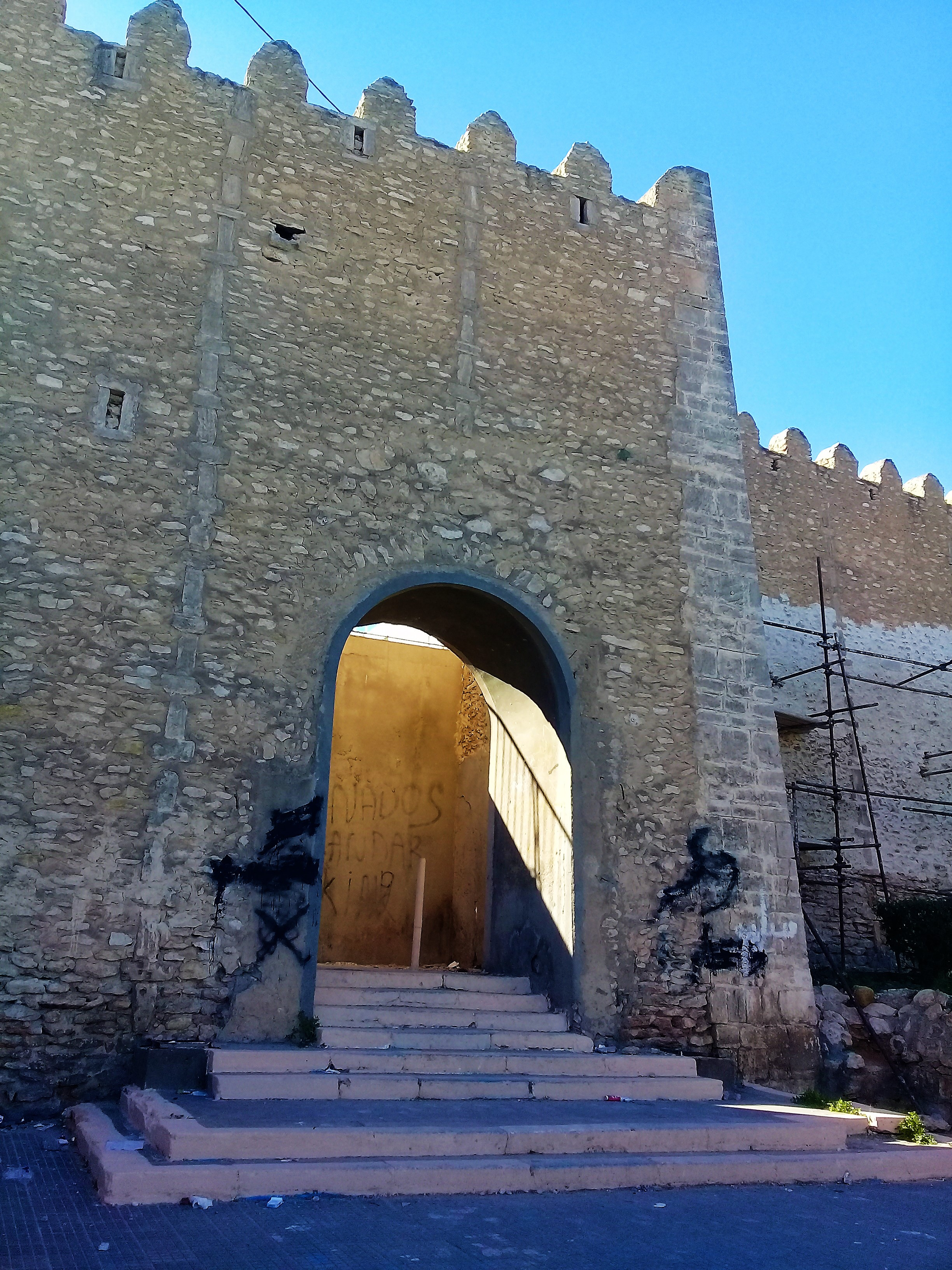
Bab Charki external view

This gate, opened in March 1965, is the last opening that was done in order to decongest the medina and promote the exchange with the external areas.

== See also ==
- Media related to Bab Charki (Sfax) at Wikimedia Commons
