= Bab Jebli =

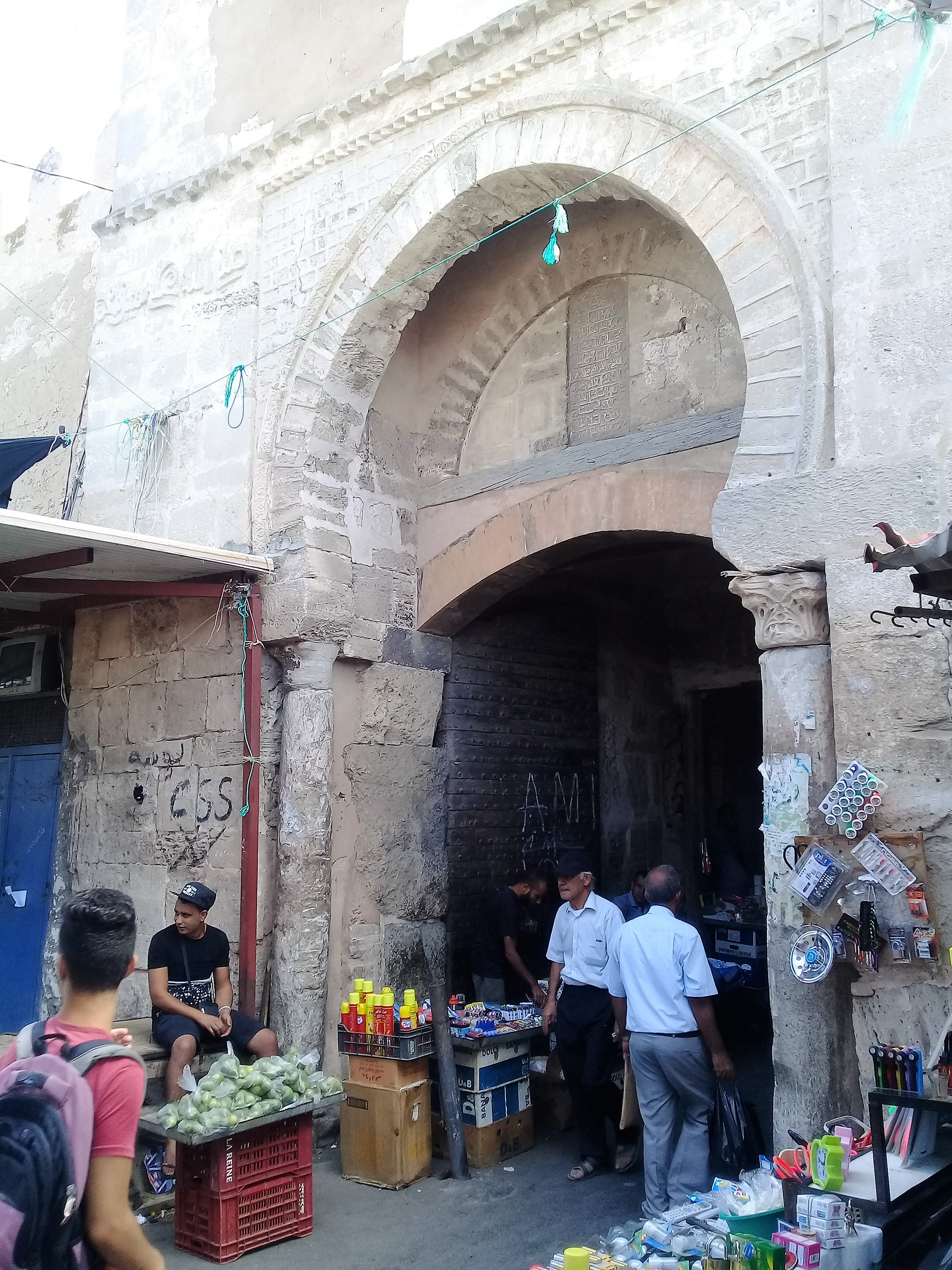
Bab Jebli

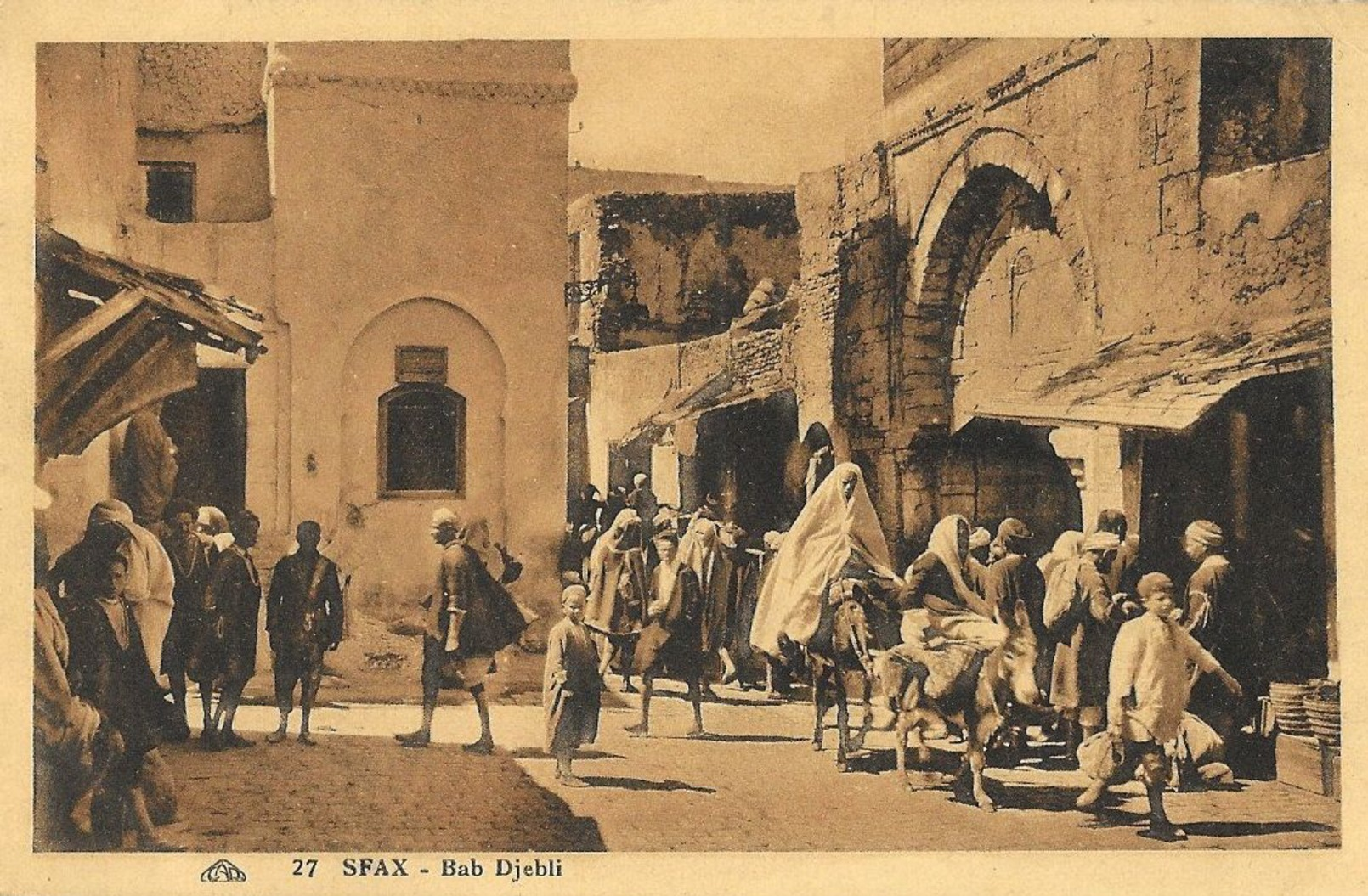

Bab Jebli (Arabic: باب الجبلي) is one of the gates of the medina of Sfax, located in the center of the northern facade of its walls between Bab Nahj El Bey and Bab Jebli Jedid. The gate gives access to a popular vegetables market and Sidi Bouchaicha Mosque inside the medina, and to a covered market in its outside.

== History ==
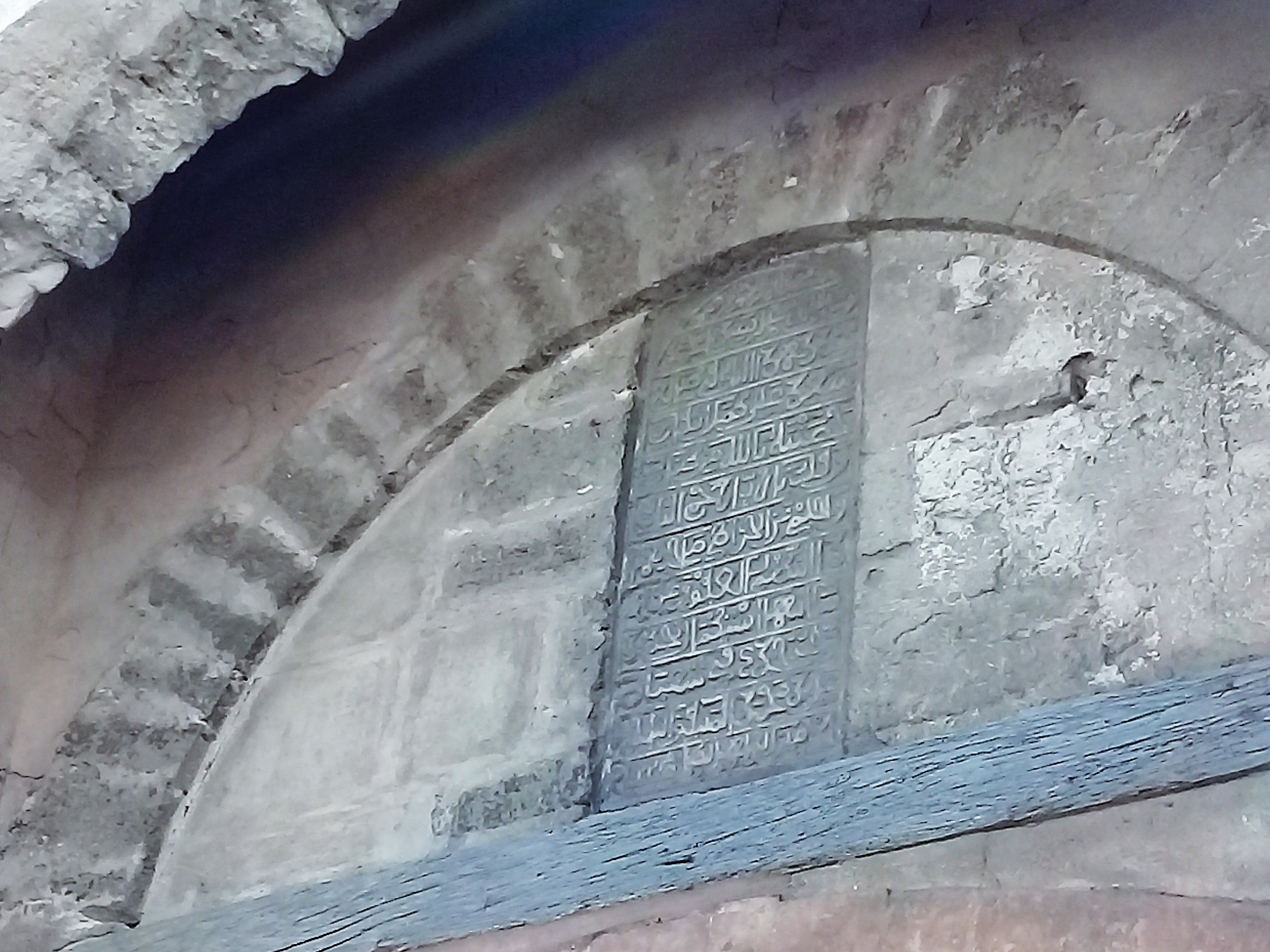
The commemorative plaque of Bab Jebli

In his book History of Sfax, Boubaker Abdelkafi suggests that Bab Jebli and Bab Diwan are the oldest and the unique entrances of the medina until the end of the 19th century. It was built during the reign of the Aghlabid dynasty that ruled Ifriqiya for the whole 9th century

According to the commemorative epigraphic plaque on top of the gate, it was restored by the Hafsid sultan Abu Faris Abd al-Aziz II in 1419. Later, between 1756 and 1809, the Husainid rulers renovated it again.

== Description ==
Bab Jebli's architecture has a typical Aghlabid style. It represents a fortified entrance built with dimension stones like all the other ifryqiyian monuments of the 9th century. It has the shape of a vaulted Skifa with only 10 meters of depth.

Between its outer and inner entrances, the lobby used to serve for guards dwellings with Borj Bab Jebli's tower on top of it.

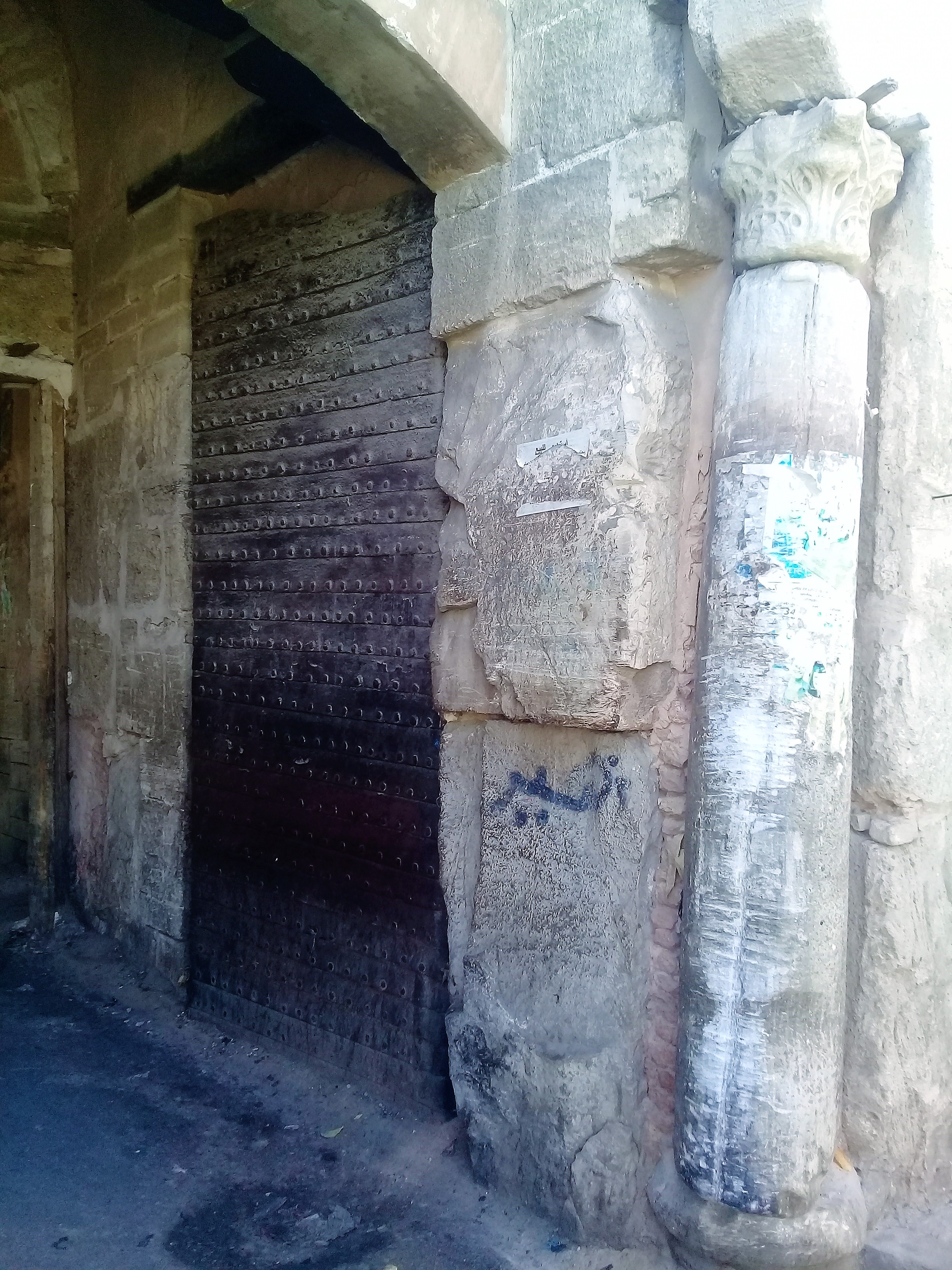
Columns of Bab Jebli

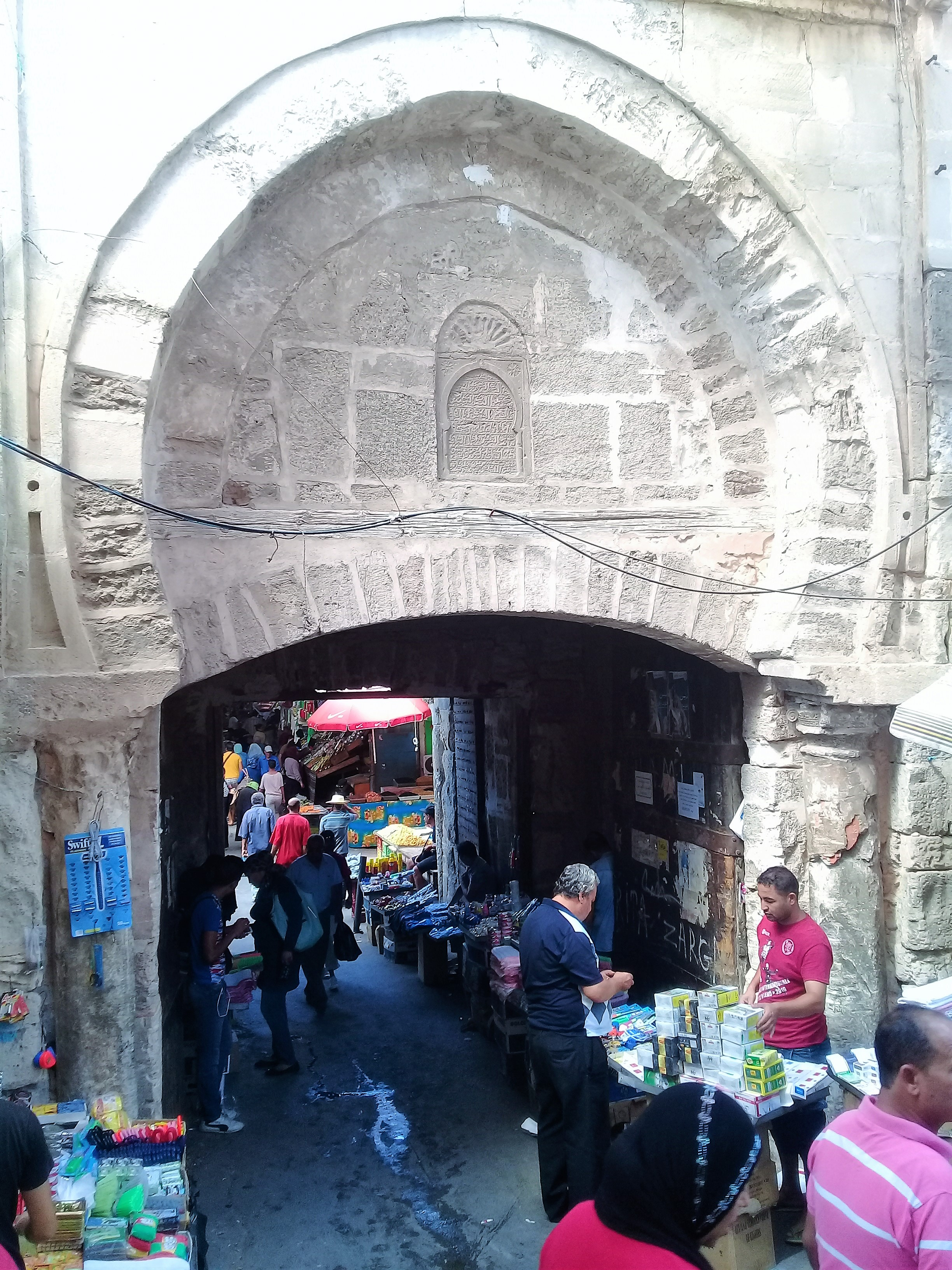
Merchands in Bab Jebli

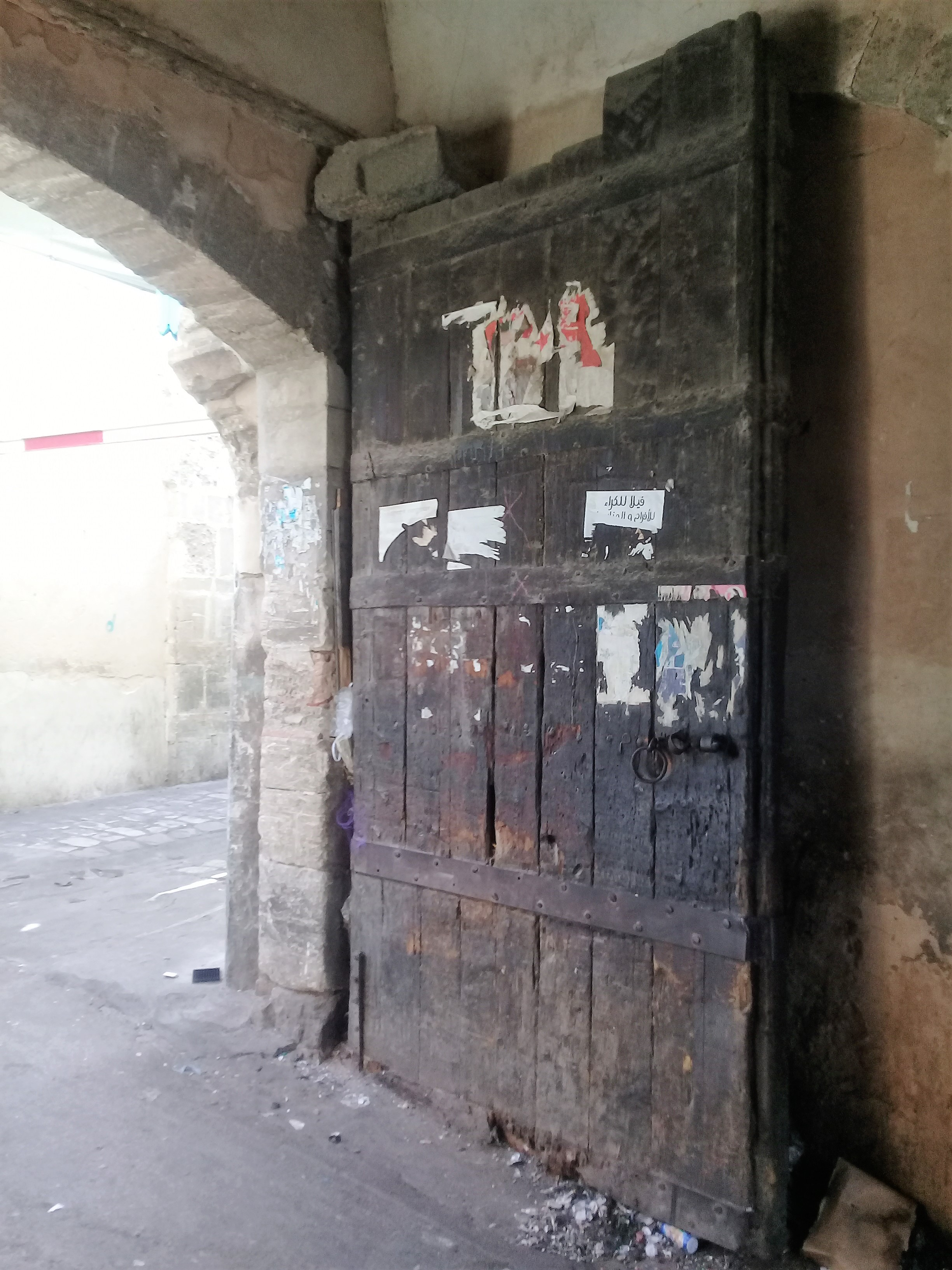
The door of Bab Jebli

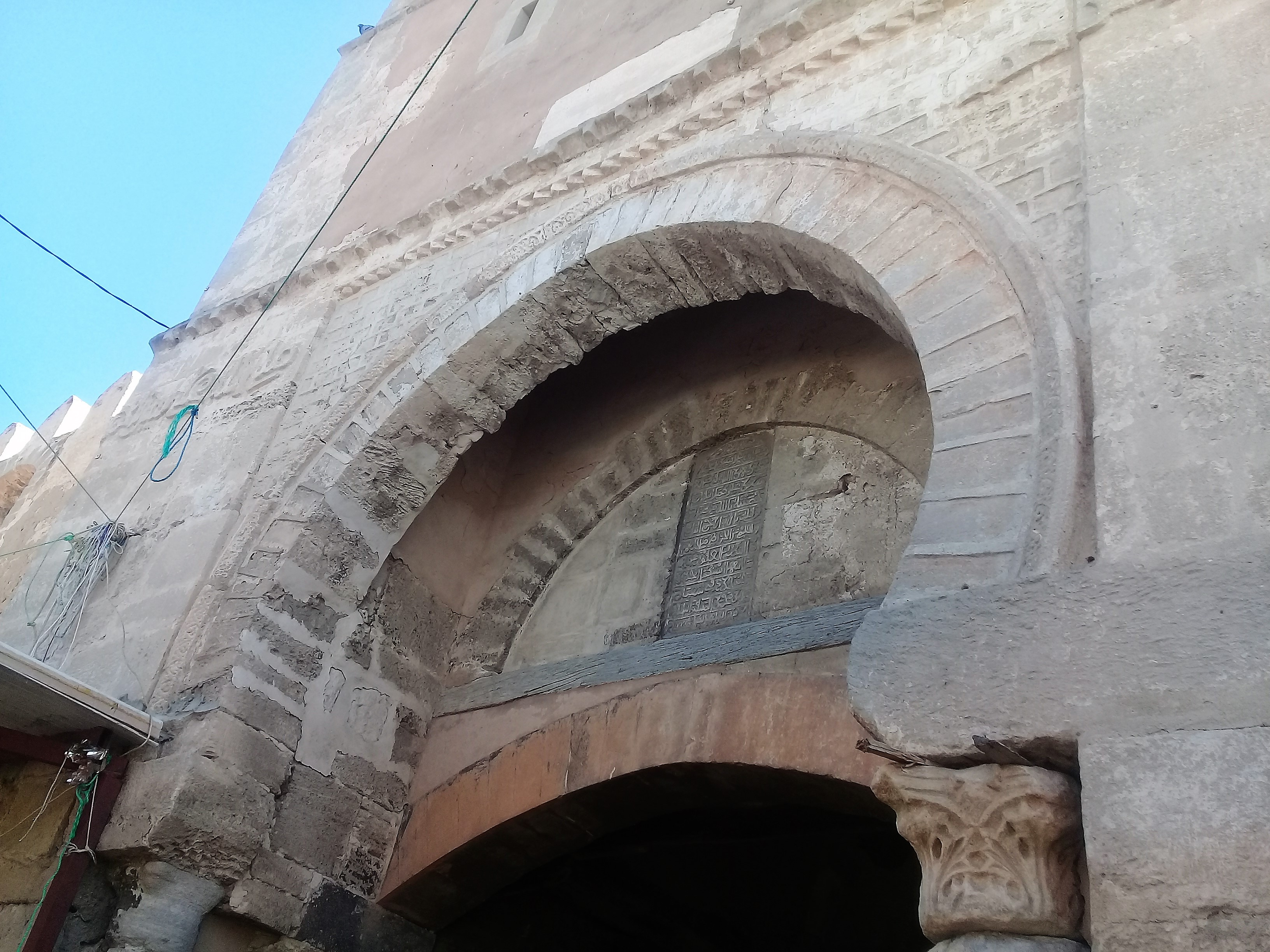
The arche of the outer entrance
