= Bab Nahj El Bey =

Coordinates: 34°44′16″N 10°45′37″E

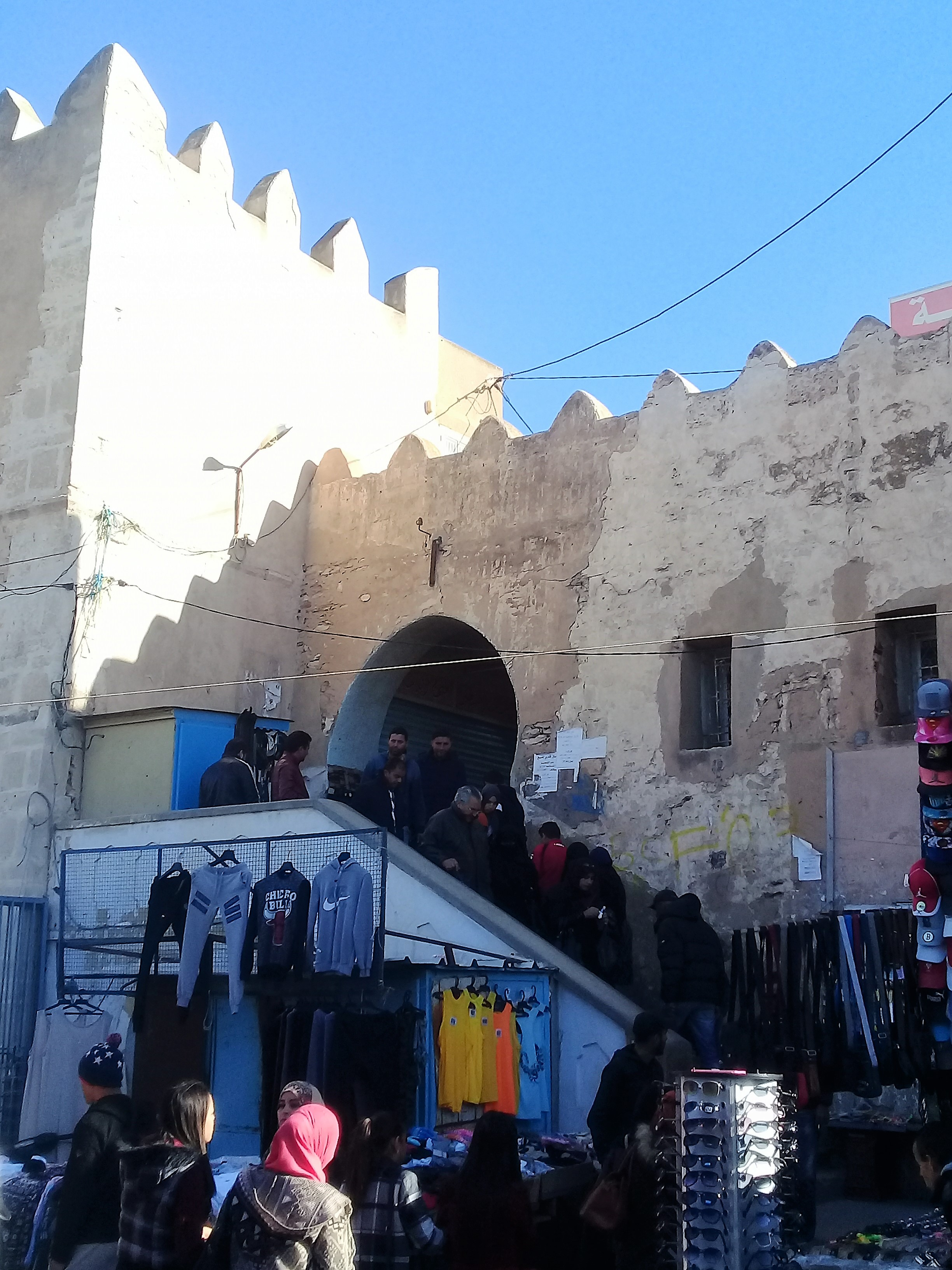
Merchants and passengers in Bab Nahj El Bey

Bab Nahj El Bey (Arabic : باب نهج الباي) (or The Bey's street Gate), also known as Drouj Eddimessi, is one of the gates of the medina of Sfax, located in the northern facade of its walls, near Bab Jebli.

Given the slightly hilly topography of the site, stairs were made to reach the gate and link Nahj El Bey (current Mongi Slim Street) to the outer souks surrounding the medina.

As many other gates, Bab Nahj El Bey was built during the 20th century in order to help decreasing the flood of passengers through Bab Jebli and Bab Diwan, and to facilitate the exchange with the hinterland.
