= Souk El Saffajine =

Souk El Saffajine (Arabic: سوق السفاجين) is one of the markets of the medina of Sfax that no longer exists.

== Localization ==
Souk El Saffajine used to be located in the alley between Souk El Trouk and Souk Al Balghajine.

== Speciality ==
This Souk used to be for making and selling Tunisian desserts called Saffej, thus the name of the souk.
