= Sidi Ali Karray Mausoleum =

Zawiya in Sfax, Tunisia

The Sidi Ali Karray Mausoleum (Arabic: زاوية سيدي علي الكراي) is one of the famous mausoleums of the medina of Sfax.

== History ==
The Sidi Ali Karray Mausoleum is the oldest funerary building in the medina of Sfax. It was built in several stages, the most important of which took place after the death of the saint Sidi Ali Karray at the end of the 15th century.

It was the first religious building in the medina of Sfax to combine both prayer and funerary structures (turba) in its architecture, a characteristic that inspired the construction of later mausoleums with the same structure such as the Sidi Belhassen Karray Mausoleum (in the 16th century) and Sidi Amar Kammoun Mausoleum (in the 17th century).

Between 1978 and 1982, the monument underwent a radical transformation that destroyed all its historical features.

== Architecture ==
The mausoleum was built in three stages:

=== First stage ===
The original part of the mausoleum was the prayer room on the southeast side of the building. It is a rectangular room, ten meters by seven meters, with the floor divided into six aisles, three of which are parallel to the wall of the qibla and three narrower perpendicular ones. This arrangement is based on four central columns from which extend two rows of tripled arches following an east–west axis.

=== Second stage ===
The second stage was an extension of the prayer hall on the eastern side and the addition of a burial chamber to the north. The latter is a rectangular room of 5.75 meters by 4.7 meters.

The dome of this room is a typical example of a specific Sfax construction technique, which involves is the using a wooden tool to press the plaster more firmly onto the underlying structure, leaving small square indentations on the surface.

=== Third stage ===
According to Faouzi Mahfoudh, towards the end of the 18th century, the building underwent restoration and a small patio was added as part of the construction of a house (probably that of Saint Abdallah Jammoussi) on the northeast side of the oratory. This patio has a covered gallery near the entrance and stairs to an upper floor, giving the whole mausoleum a domestic feel.
