= Souk El Trouk (Sfax) =

Souk El Trouk (Arabic : سوق الترك ) is one of the oldest markets in the Medina of Sfax.

== Localisation ==
Souk El Trouk used to be expanded all over the covered part of Zuqaq El Marr.

== Etymology ==
The souk used as inspiration for its name a small mosque that was located inside of the souk and was called El Trouk Mosque.

== History ==
According to Ali Zouari in his book "Sfax in the 18th and 19th century" , souk el Trouk was built in the 18th century for the citizens of sfax who followed the Hanafi doctrine of Turkish origin. According to French Protection Authorities' reports, the souk specialized in selling spices and blankets. It was also known for its large coffee shop that used to be the meeting place for the gentlemen of the city.
