= El Trouk Mosque =

Mosque in Sfax, Tunisia

- جامع الترك

Religion
- Affiliation: Islam

Location
- Municipality: Medina of Sfax
- Country: Tunisia
- Interactive map of El Trouk Mosque

Architecture
- Type: mosque

Specifications
- Length: 10 m
- Width: 10 m

El Trouk Mosque, or Mosque of the Turks (Arabic: جامع الترك) is one of the mosques of the Medina of Sfax, Tunisia.

== Localisation ==
The mosque is located in the eastern part of Souk El Jomaa.

== History ==
According to the memorial plaque next to the mihrab, the current mosque is the result of rebuilding an older one. According to some historians, it used to be a Hanafi mosque whose followers in Sfax were a minority and were almost all Turks, hence the name of the mosque. But other researchers suggest that the name of the mosque comes from its builder, Abdallah ben Mohamed ben Yahia Turki Pacha. This plaque dates back to 1706, date of the rise of Al Husayn Ibn Ali to the throne.

== Architecture ==
The mosque has a square shape with 10 meters on each side.
