= Souk El Khardajiya =

Souk El Khardajiya (Arabic: سوق الخرداجية) or the Scrap market is one of the souks of the Medina of Sfax.

== Localization ==
The souk was located in Ettaam Square also known as Ahmed Bey's Square in the western part of Nahj El Bey (or Zuqaq El Marr, the current Mongi Slim Street), near Sidi Khanfir Mosque.

== Etymology ==
The market got its name from its specialty, which is scrap trading.
