= Mseddi Mosque =

MOsque in Sfax, Tunisia

- جامع المسدي

Religion
- Affiliation: Islam

Location
- Municipality: Medina of Sfax
- Country: Tunisia

Architecture
- Type: mosque

El Mseddi Mosque (Arabic: جامع المسدي), also known as Sidi El Mseddi Mosque, is one of the old mosques of the medina of Sfax, Tunisia.

== Localisation ==
The mosque is located in the northern part of the medina, just next to Souk El Balghagine. It opens on Nahj El Bey Street (current Mongi Slim Street), facing a hammam with the same name.

== History ==
Over the decades, this mosque got many appellations. It was first named "the souk's Mosque" because of its location at the souk El Balghagine. Later, it became called "Palm Mosque", because of the palm tree in its patio, or "Mosque of the hammam", in reference to the hammam located just on the other side of the street.

It got its current name at the end of the 19th century, because a sheikh from the El Mseddi family taught Qur'an for its students. In 1895, the mosque began to host the Friday prayer.

== Description ==
When founded, the mosque consisted of a small prayer room with a patio. In 1895, the building was enlarged to accommodate Friday prayers. The prayer room is then enlarged by integrating the patio. The monument has also a minaret nowadays.
