= Souk El Arousayn =

Souk El Arousayn (Arabic: سوق العروسين) or the "married couple's market" was a souk that existed as part of the medina of Sfax.

== History ==
Souk El Arousayn was originally a residential district, that by the time, got invaded by wood painting artisans who established their workshops in it.

These artisans used to make jewellery boxes and other products that recently married couples buy for their new house. And that's how the souk got its famous appellation.

== Localization ==
This market was located in the eastern part of the current Mecca Street.
