= Sidi Lakhmi mausoleum =

Zawiya in Sfax, Tunisia

Sidi Lakhmi mausoleum or Sidi Abi Al Hassan Lakhmi mausoleum (Arabic: زاوية سيدي أبي الحسن اللخمي) is one of the most important mausoleums of the medina of Sfax. It is located outside the walls of the city.

== History ==
According to the inscription at the entrance of the mausoleum, the monument was built in the 17th century during the reign of the Muradid dynasty, six centuries after the death of the saint Sidi Abu El Hassan El Lakhami in 1085. Initially, he was first buried in the old cemetery of Sfax (oldest cemetery in the city).

Over time, the mausoleum acquired important religious status and became a very important destination for prayer and seeking blessings for local communities in Sfax and adjacent. The building kept receiving visitors for centuries until its closure by the Tunisian authorities in 2011, after the revolution.

== Location ==
The Sidi Lakhmi's zaouia is located outside the walls of the medina, on the north side near Bab Jebli, and just next to Sidi Lakhmi mosque.

== Architecture ==
Before the construction of Sidi Lakhmi mosque (also called El Jedid mosque), access to the mausoleum was through a small entrance in front of Bab Jebli that opened onto a small court. This court has two side galleries: The first, on the eastern side, is based on a column and gives access to the bathroom, an ablution room and a water-well. The second, on the western side, is composed of two arches and leads to a small rectangular room.

The rectangular hall of the sanctuary is decorated with an Ottoman style, and capitals with Hafsid style. It has a dome made of pottery tubes that help to reduce the total weight, and limestone corner blocks that ensure the transition from the square part of the basis to the circular one.
