= Driba Mosque =

Mosque in Sfax, Tunisia

Coordinates: 34.7362°N 10.7624°E

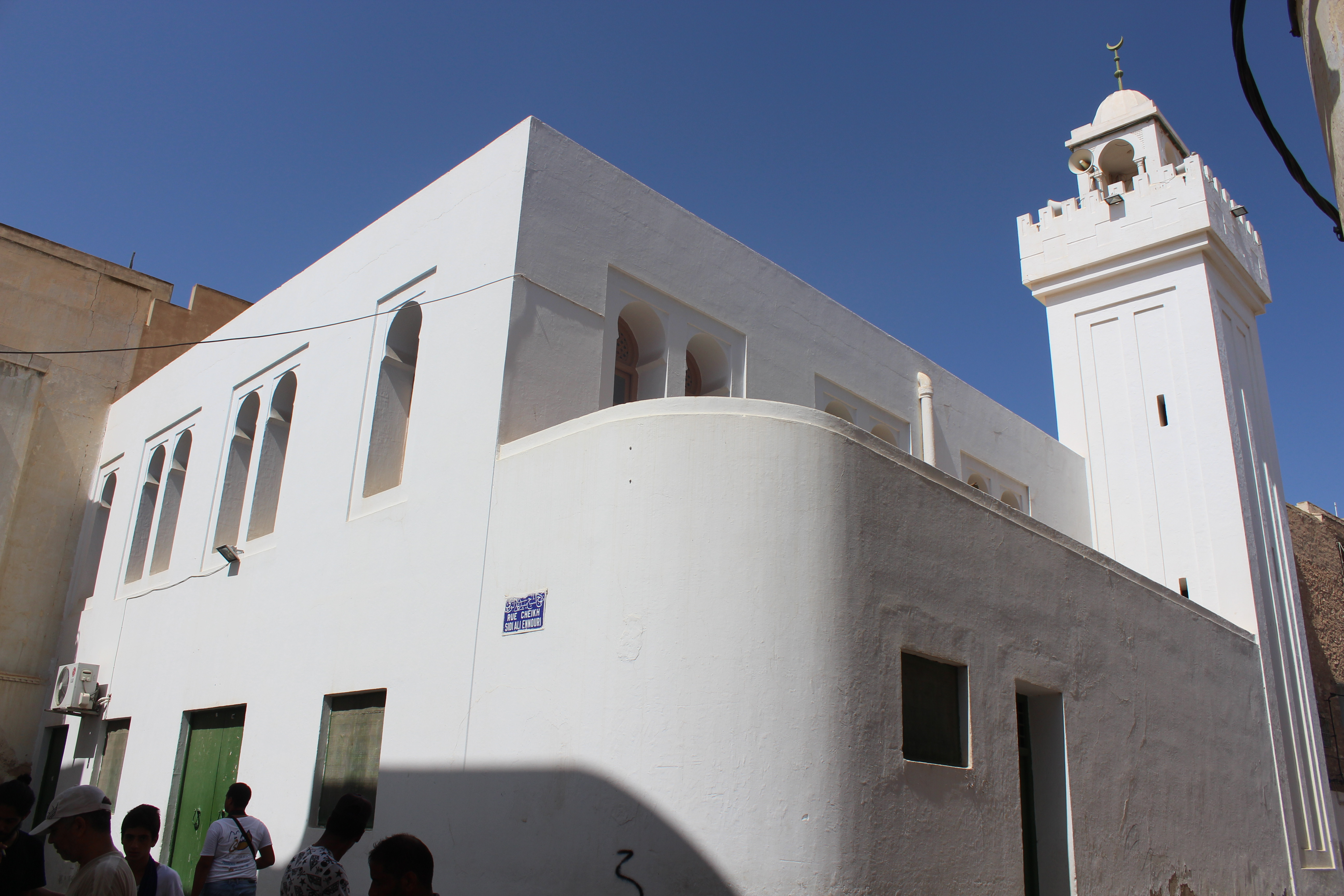
Driba Mosque

Driba Mosque (arabic: جامع الدريبة) or old Sidi Lakhmi Mosque (جامع سيدي اللخمي الأصلي) is one of the mosques of the medina of Sfax, Tunisia.

== Localisation ==
The mosque is located in Driba Street, in front of Dar Jellouli, the current museum of traditional arts of Sfax. It also opens on Cheikh Ennouri street on the west side It is very close to hammam El Soltane and the mausoleums of Sidi Feriani and Sidi Jebla.

== History ==
Just after his arrival from Kairouan to Sfax in the 11th century, Sidi Belhassan El Lakhmi built a small mosque, that rapidly evolved into a regional scientific training center. In 1289, the building underwent restoration and extension work to adapt it to its new function and the constantly increasing number of visitors. Many scientists studied there like Sheikh Muhammad El Khemiri, Sheikh Ali El Moakher and Abu Bakr El Gargouri. Among his teachers were Sheikh Abdel Salam Charfi and his son Taïeb Charfi.

During the 20th century, and like most monuments in the medina of Sfax, the building was destroyed after the bombing attacks of the Second World War, in 1942. A second mosque was built in its place during the protectorate, and took the name from the Driba Mosque, given its location.

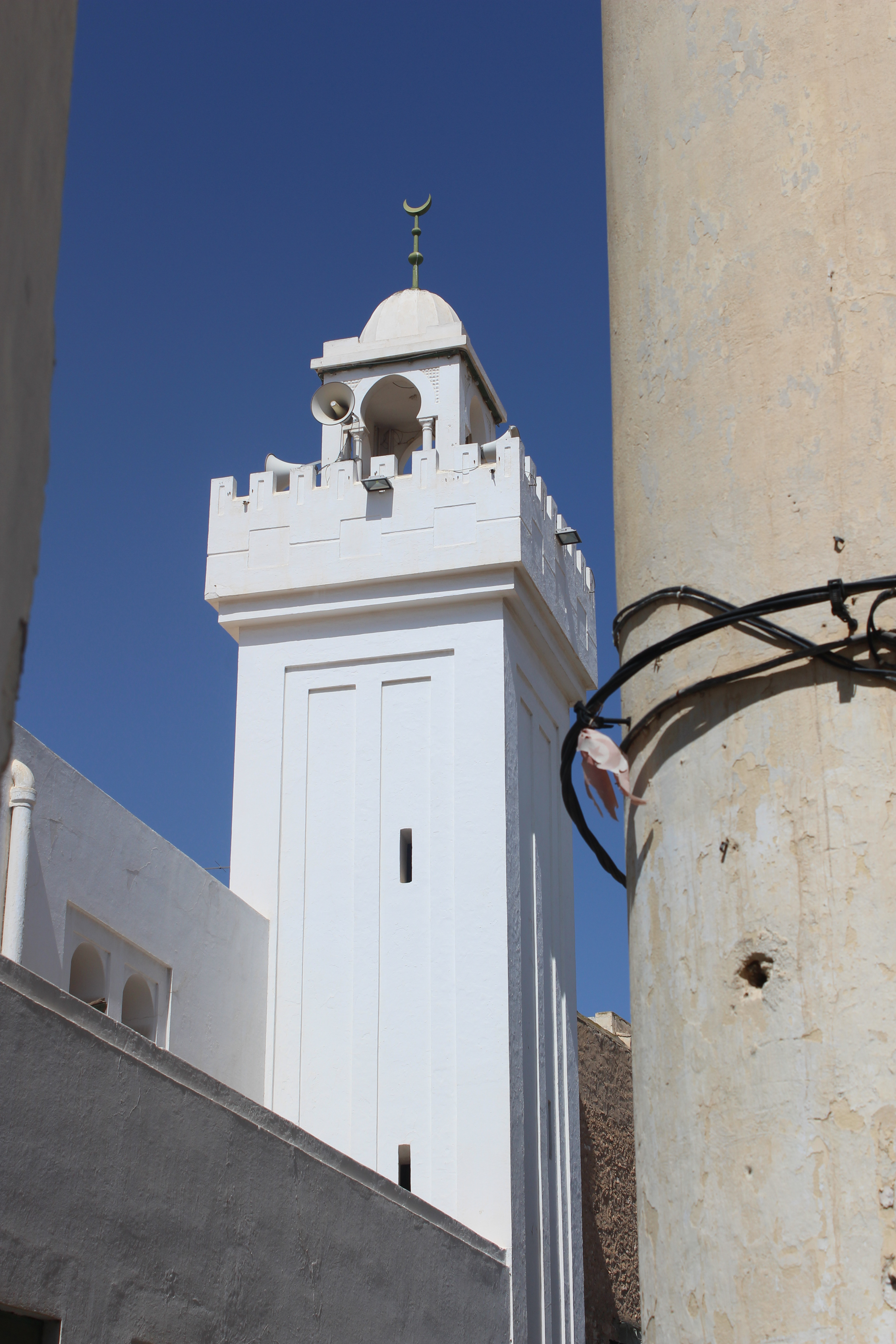
Minaret of the mosque

== Architecture ==
The current Driba Mosque has a hybrid architectural style with both Arabic and French features, the most important being the fact that it has two floors, a very rare thing in Muslim religious buildings, justified by the fatwas of some imams who forbid prayer in high places.

It occupies a total area of 320 square meters, with the prayer room and side galleries taking the most of it. The interior can be accessed through four entrances at both facades. These facades are distinguished by their simplicity and the multiplicity of windows shared in two lines, which create natural lighting for the prayer room. Access to the first floor is via stairs at the west corner. The main purpose of this floor is to increase the capacity of the mosque to welcome believers during prayers.

The mosque also has a square minaret (which confirms its belonging to the Maliki rite) and a room for the imam connected by a small patio.
