= Dar Al Quran =

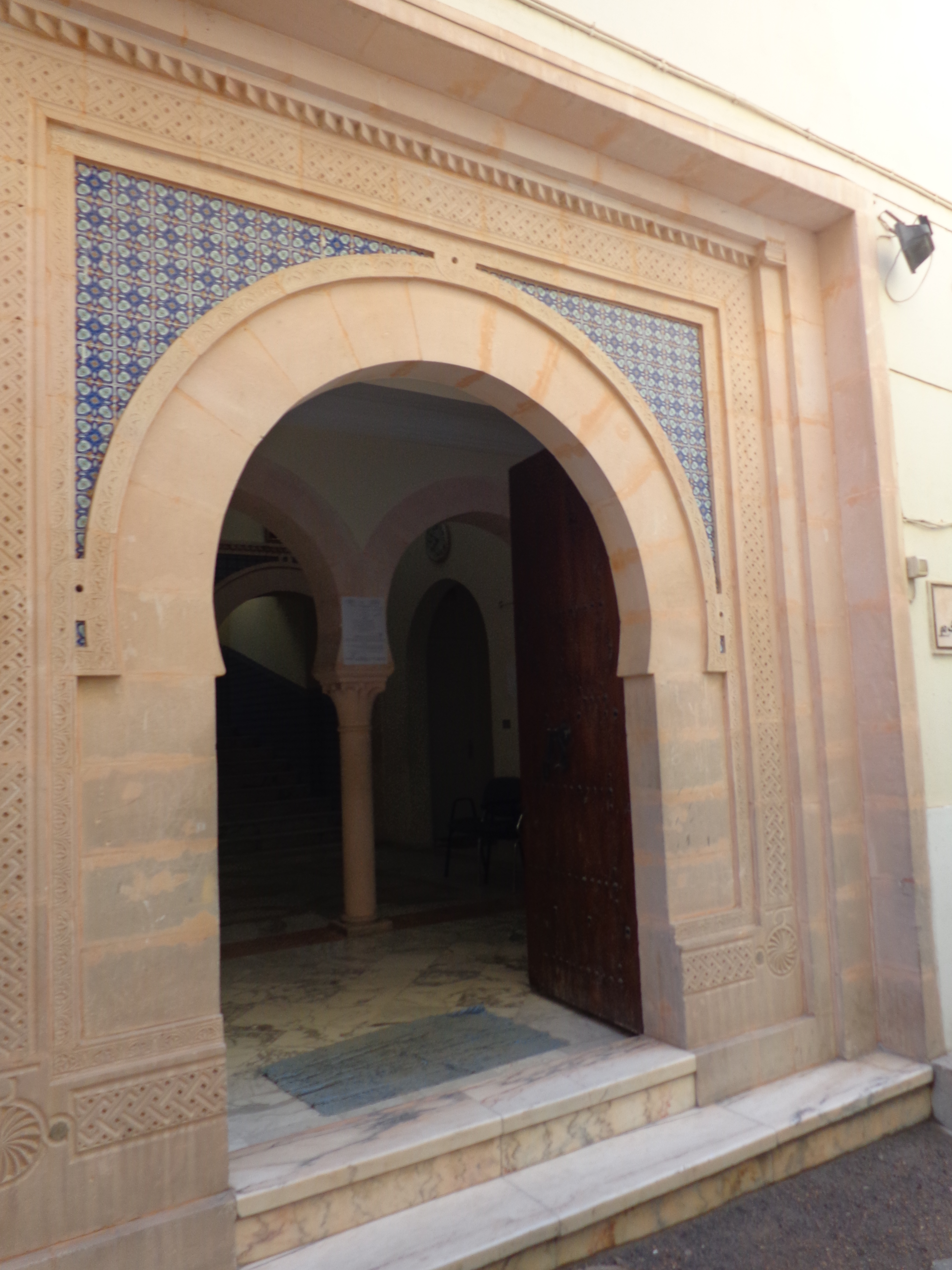
Entrance of Dar Al Quran

Dar Al Quran (Arabic: دار القرآن) is one of the oldest and most famous houses of the medina of Sfax. It is the headquarters of the association of Quran and morals preservation.

== History ==
Hall of the Dar

Initially, it belonged to one of Sfax's famous poets and scientists, Ibrahim Kharrat (1738-1836), who later donated it and turned it into a mausoleum to teach quran.

Later, the building was seriously damaged, which made Hadj Khalifa Ben Ahmed Tarari Ferjani donate money to restore it during the French protectorate of Tunisia period. Apart from repairing the structural damage, he introduced new teaching methods and modern courses into the program of the mausoleum.

In 1998, Dar Al Quran was restored for a second time by the Tunisian Ministry of Religious Affairs, and opened its doors to visitors in 2000.
