= Dar Affes =

House of the medina of Sfax, Tunisia

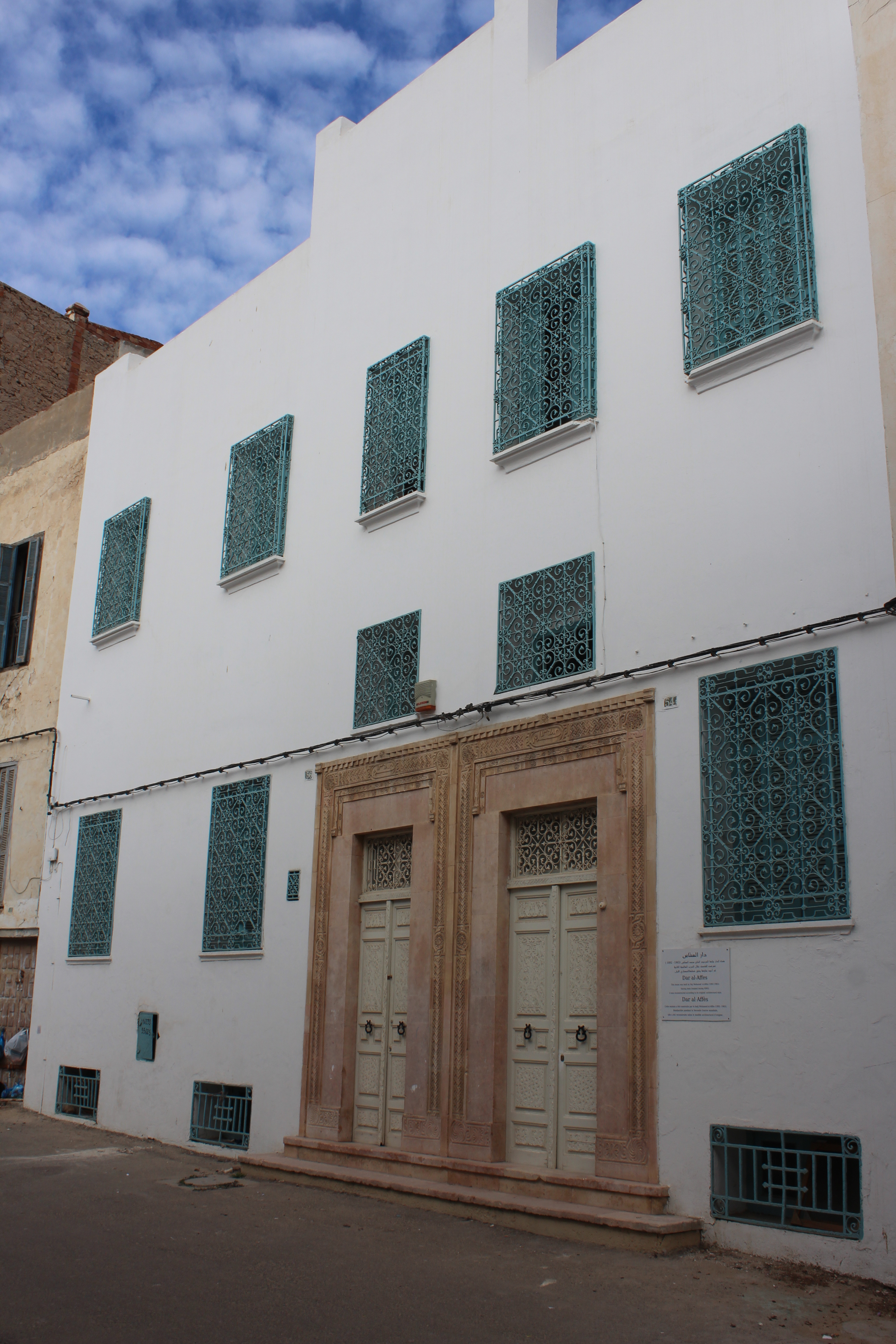
Facade of Dar Affes

Dar Affes (arabic: دار العفاس) is one of the old houses of the medina of Sfax.

== Location ==
The house is located in the south western part of the medina, in Al Kasbah street, near the kasbah and the medressa Abbassiya.

== History ==
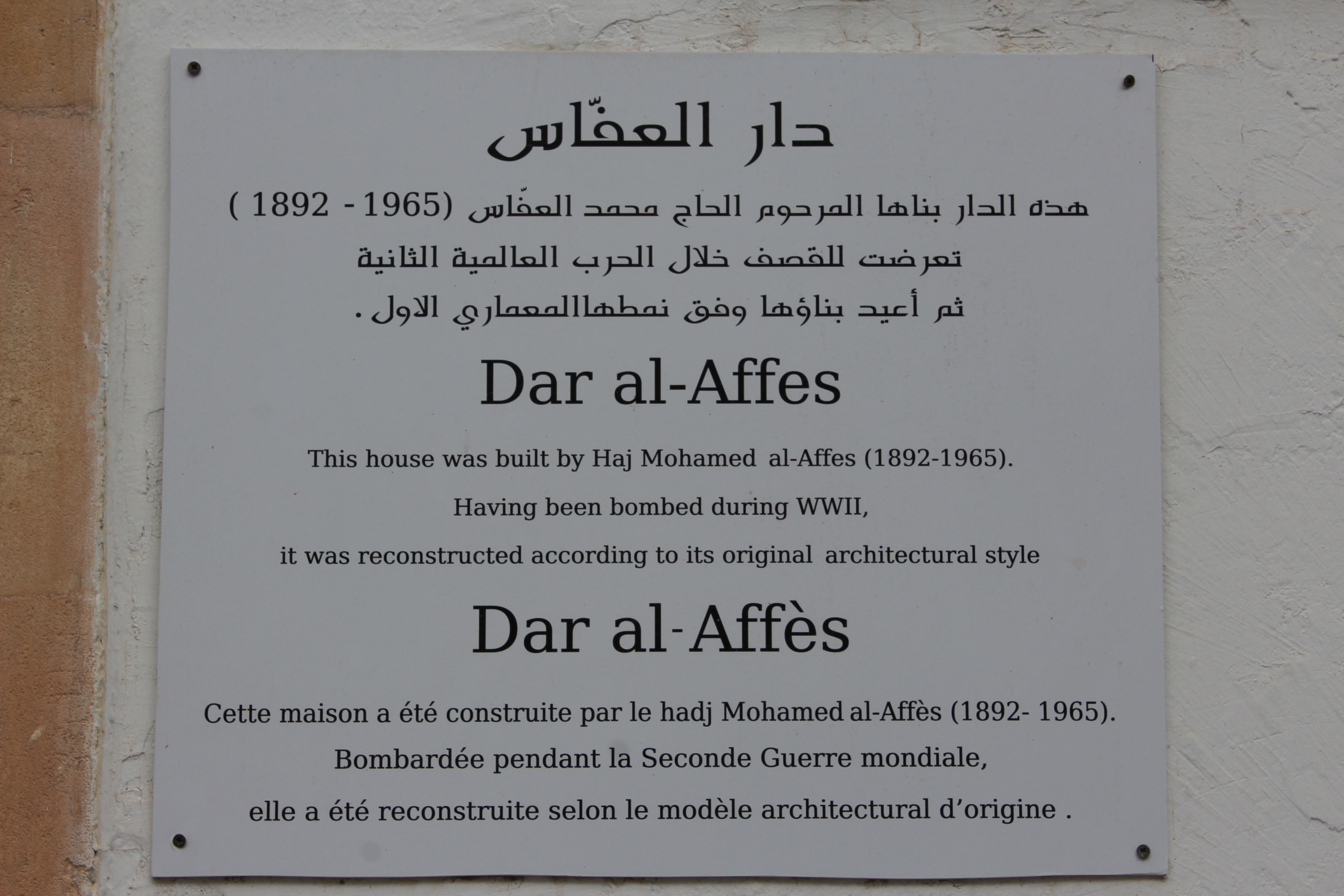
Commemorative plaque of Dar Affes

According to the commemorative plaque at the entrance of the monument, it was built during the 20th century, by Hadj Maohamed Affes (1892–1965). Unfortunately, and like many other monuments of the city, it got hugely damaged because of the second world war attacks. But it got rebuilt with the same architectural structure and design.

In 2016, and as part of the activities of "Sfax, arab Capital of Culture" celebration, Dar Affes got converted into a poetry house and a cultural space for local civic organisations.

== Gallery ==
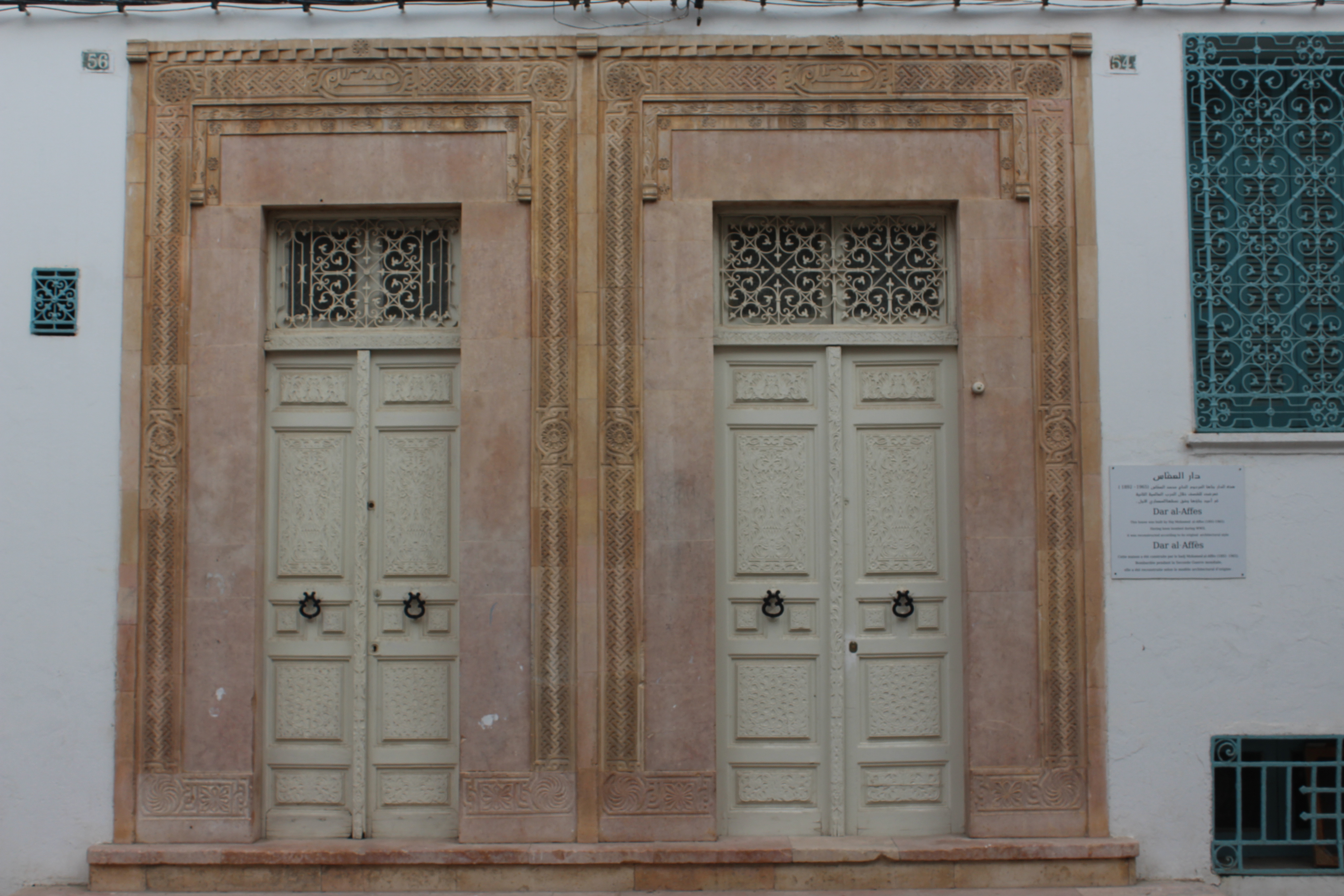
Entrance of Dar Affes

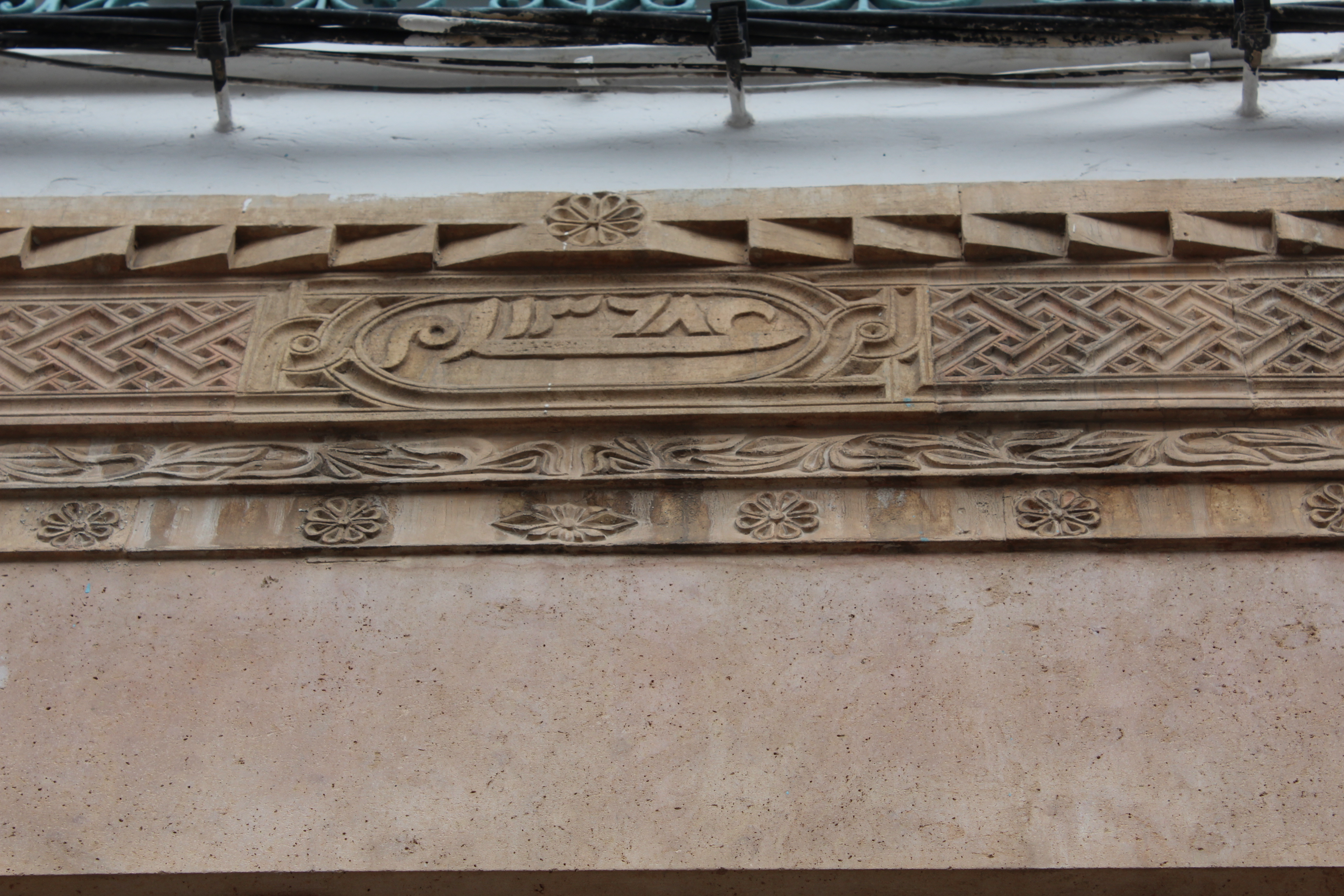
An inscription at the entrance indicating the construction date

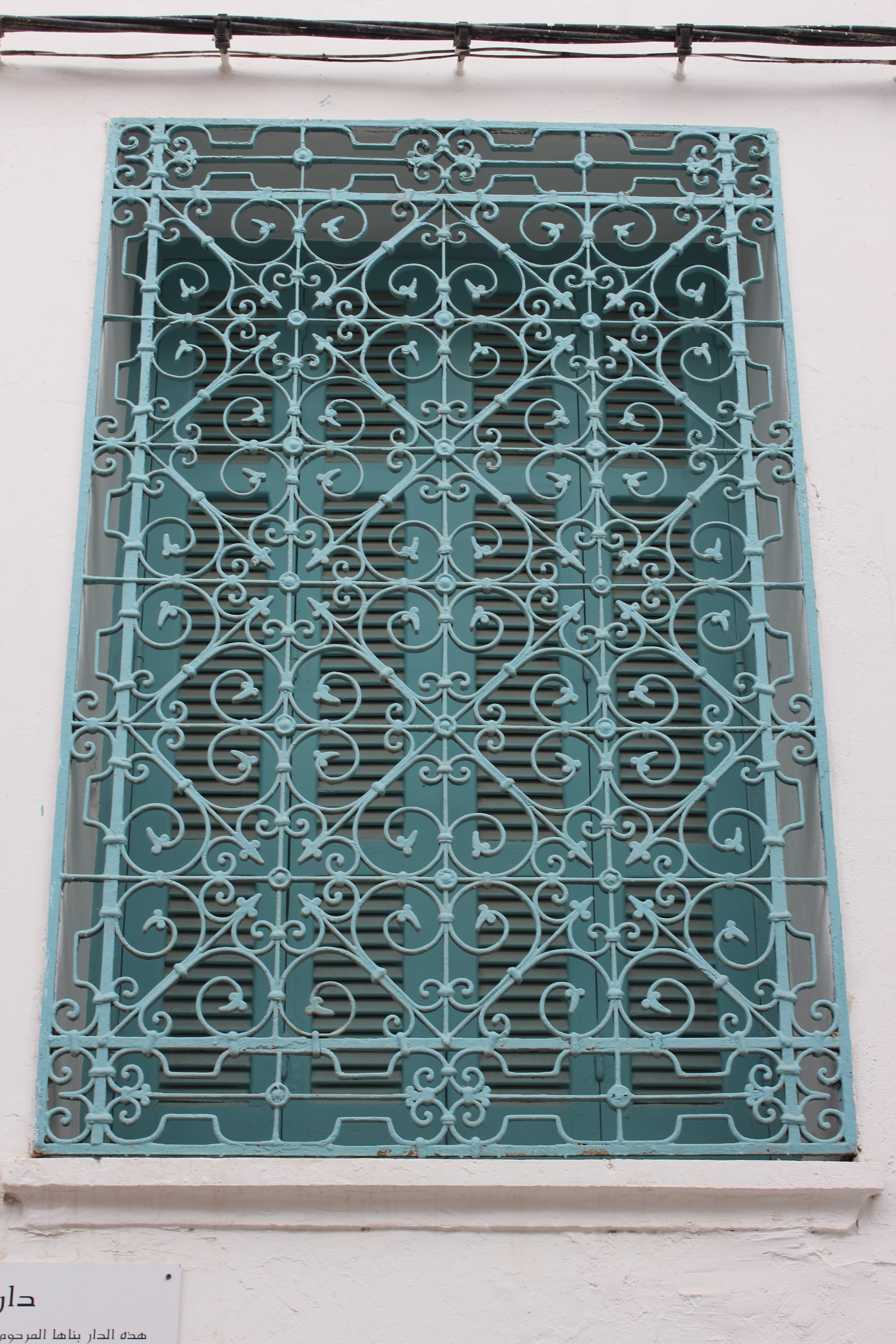
Metal decoration of the window

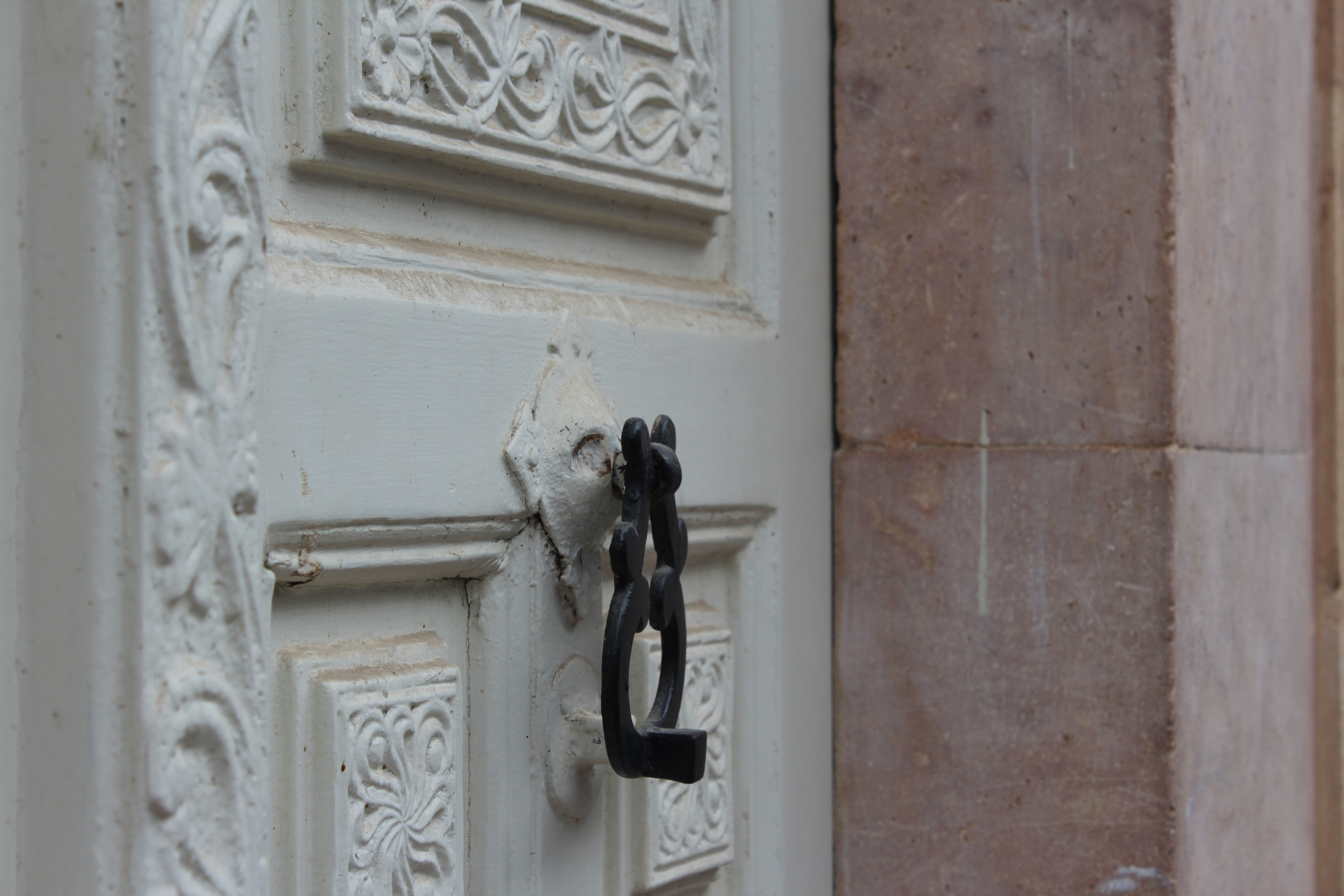
Decoration of the door
