= Souk El Jomaa =

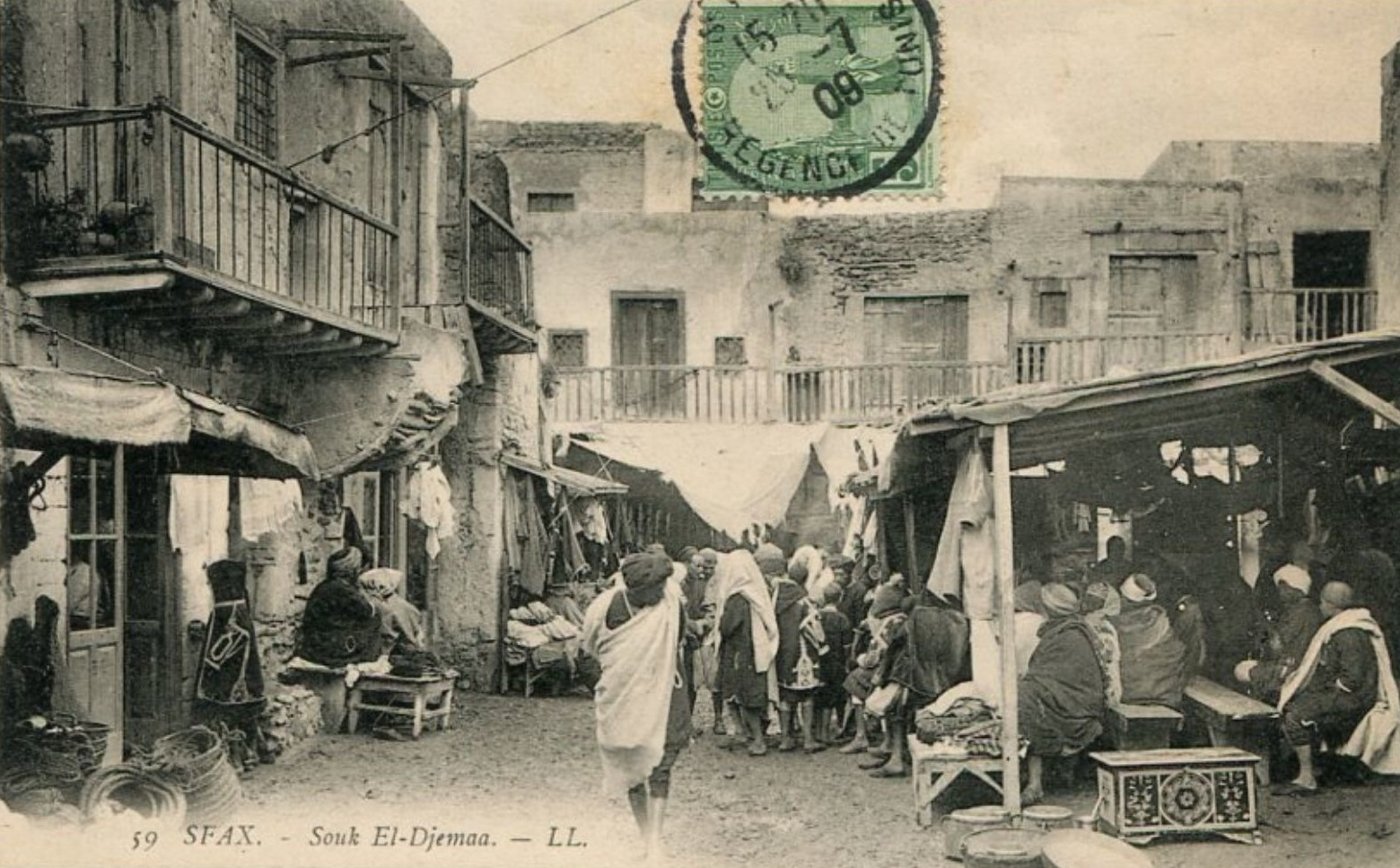
Souk El Jomaa in the 20th century

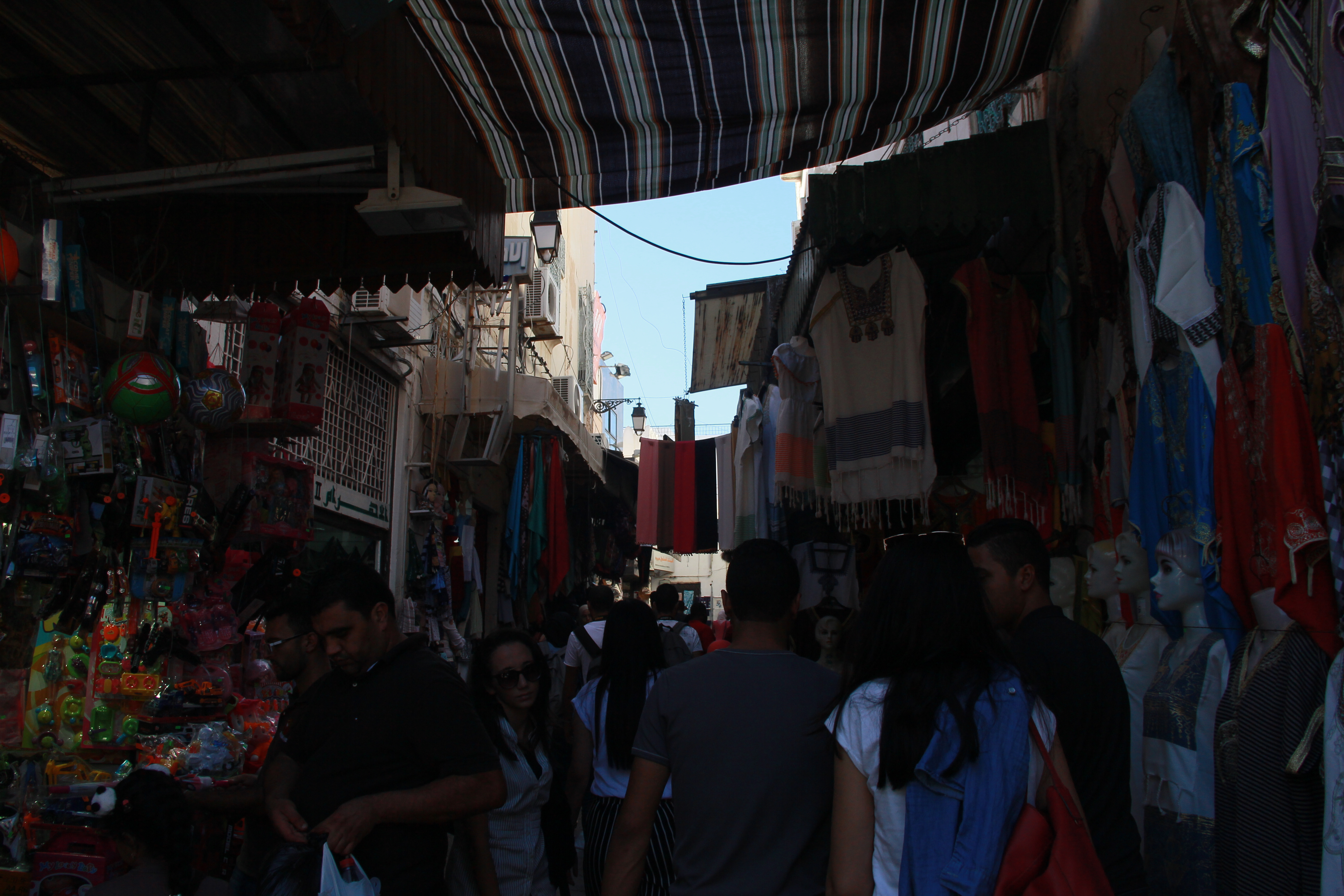
Souk El Jomaa nowadays

Souk El Jomaa (Arabic: سوق الجمعة) is the first souk that was made in Sfax even before the fence and the Great Mosque of Sfax. It is located in the middle of the Medina, in the east side of the Great Mosque of Sfax, between the latter's path and Nahj El Bey.

== History ==
Considering that its location is not far from the sea, this souk was the destination of the village residents' products and other neighboring islands before the establishing of the medina.

It was named the way it is in relation to the day it used to open on which was "friday". It used to have all kinds of products until other souks were made and things got more organized and each souk had its own speciality that it was made for. As a result, Souk El Jomaa became dedicated to selling old clothes and furniture.

Today, Souk El Jomaa is open for all the days of the week.

== Architecture ==
The now-existing architecture is different from the one it used to be. In the thirteenth century it was named Souk El Kachachine according to a document dated 1262. At the beginning of this century, a coffee shop, an electric light tank and huge water containers called Mejel used to be located in the middle,

During the Husainid era, a school that had a mosque for prayers and houses for the students of the Great Mosque of Sfax was established in the Souk. Also, on its south Mosque of El Turk was built, west from the school.
