= Sidi Belhassen Karray Mausoleum =

Zawiya in Sfax, Tunisia

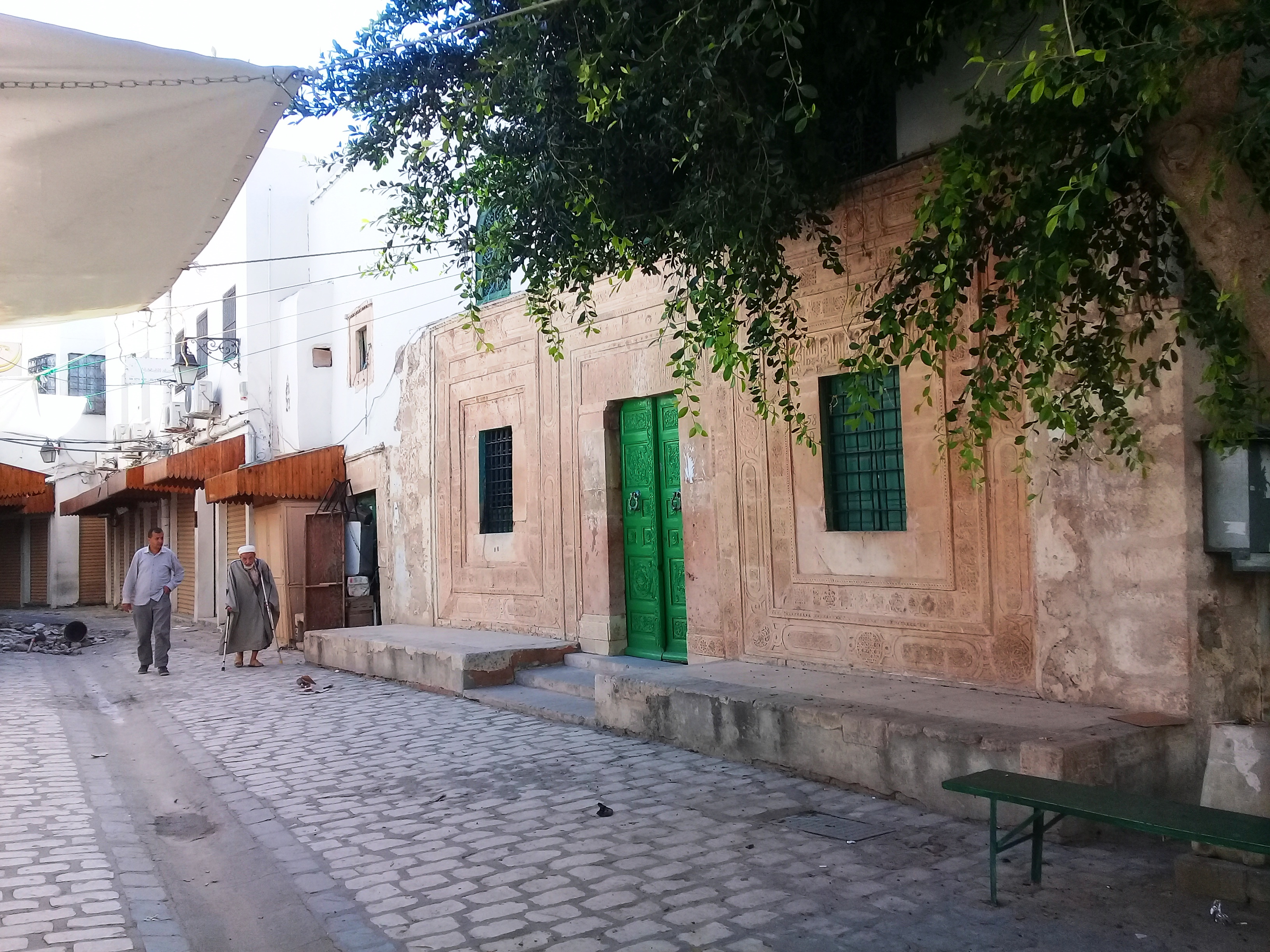
Facade of Sidi Belhassen Karray mausoleum

Sidi Belhassen Karray mausoleum (Arabic: سيدي بلحسن الكراي) is one of the mausoleums of the medina of Sfax.

== History ==
The zaouia was built in the 19th century by Mohamed Menif, son of Hadj Ali Menif.

According to some historians, it used to be Sidi Belhassen Karray's private house before his death.

== Location ==
The monument is located in the eastern quarter of the medina of Sfax, at the beginning of Sidi Belhassen Karray's street. It opens to Barberrouse Square.

== Architecture ==
The entrance of the monument occupies its center, with on the left the zaouia consisting of Sidi Belhassen Karray's tomb, a decorative dome and a mihrab, and a large court surrounded by galleries and which includes a second mihrab on the right. Inside, there is a prayer room and stairs leading to the first floor. This floor consists of two small rooms that were reserved for meditation Sidi Belhassen Karray after classes.

The facades of the building are richly decorated with verses from the Quran and carved wooden flowers. It is thanks to this decoration that the mausoleum is one of the most important and most visited monuments of the medina.

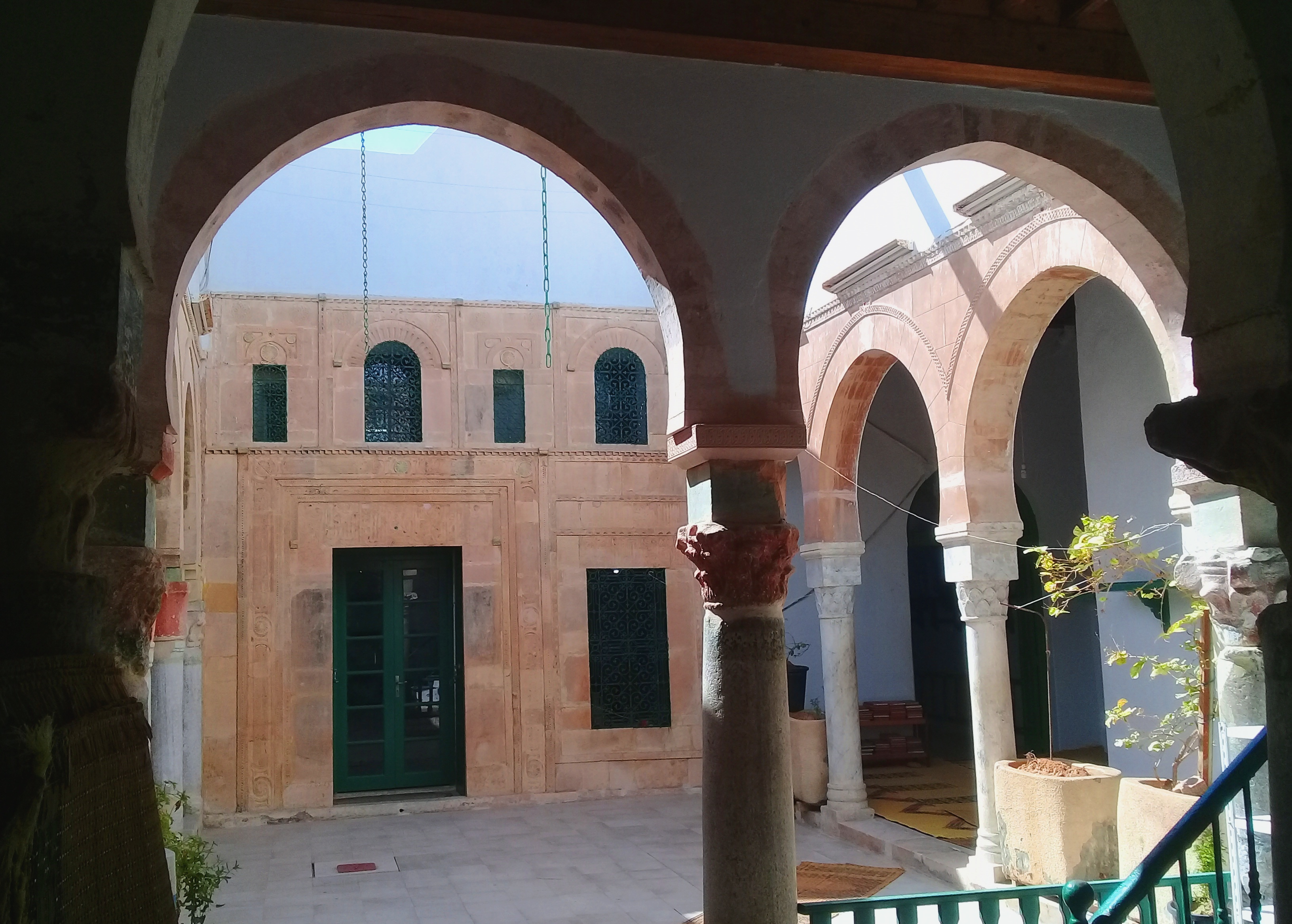
Court of the mausoleum

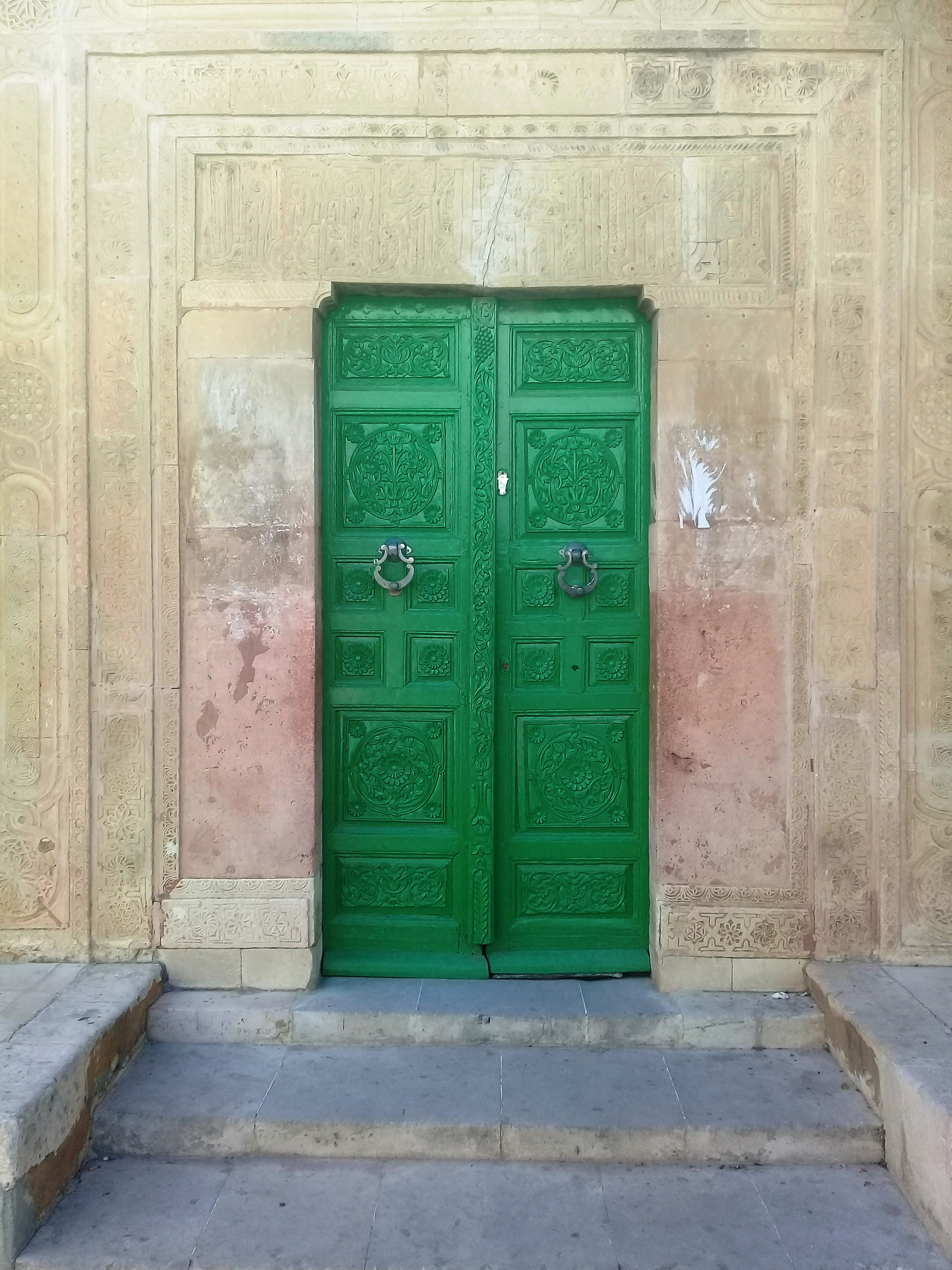
Richly decorated entrance of the building

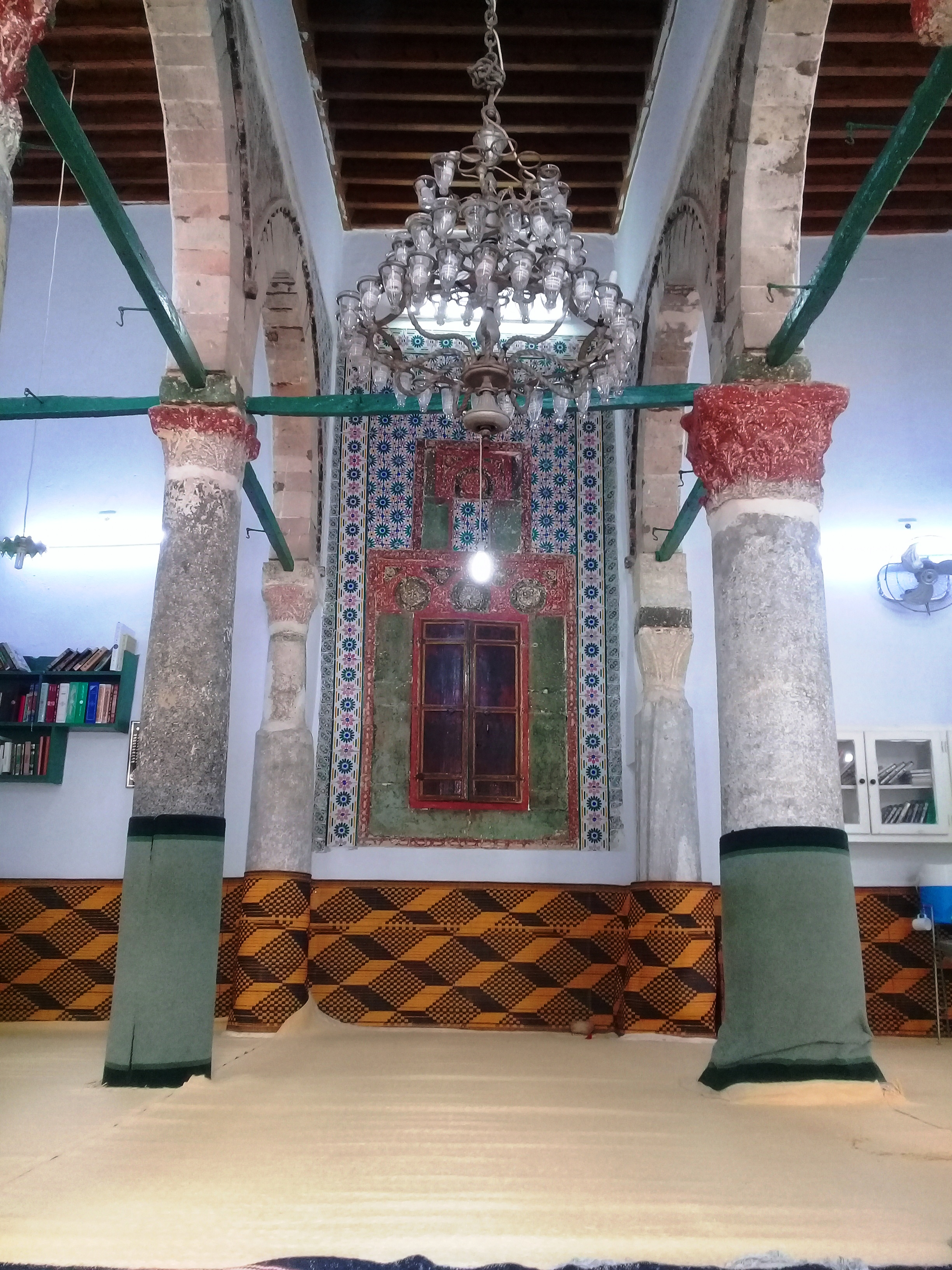
Prayer room

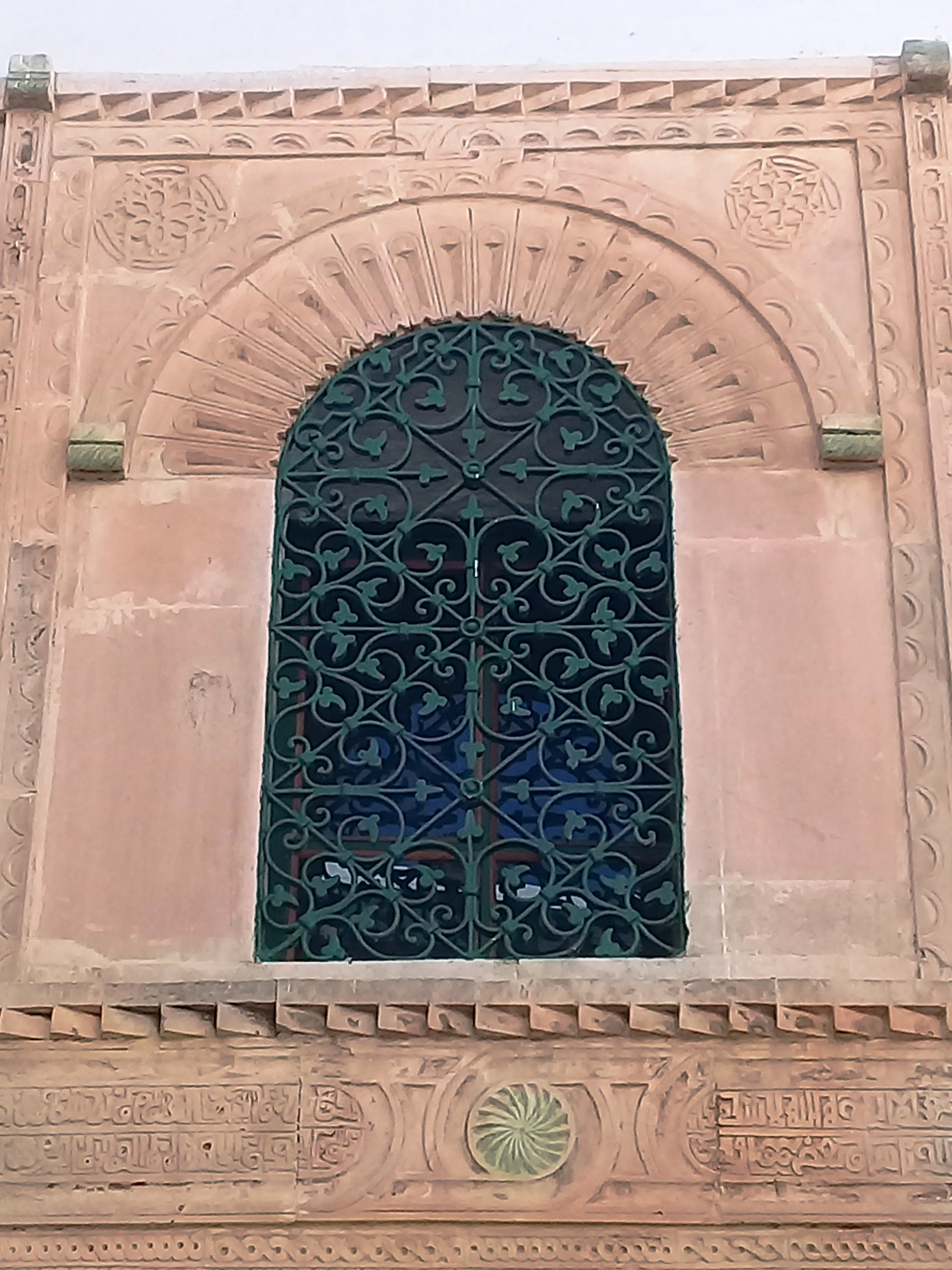
Window of the mausoleum

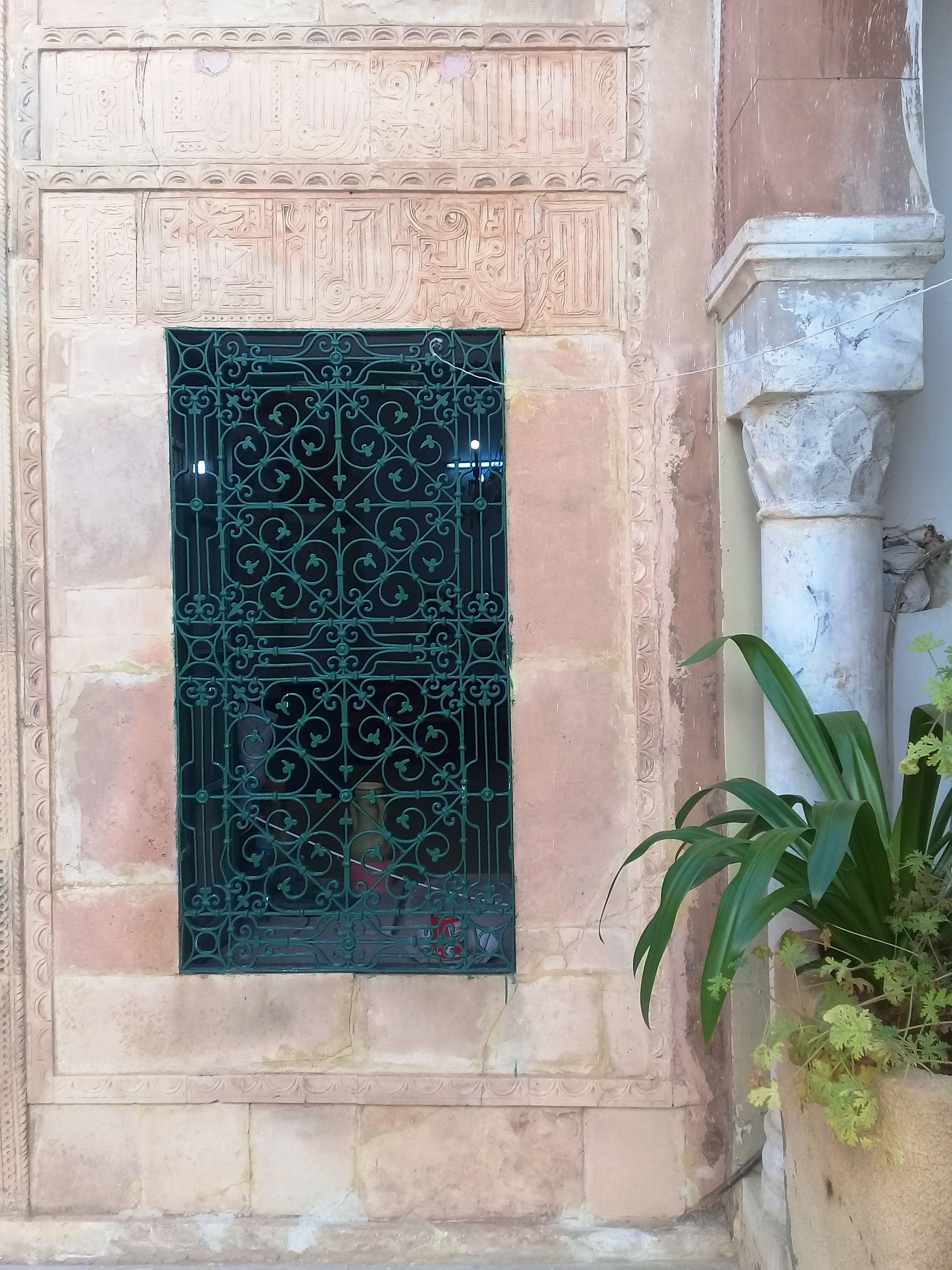
Another window on the left and a column on the right
