= Sidi Amar Kammoun Mausoleum =

Zawiya in Sfax, Tunisia

Coordinates: 34°44′07″N 10°45′47″E

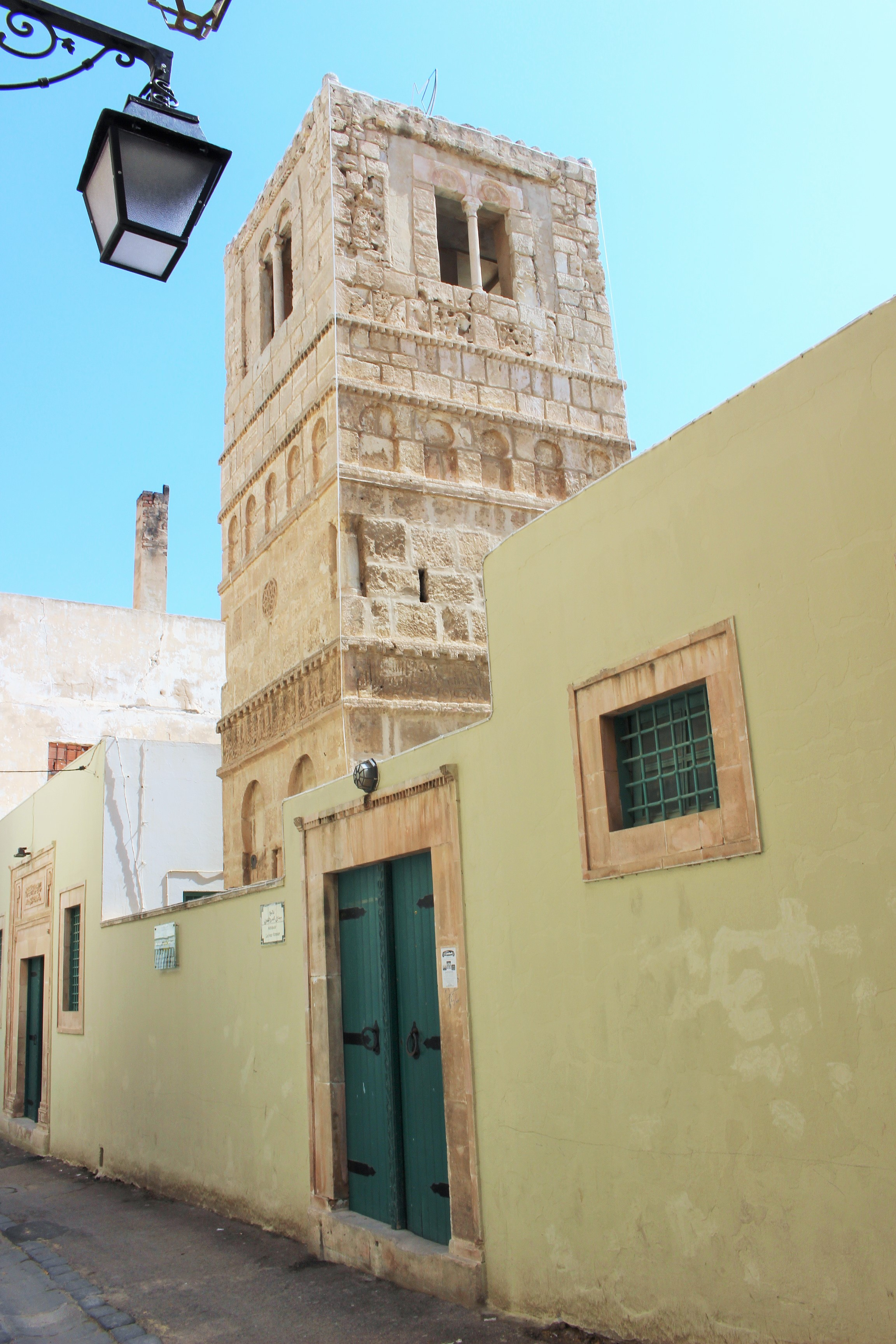
Entrance of Sidi Amar Kammoun mosque and mausoleum

Sidi Amar Kammoun mausoleum (Arabic: زاوية سيدي عمر كمون) is one of the most important mausoleums of the medina of Sfax, Tunisia.

== Location ==
The mausoleum is on Borj Ennar street, very close to the walls of the medina. It is located in the east quarter of Bab Diwan. The top of the minaret offers a panoramic view of the facade of the medina facing the sea. The choice of this location for the building is linked to the close relationship between the family of the saint who is buried there, Sidi Amar Kammoun, and the sea, since his father was a sailor (rais in Tunisian dialect).

== History ==
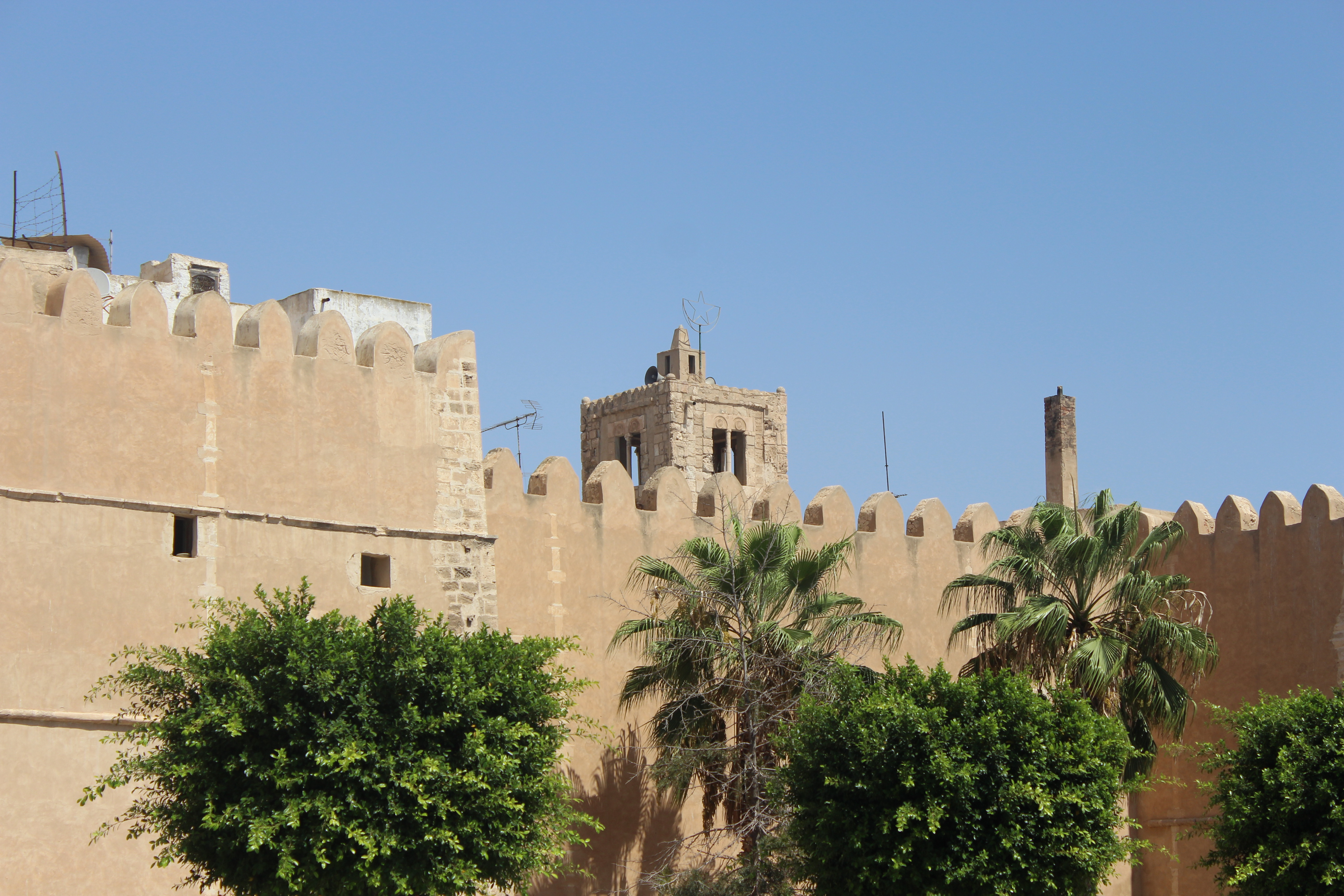
The minaret from outside the walls, which used to be a surveillance tower for marine attacks

The mausoleum was founded in the 18th century by order of Murad II Bey (1666–1675) to express gratitude to Sidi Amar Kammoun who treated him for a disease he got during one of his official visits to Sfax. The minaret was added later between 1636 and 1666 in two stages by Sidi Amar Kammoun, who himself took in charge all the expenses of his construction thanks to his personal fortune.

Apart from its religious and spiritual role, the mausoleum provides a very important defensive role during several crises thanks to its strategic geographical situation which allows the surveillance of the coastal facade of the medina from the minaret not only during a conflict with Sicily but also during the conquest of Tunisia by France.

== Architecture ==
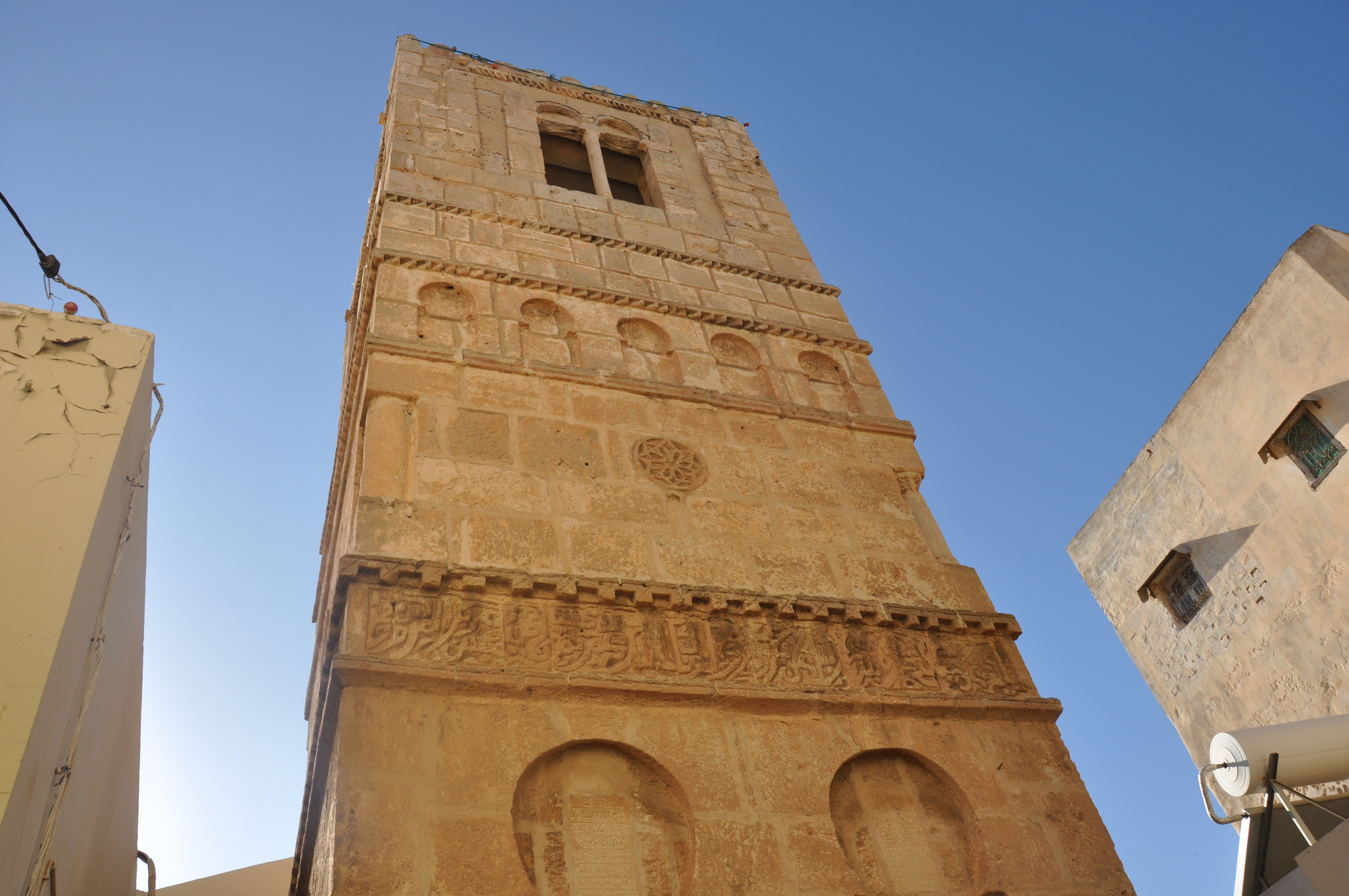
The mausoleum's mosque

Comparing to the other mausoleums of the medina, Sidi Amar Kammoun mausoleum differs by the hybrid architecture of its minaret which combines both the old local style and Moroccan influences imported by the Hafsids and the Ottomans.

The minaret, of square shape, culminates at a height of 9,30 meters. Its summit is equipped with a platform crowned with merlons2.

The north facade of the minaret is decorated with two rectangular commemorative plaques, contiguous just below the engraved calligraphy band. The right plate measures 49 cm high and 25 cm long, while the left, which is currently at risk of losing all its details, is 50 cm high and 25 cm long. The texts of nine lines each are written with a partially punctuated Tunisian style. Apart from these plates, the facades are richly decorated with moldings, serrations and architectural elements.

== Sidi Amar Kammoun ==
Sidi Amar Kammoun represents one of the most important icons of Sfaxian Sufism of the 18th century. Nowadays, it still keeps very important place in the Sfaxian community. Mahmoud Megdiche has devoted a big part of his book Nouzhat El Anthar (Arabic: نزهة الأنظار) to highlight his qualities and accomplishments.

He received much of his education from his master, Sheikh Sidi Ameur El Mzoughi, and was very close to Murad II Bey.
