= Medina of Sfax =

Coordinates: 34.734766°N 10.762225°E

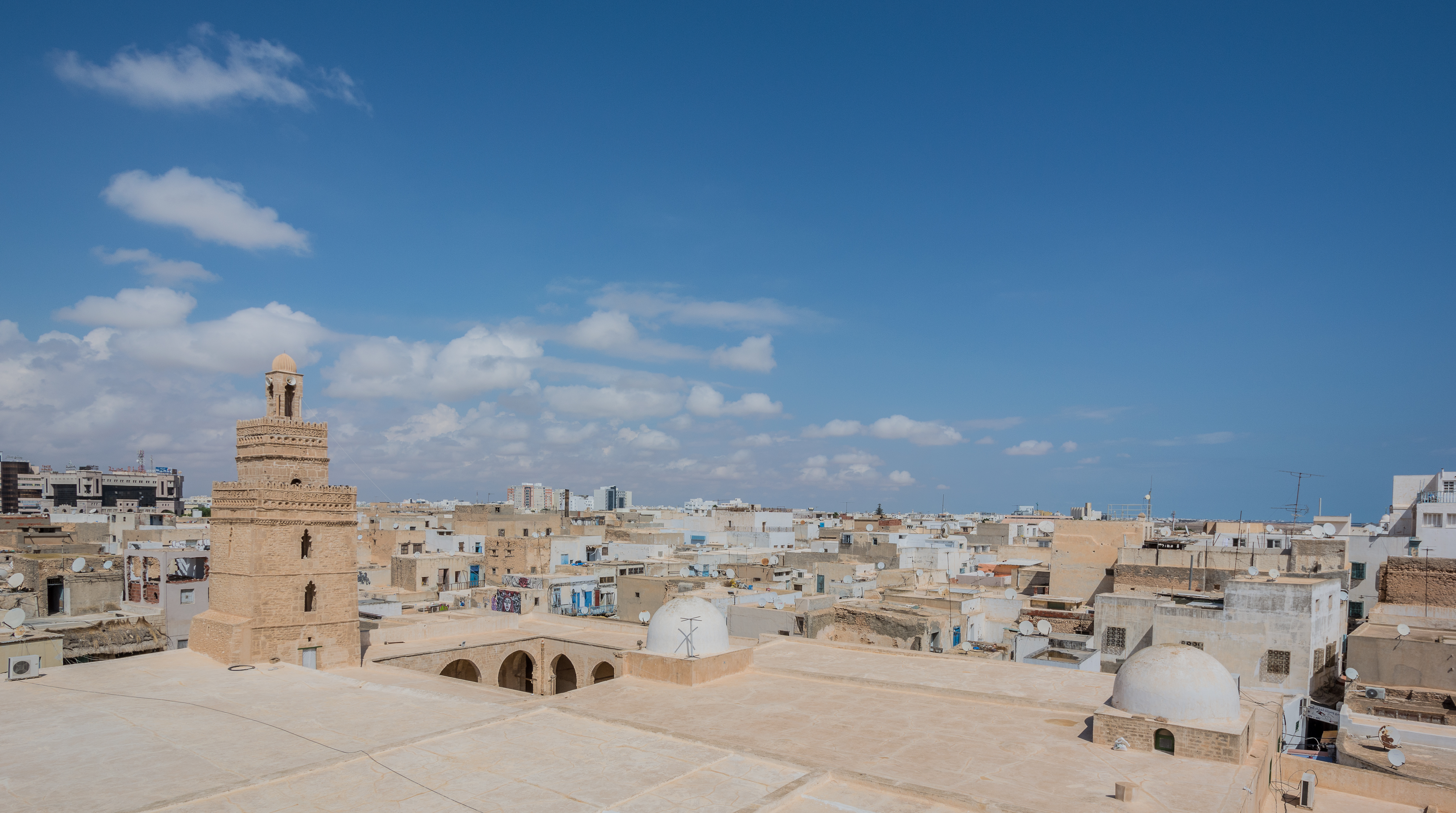
General view of the medina of Sfax with the Great Mosque of Sfax in the foreground

The Sfax medina is the medina quarter of the Tunisian city of Sfax. It was built by Aghlabid prince Abu Abbass Muhammad between 849 and 851. The medina is home to about 113,000 residents, and is dominated by the Great Mosque of Sfax.

On 12 February 2012, the Tunisian government submitted a nomination to add it on the UNESCO UNESCO World Heritage List. It is considered one of the rare medieval cities of North Africa to keep its original weft even with all the modifications of its buildings throughout the decades. It represents also the best example of the most conserved Arab-Muslim town planning in all the Mediterranean Basin. Its monuments are classified as national historical monuments since 1912.

== History ==
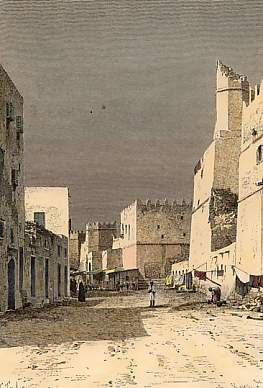
The medina of Sfax in 1886

Historic sources talk about the existence of a Roman city around the zone in which Sfax now exists called Taparura. The absence of tremendous monuments that used to distinguish Roman cities made it possible to think that either Sfax was built completely above Taparura, or that Taparura was not much more than a watchtower as its name exactly means in Greek, and so does "Ksar-Esfakez", original form of Sfax's name in berber-punic. What is however very likely is that the former Taparura is associated with the Arab-era Kasbah.

According to the inscriptions at the facade of the great mosque, the medina of Sfax was founded following the orders of the Aghlabid emir (prince) of Kairouan Abu Abbass Muhammad in 849, by Ali Ibn Salem, cadi of Sfax. In fact, in the middle of the ninth century, the Aghlabids who used to rule Ifrikia agreed on supporting the city's shores with forts and trusses, that's when Borj Sfax or Kasbah of Sfax was built as one of the forts, but as time passed and life evolved around it the Aghlabid decided to build the city of Sfax.

=== Fatimid era ===
With the fall of the majority of the Aghlabid State in the hands of the Fatimids, Sfax suffered its first crisis since its foundation, when attacked among other cities in 914 by the ruler of Sicily, Ahmed bin Gharb, a strong supporter of the Abbasids, in order to recover the cities of the African coast held by the Fatimids. This conflict ended with the victory of the Sicilian army and the destruction of the city as a punishment upon its inhabitants, even if the Fatimids quickly took control of the city thereafter. However, the locals did not integrate the Ismaili rite brought by the new state and remained faithful to their Maliki doctrine thanks to the support of a great scholar, Abu Ishaq Aljbinyani.

=== Zirid era ===
After the transfer of the center of Fatimid power to Cairo, the Zirid governors decided to separate from the Fatimid rule and return to sunnism, prompting the Fatimids to seek revenge by sending Arab tribes from the south to destroy Ifriqiya.

Despite all these disturbances, Sfax saw an important cultural renaissance especially an architectural one during the reign of the Zirids. One of the most significant changes taking place in the city during this period is the remarkable improvement that the great mosque underwent under the rule of the Sanhaji Prince Abi Al-Fotuh Al-Mansour in 988.

In 977, the traveler Ibn Hawqal described the city as: "surrounded by a beautiful olive grove. The oil that is made here is exported to Egypt, the Maghreb, Sicily and Europe (Roum) [...] Kerkennah contains some remains of old buildings and several cisterns. As this island is very fertile, the inhabitants of Sfax send their cattle there to graze ".

During this time also, the city witnessed its first invasion when it passed under the control of Ibn Melil from 1067 to 1099 with the support of Hilalis and Banu Sulaym.

=== Norman invasion ===
At the end of the reign of the Zirid dynasty, between 1148 and 1156, the Normans of Sicily occupied the city, representing Sfax's first non-Islamic occupation since its foundation. This conflict ended with the execution of Sheikh Abu El Hassan El Feriani by the Normans, but on the other hand, Sfax got its independence with Omar Feriani, son of the Sheikh until the arrival of the Almohads from Morocco.

=== Almohad era ===
The Almohads ruled Sfax from 1159 to 1198. During these 39 years, the city saw several crises. It was not until 1204 that the situation stabilized thanks to the intervention of Emir Muhammad al-Nasir who eliminated the Banu Ghania, who were behind many of the local conflicts. During this period of stability, 366 wells were dug in a place near the medina, that took later the name of Al Nasiriya, named after the Emir.

=== Hafsid era ===
From 1207 until the 16th century, the members of the Hafid dynasty succeeded at the throne of Ifriqyia, choosing Tunis as the capital. Sfax quickly joined the new kingdom after some resistance, and it is during this period that its monuments were restored and that the trade movement developed. Sfaxian products became exported to several destinations such as Istanbul, Damascus and Orient as well as Marseille and Genoa. And as the Hafsids have lost a large part of Andalusia, many of the region's families traveled to settle in the kingdom's cities like Sfax; We can cite the example of the Charfi family known to its scientists, the Mnif family, an important reference when it comes to local architectural works, or the Zghal family from the emir Mohammed XIII az-Zaghall.

=== Ottoman era ===
In 1551, Sfax passed into the hands of the Ottomans following a conquest led by Dragut. But it was only 37 years later that they settled permanently in the city until 1864.

==== Reign of the Mouradids ====
At the time of the Mouradid dynasty, Sfax experienced an important intellectual renaissance: several scholars and scholars emerged, including Abu El Hassan El Karray and Ali Ennouri who led the jihadist movement against the cross occupation of the order of Saint John in Malta. These two scholars established their own Medersas where they promoted science in the city until it became one of the most important destinations for students.

==== Kingdom of Husainids ====
Sfax lived an important urban development with the arrival of the Husainid dynasty to the power. In fact, it was not until the 17th century that the first extra-muros buildings appeared. Towards the 18th century, gardens appeared, forming a belt around the medina, while a suburb began to develop on the side of the sea. It was during this period that Mahmoud Megdiche published his book, Nuzhat Al Anthar fi Ajaibi Tawarikh wa Al Akhbar, which remains today an important reference on the history of Sfax.

Moreover, the city faced several battles like the battle of Rass El Makhbez in 1747 against the Republic of Venice.

=== French Protectorate ===
With the establishment of the French protectorate in 1881, several cities in Tunisia choose the path of resistance. Among these cities, Sfax, whose inhabitants continue to protest and defend themselves, even more than two months after the signing of the Bardo Treaty.

While Ali Ben Khelifa El Naffati lead the army to defend the city from the outside, the inhabitants fight from the inside under the leadership of Mohammad Kammoun. It was not until 16 July 1881 that the French soldiers managed to defeat the Protestants and entered the medina to settle there for a period of 75 years. They made the kasbah their headquarter and used the patio of the big mosque as a stable for their horses.

Gradually, the medina lost its role at the expense of a new European city built by the French and became the center of all transactions and even a large part of the local economy.

=== Modern era ===
On 17 February 2012, the Tunisian government presented the medina of Sfax as a candidate for ranking on the UNESCO World Heritage List.

== Architecture ==
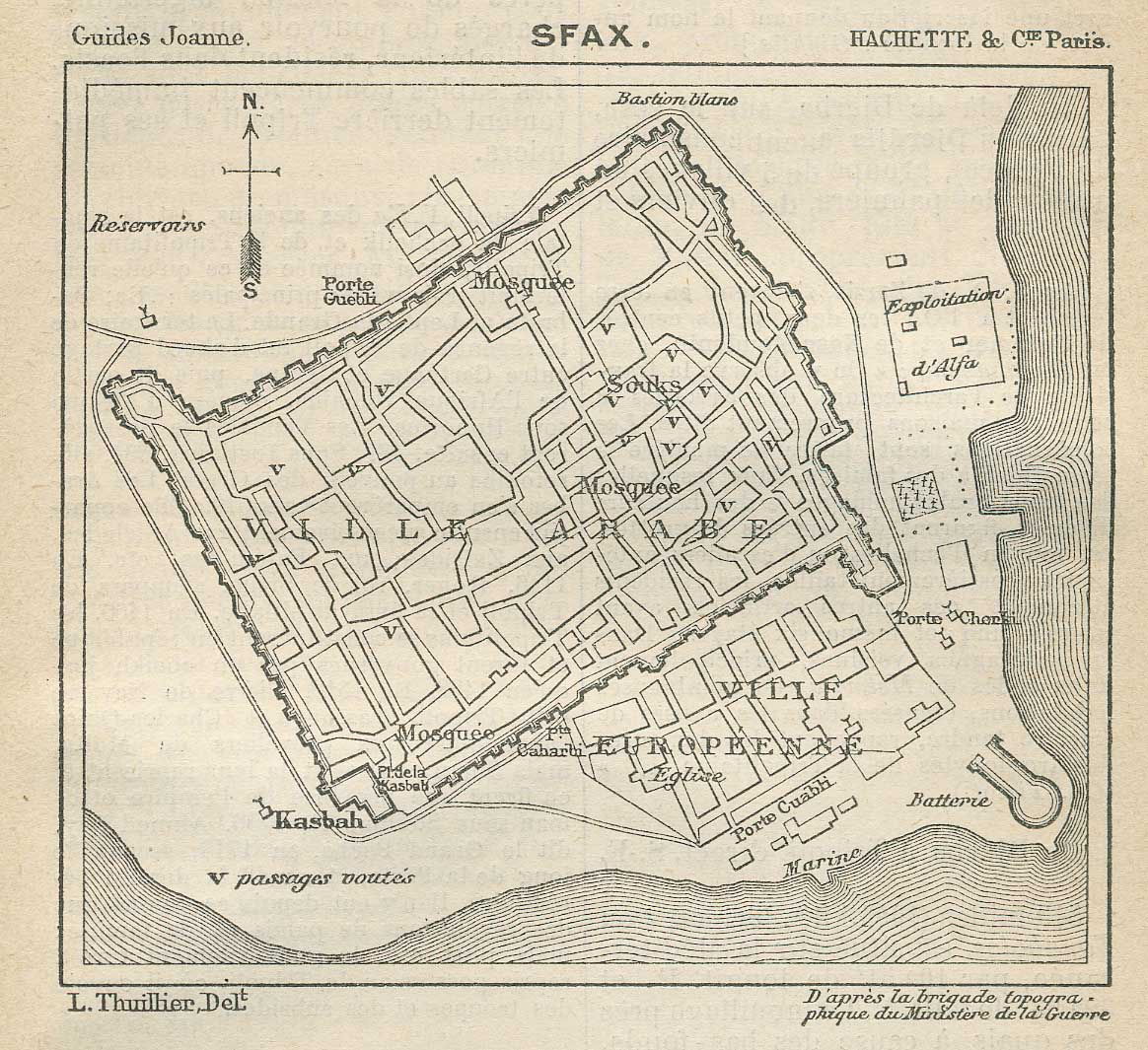
Urban plan of the medina of Sfax

The medina of Sfax has basically the shape of a 24 hectares slightly deformed quadrilateral, limited by walls measuring 600 meters from west to east and 400 to 450 meters from north to south.The walls are consolidated by 67 towers with various shapes: semi-round, octagonal, hexagonals, barlongs or sloping.

The great mosque occupies the centre of the city. It is located in the intersection of its two main arteries: the one linking Bab Jebli with Bab Diwan, and the west–east median artery. The first one represents the main axis which makes with the meridian north-south an angle of 22 degrees, which corresponds to the orientation of most mihrabs mosques of Sfax. This characteristic made the medina of Sfax the unique city that recalls the urban organization of Kufa, the first Arab-Muslim city.

The souks (or markets) surround the great mosque, at once place of worship, culture and sociability, from its north-west facade to Bab Jebli with a hierarchical distribution, while the rest of the area is occupied by the residential quarters.

=== Walls and gates ===
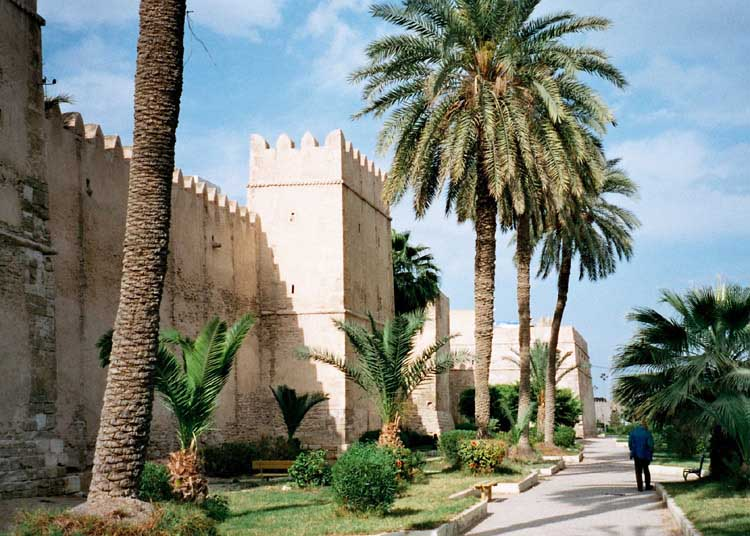
Walls of the medina

Apart from Borj Ennar and three other towers that disappeared, the walls of the medina kept the same original architecture since 1306. These are 2,750 meters long and have 34 dungeons. Their height varies between seven and eleven meters.

Originally, the medina had only two doors: Bab Jebli, also known as Bab Dhahraoui (Northern door), and Bab Diwan or Bab Bhar (the sea door). Yet, in the 20th century and because of the economic development and the huge increase of the population, new doors had to be created in order to reduce the flow from these two main doors such as Bab El Ksar and Bab Jebli Jedid.

Each newly built door was temporarily assigned the name of Bab Jedid (New Door), while waiting to find a suitable final name.

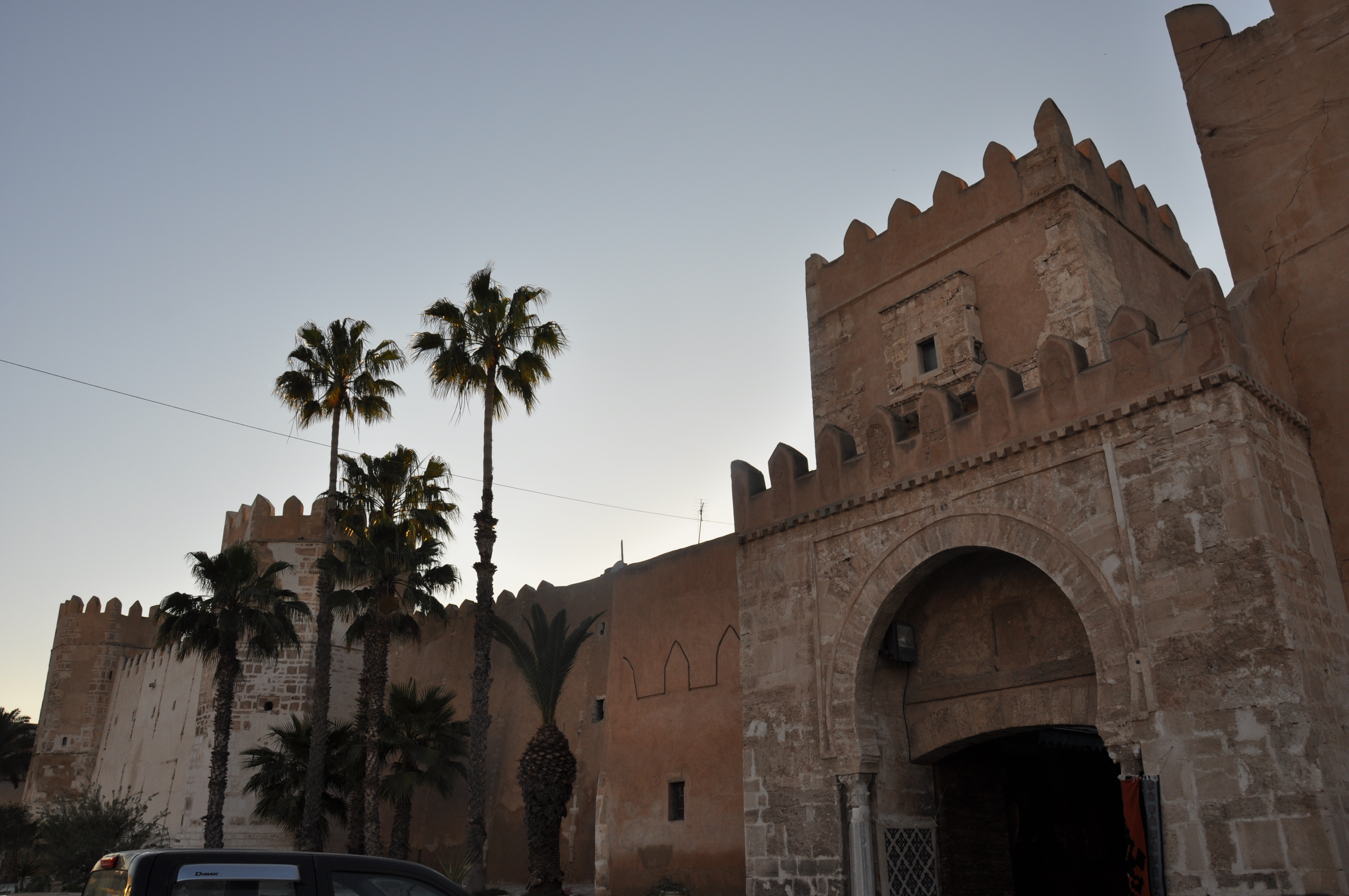
Bab Diwan

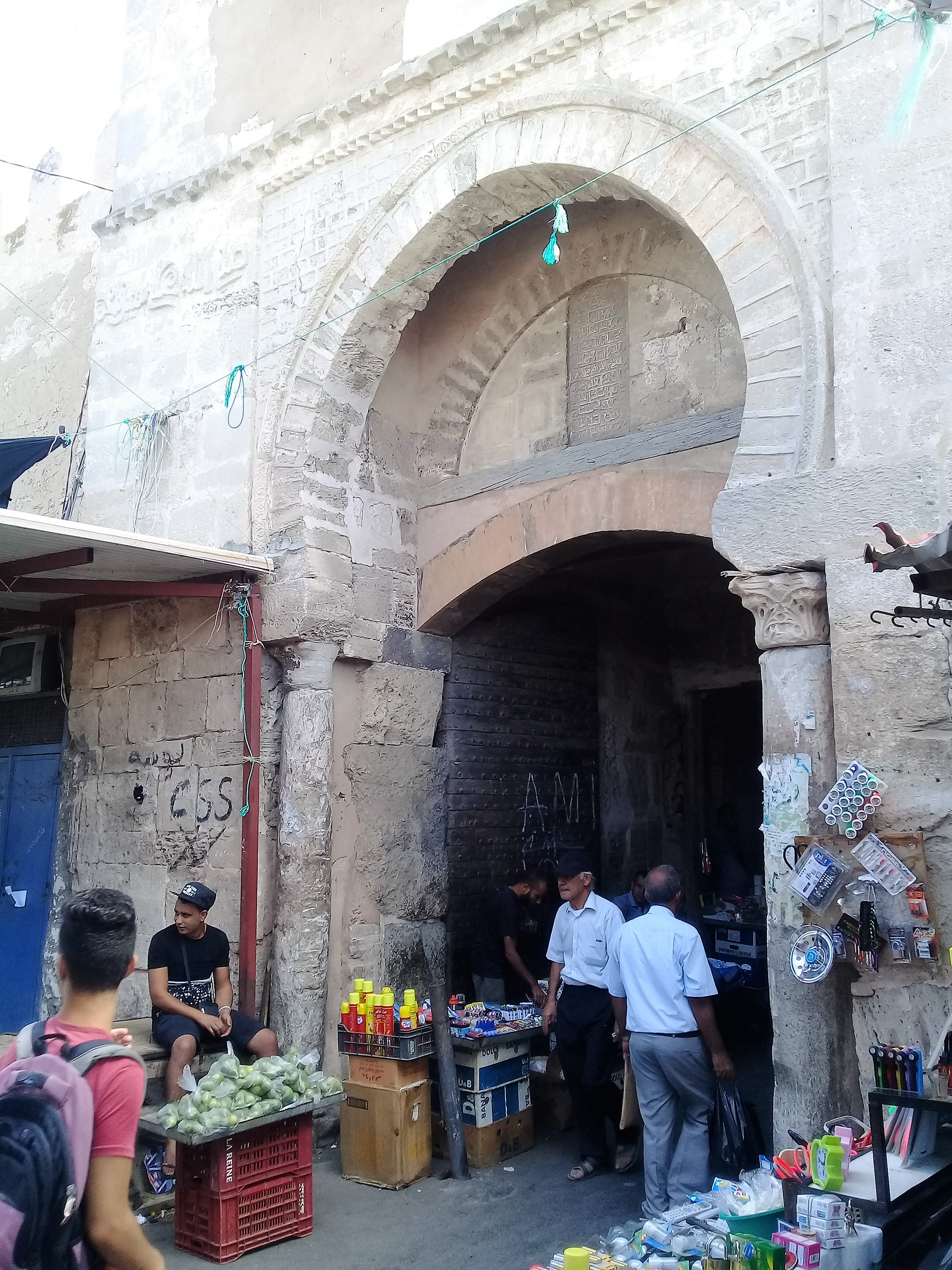
Bab Jebli

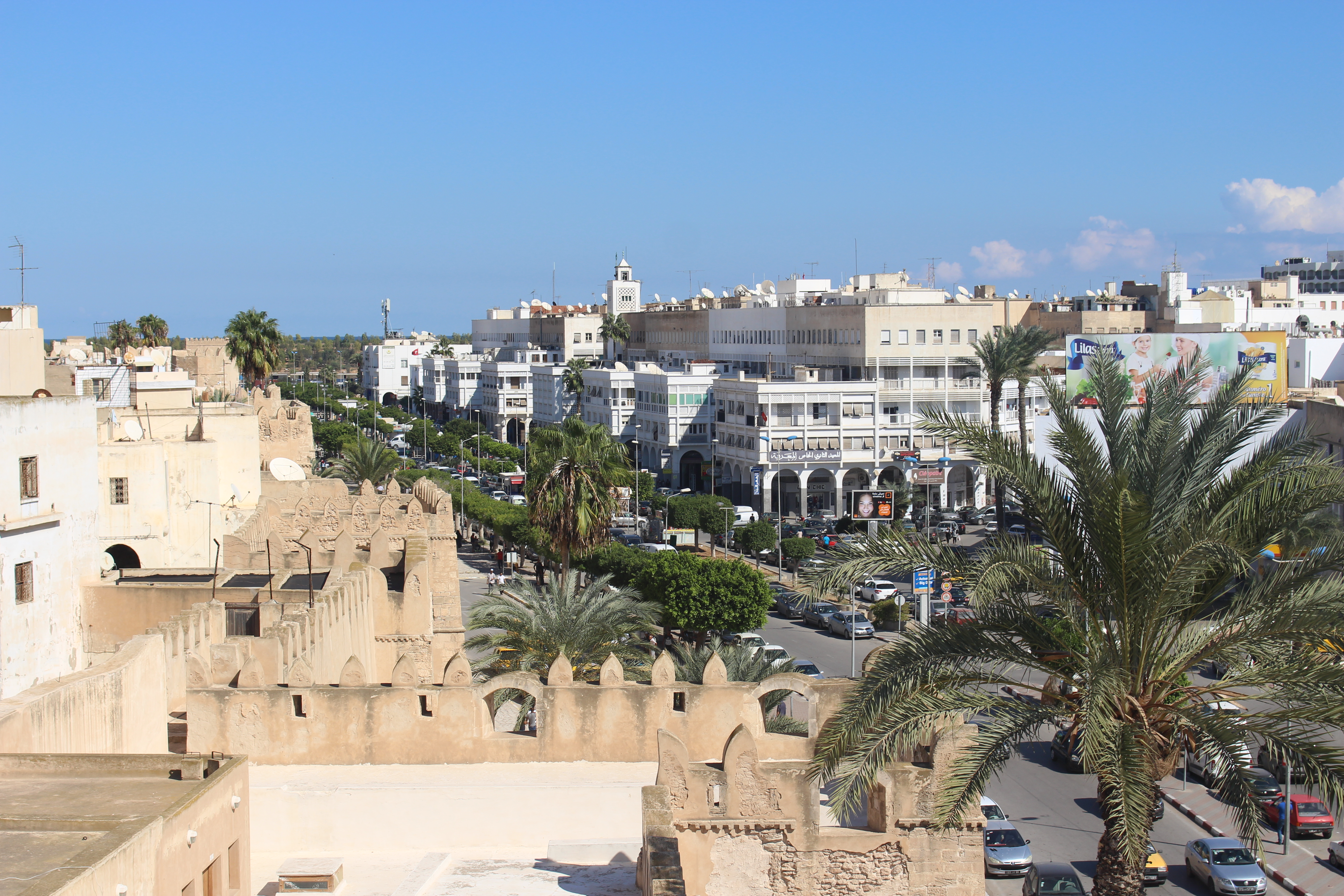
Separation between the old city and the modern quarter

=== Kasbah ===
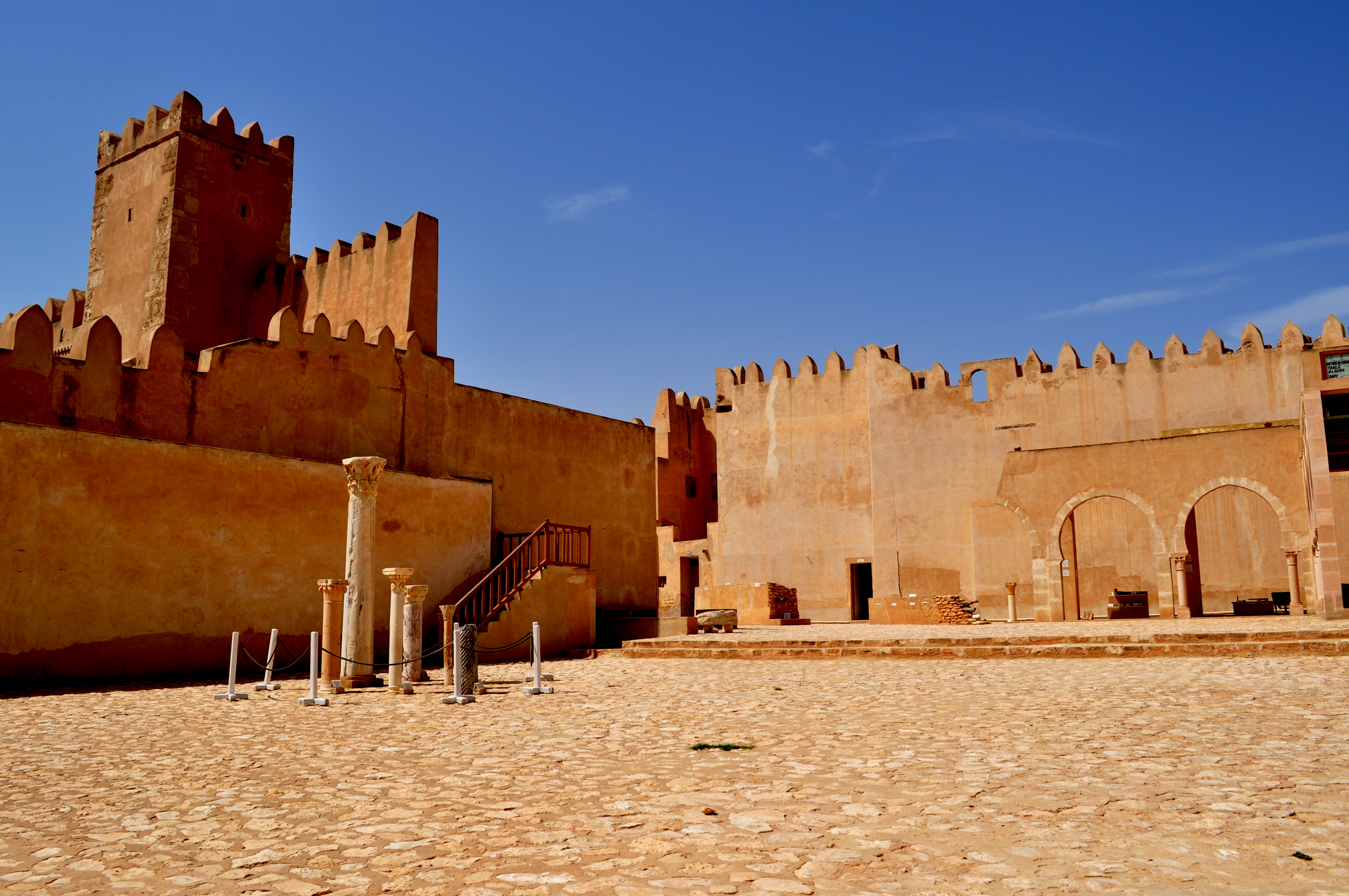
Kasbah of Sfax

Like most of the other medinas of Tunisia, Sfax has its own kasbah. It is desert fortress, located in the southwestern corner of the medina. It was used for a different purposes throughout the history, first a control tower built by the Aghlabids on the coast, then the seat of the municipal government, and then the main army barracks. Its construction was preceded by the deployment of the wall and the medina quarter. Today it is served as a museum of traditional architecture

=== Souks ===
Souks (or markets), are organized in the medina according to their specialties or activities. All of them are located in the north of the great mosque, creating the economic centre of the city.

From the 18th century, these souks started having names. Currently, the medina of Sfax has about 30 different souks. Souk Erbaa, main market of chechias and woolen weaves trading, represents the most important one. It consists of a main north–south artery, crossed by an east–west median street. Nowadays, Souk Erbaa is more oriented into selling traditional clothes.

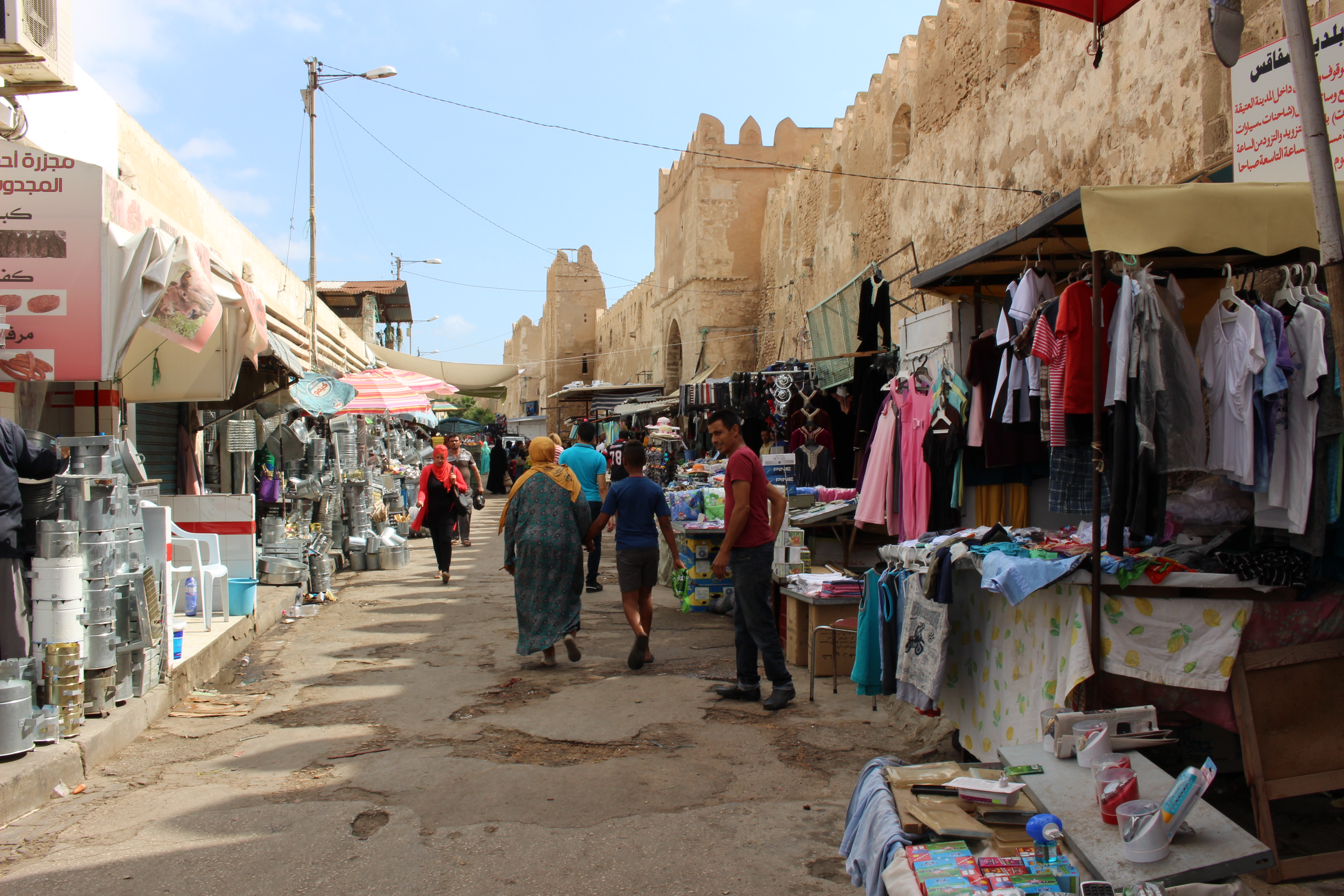
Souk Kriaa merchants

Among the other souks of the medina of Sfax, there are:

- Souk Kriaa
- Souk Kamour
- Souk Haddadine
- Souk El Kach
- Souk El Touma
- Souk El Jomaa

=== Mausoleums ===
Like all the other Islamic cities in the Arab world, the medina of Sfax had its own saints that in order to cherish, citizens, and in some cases themselves, has built mausoleums.

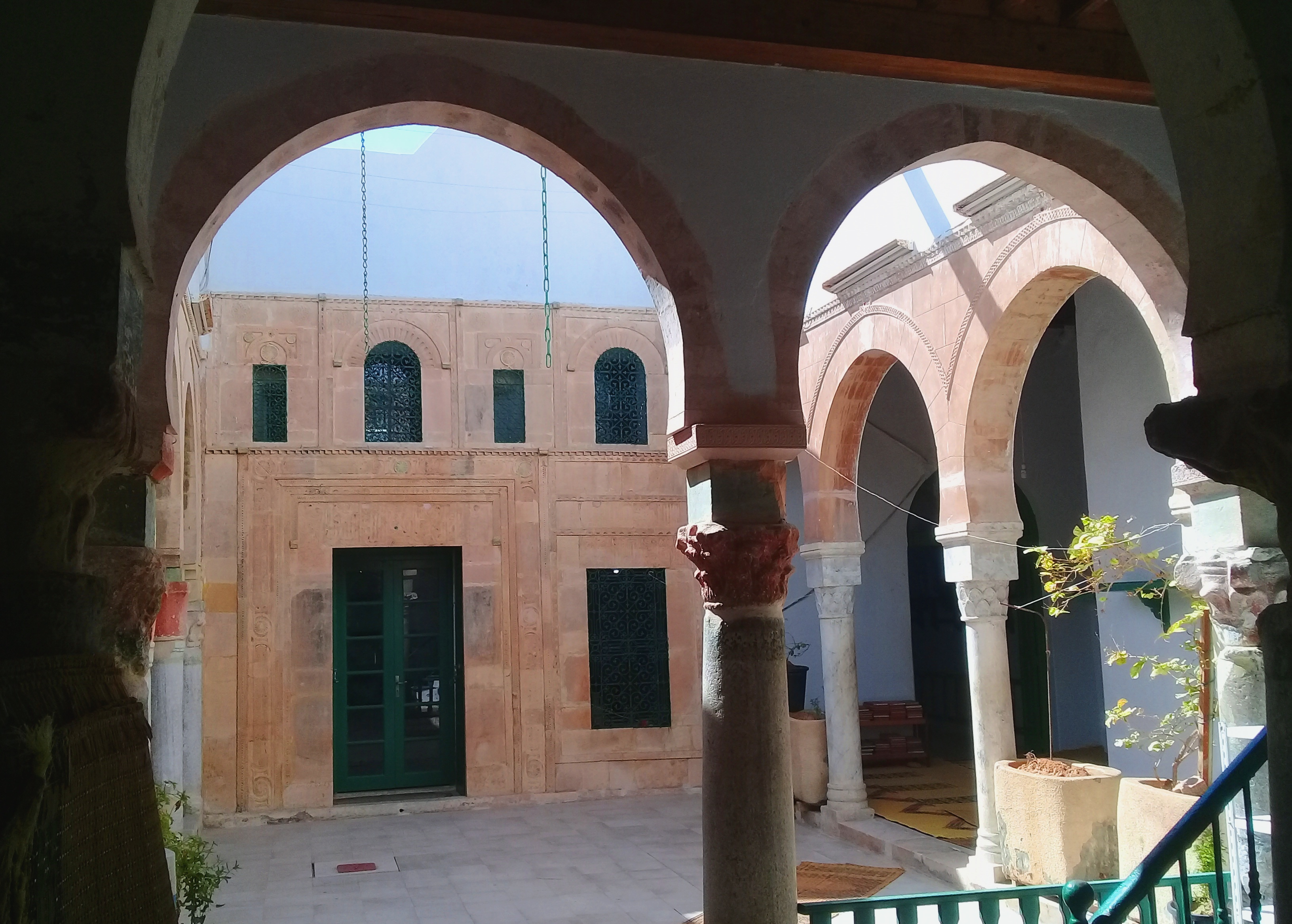
Sidi Belhassen Karray Mausoleum

Among these mausoleums there are:

- Sidi Amar Kammoun mausoleum
- Sidi Ali Ennouri mausoleum
- Sidi Belhassen Karray mausoleum
- Sidi Saada mausoleum
- Sidi Ali Karray mausoleum
- Sidi Lakhmi mausoleum (outside the walls of the medina, near Bab Jebli)

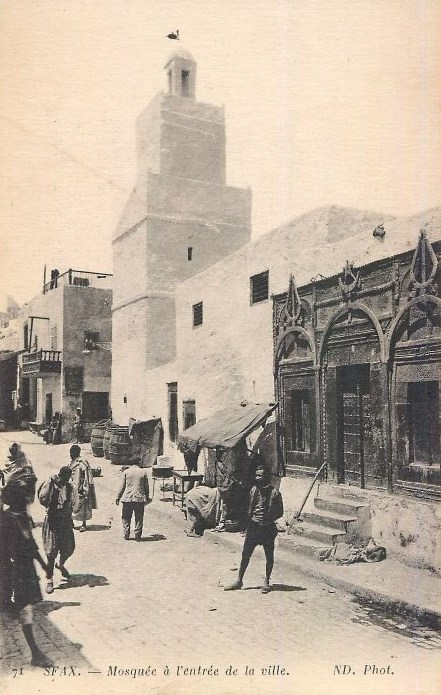
Old photo of Ajouzine mosque

=== Mosques ===
The medina of Sfax has a very big number of mosques and prayer rooms (nomination that depends on whether the building can host the Friday prayer or not), maliki for the majority.The architecture of these buildings reflect the dynasties that ruled the city.

The great mosque, the city's oldest and most important mosque, represents its center. It is surrounded by the rest of the mosques that for many of them, are part of a larger religious compound among with a mausoleum and a madrasa.

Among these mosques still standing we can cite:

- El Ajouzine Mosque
- Bouchouaicha Mosque
- Driba Mosque
- Sidi Elyes Mosque

=== Domestic architecture ===
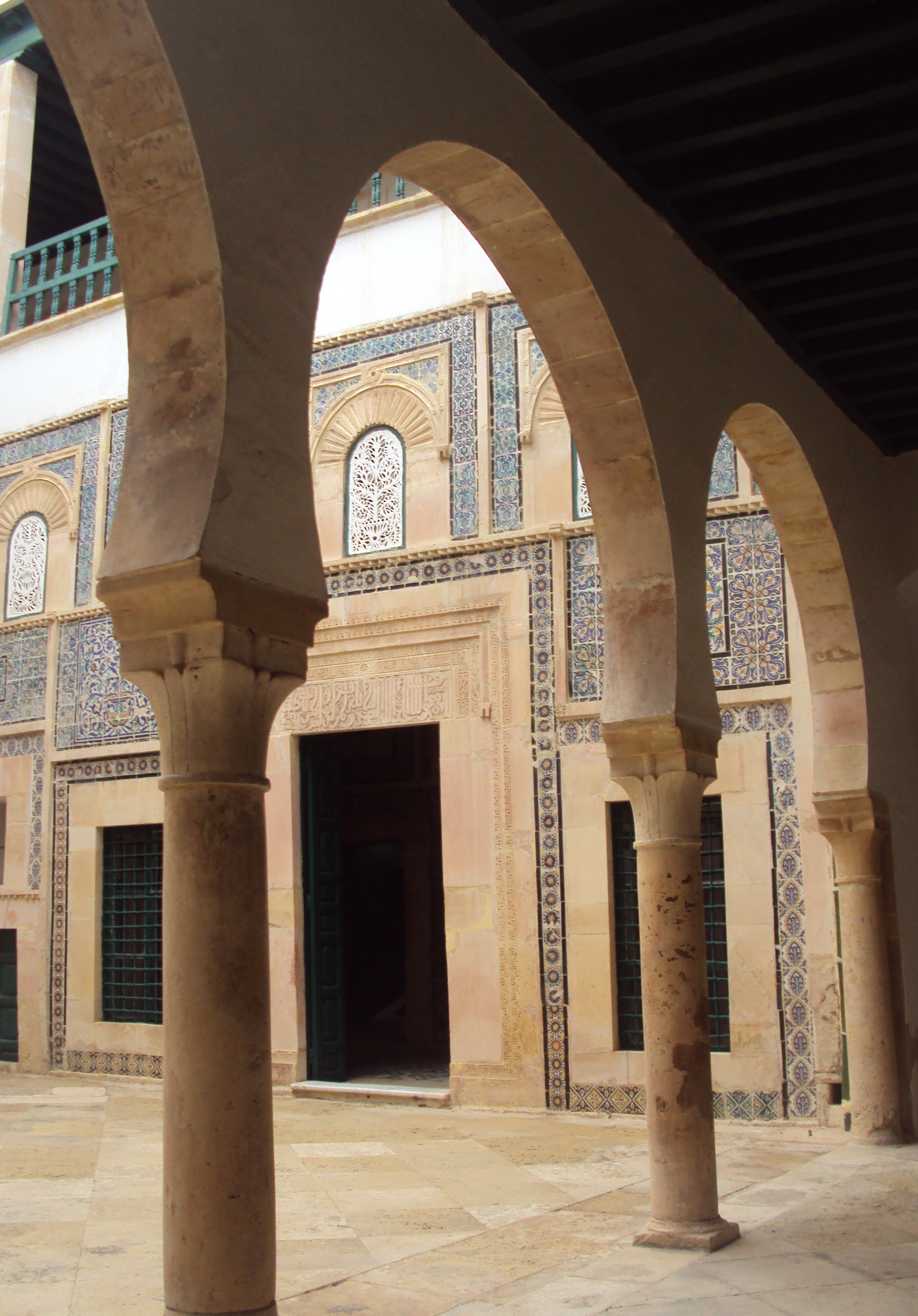
Alley in Dar Jellouli

The houses of the medina in Sfax have a common architecture that is called El Dar. It is constituted of a vestibule (Skifa) that gives access through a lateral alley (Bortal) to a central hall or patio. The patio's decoration and dimensions often reflect the family's social status and wealth. In most of the cases, the kitchen can be accessed by the Bortal while the rest of the rooms open on the patio. The rooms always have a rectangular shape and are characterized by their high roof that provides natural air conditioning. In some houses, the rooms have a T shape with an extra central space in each room called Kbou used to welcome guests, and 2 extra lateral cells called Maksoura for the kids. Starting from the 18th century, and with the important development of the local population, a new element started to appear in the domestic architecture: the first floor (Ali in Tunisian dialect). The latter can be an extension of the ground floor or a habitation totally separated from the main one with an entrance that can be separated in the street or in the Skifa.

Most of nowadays' houses in the medina of Sfax were built between the 17th and 18th centuries, period during which the city witnessed the biggest phase of its economic development, something that allowed the citizens to renovate their houses.

Some of these buildings kept their original function (housing) like Dar Laadhar, while many other got converted into hotels, coffee shops, or even artisans workshops. Among them we can mention:

- Dar Affes
- Dar Jallouli
- Dar Kharrat (current Dar Of the Coran)
- Dar Kammoun
- Dar Khemakhem
- Dar Frikha

=== Hammams ===
Unlike many other medinas of Tunisia, and because of its climate condition, the medina of Sfax has a very reduced number of hammams. According to the historian Mahmoud Megdiche, the city had only four, which are: Hammam El Sultan, Hammam El Mseddi, Hammam El West that belonged to the Fourati's family and Hammam Ibn Neji also known as Hamman El Sabbaghine. Apart from their hygienic role, these hammams had a very important social role as a space for meetings and a venue for many celebrations such as marriage and circumcision.

Nowadays, only Hammam El Sultan is still standing, but in poor condition due to lack of protection and renovation works.

== Monuments ==
The medina of Sfax has many monuments that are classified as national heritage monuments. These monuments are:

- The great mosque of Sfax (13 March 1912);
- The walls of the medina (13 March 1912);
- The Sidi Ilyes Minaret (25 January 1922);
- Sidi Omar Kammoun Minaret (25 January 1922);
- The facade of Dar Mezghanni (25 January 1922);
- Prayer room of Sidi Bahri (25 January 1922);
- The old Driba (16 November 1928)
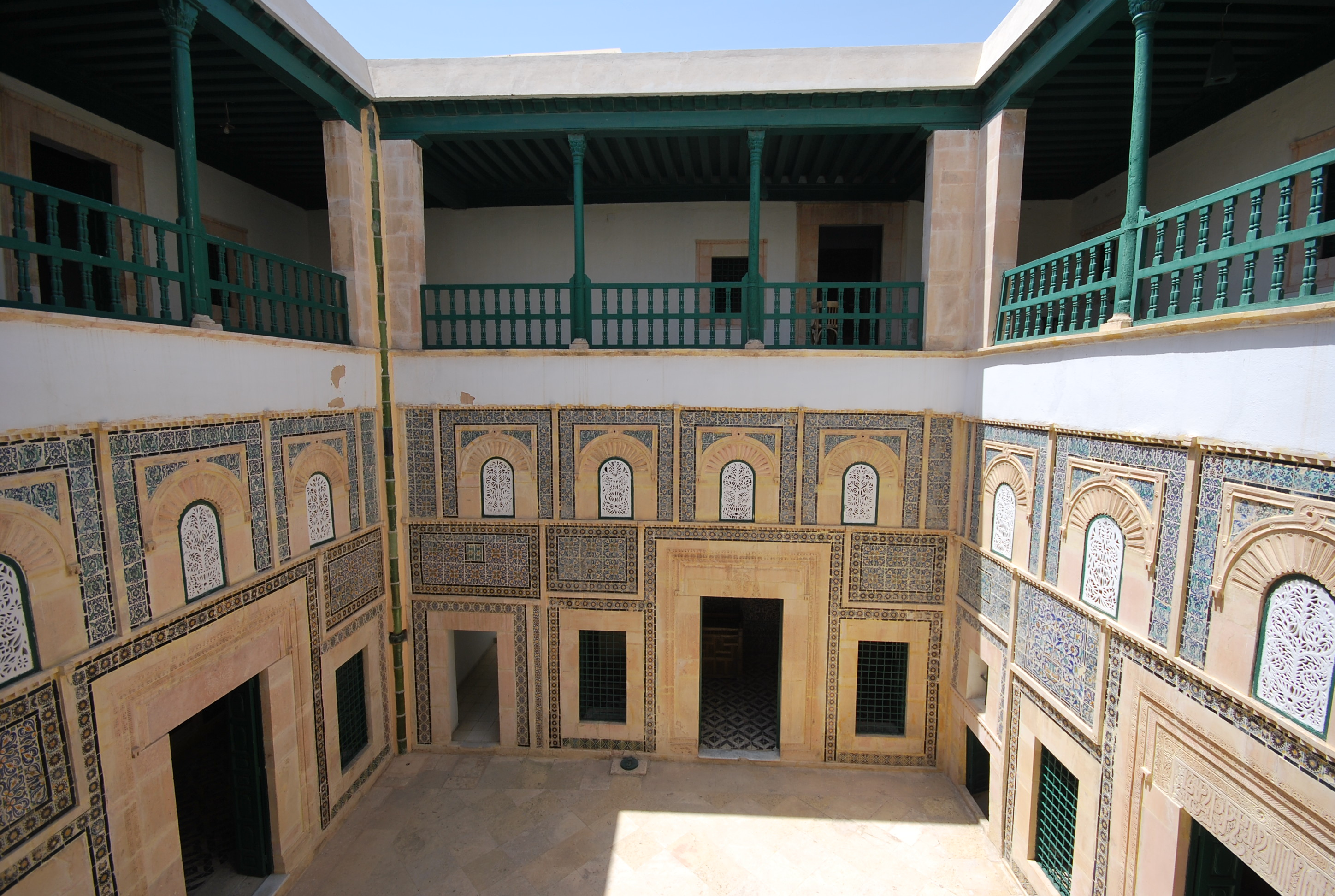
The old Driba

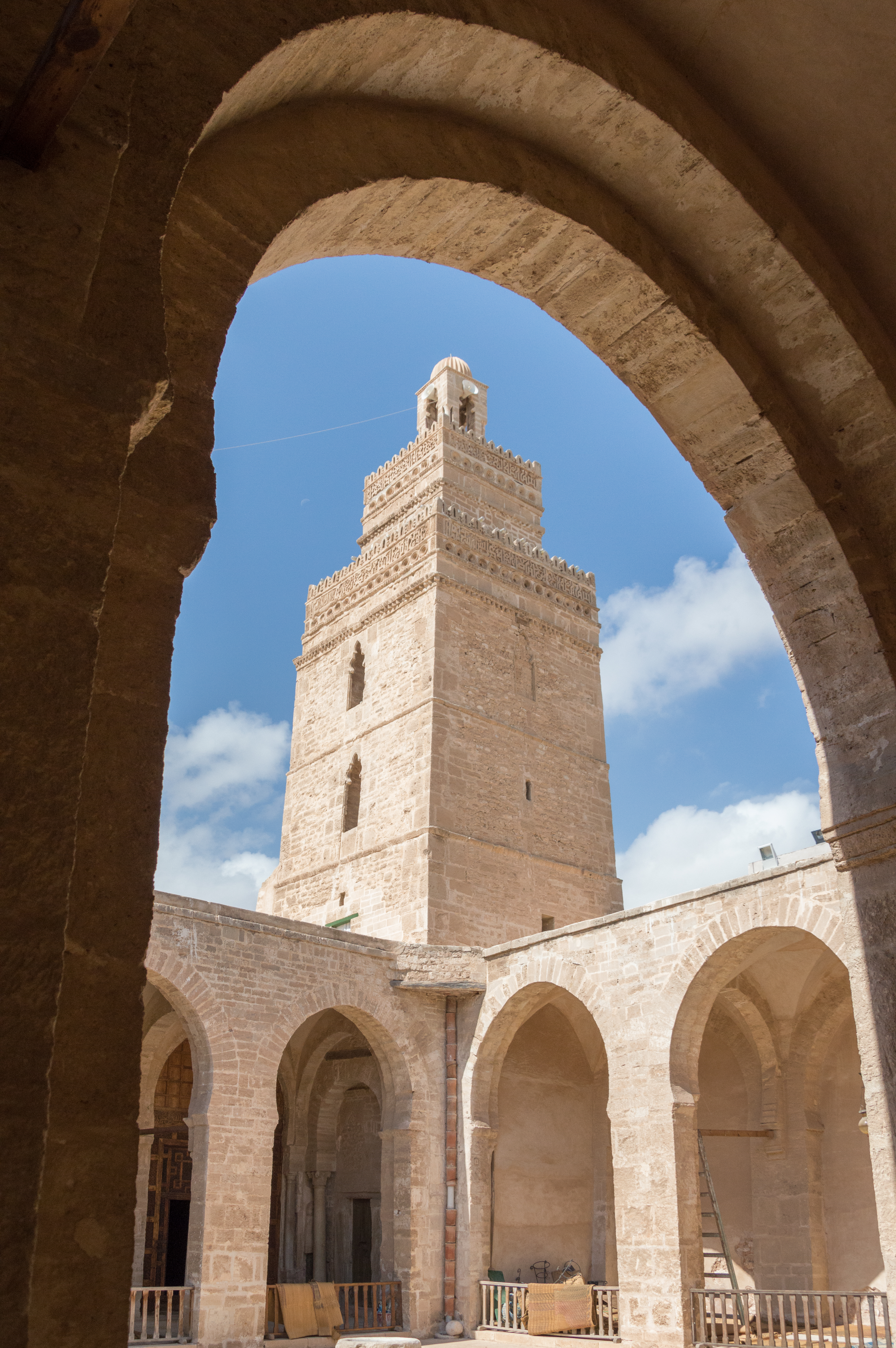
The great mosque of Sfax

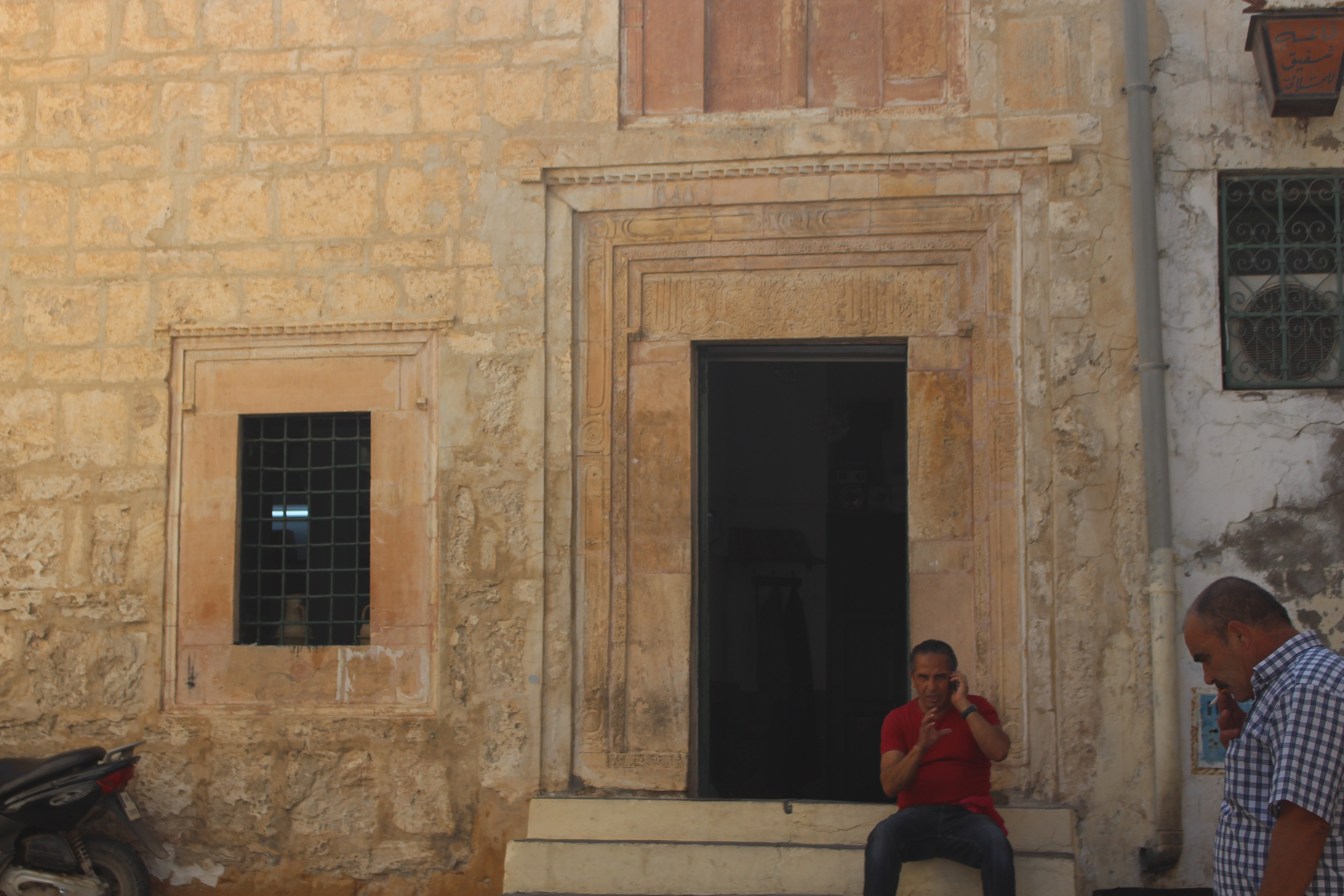
Sidi Bahri Mosque
