= Sidi Amar Kammoun Mosque =

Mosque in Sfax, Tunisia

Sidi Amor Kammoun Mosque
- جامع سيدي عمر كمون
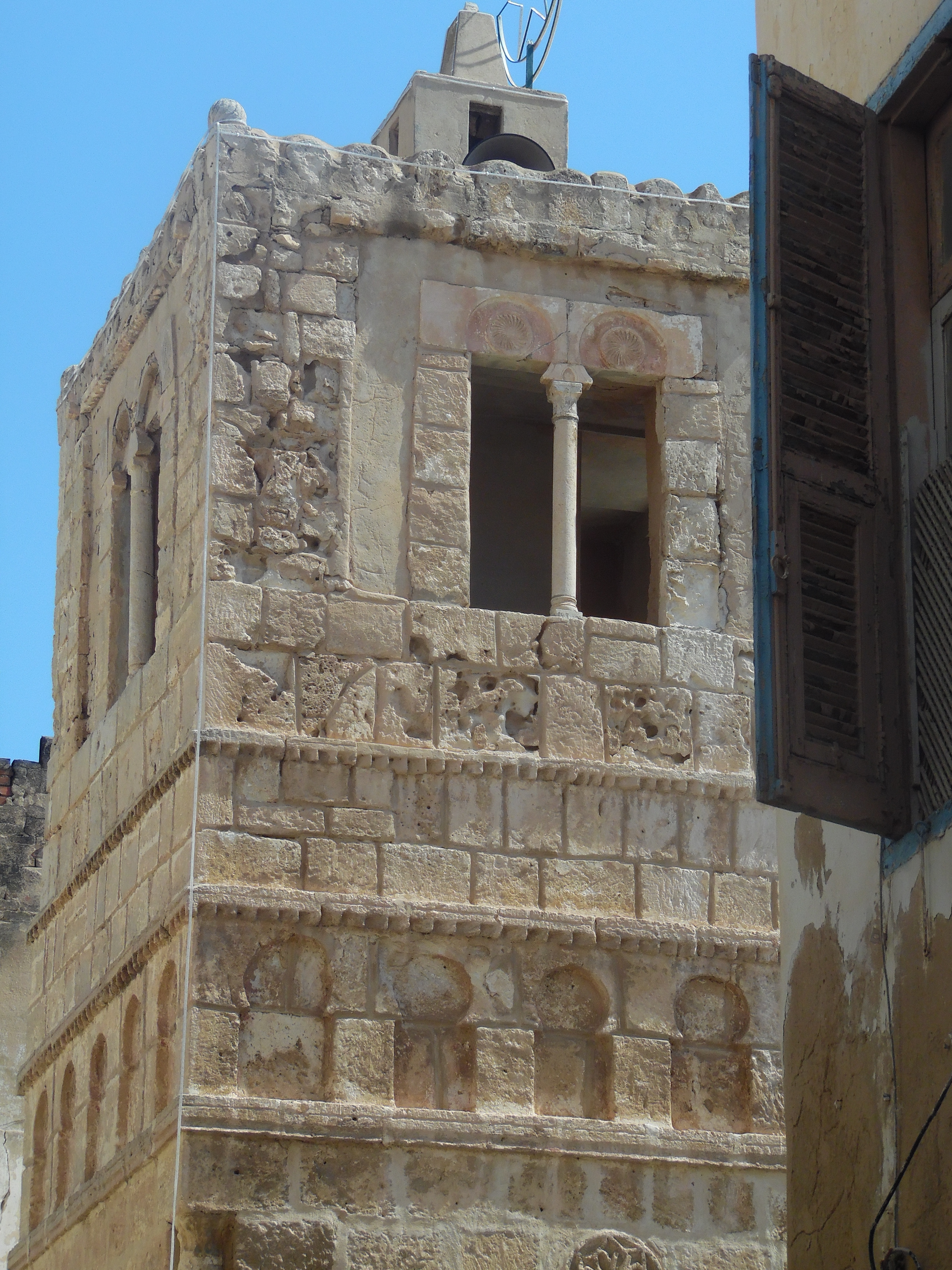

- Location within Tunisia

Religion
- Affiliation: Islam

Location
- Municipality: Medina of Sfax
- Country: Tunisia
- Interactive map of Sidi Amor Kammoun Mosque
- Coordinates: 34.7353°N 10.7632°E

Architecture
- Type: mosque

Sidi Amar Kammoun mosque (Arabic: جامع سيدي عمر كمون) is one of the most important and famous mosques of the medina of Sfax, Tunisia.

== Localisation ==
The mosque is located in Borj Ennar Street near Bab Diwan. It is integrated as part of the Sidi Amar Kammoun mausoleum.

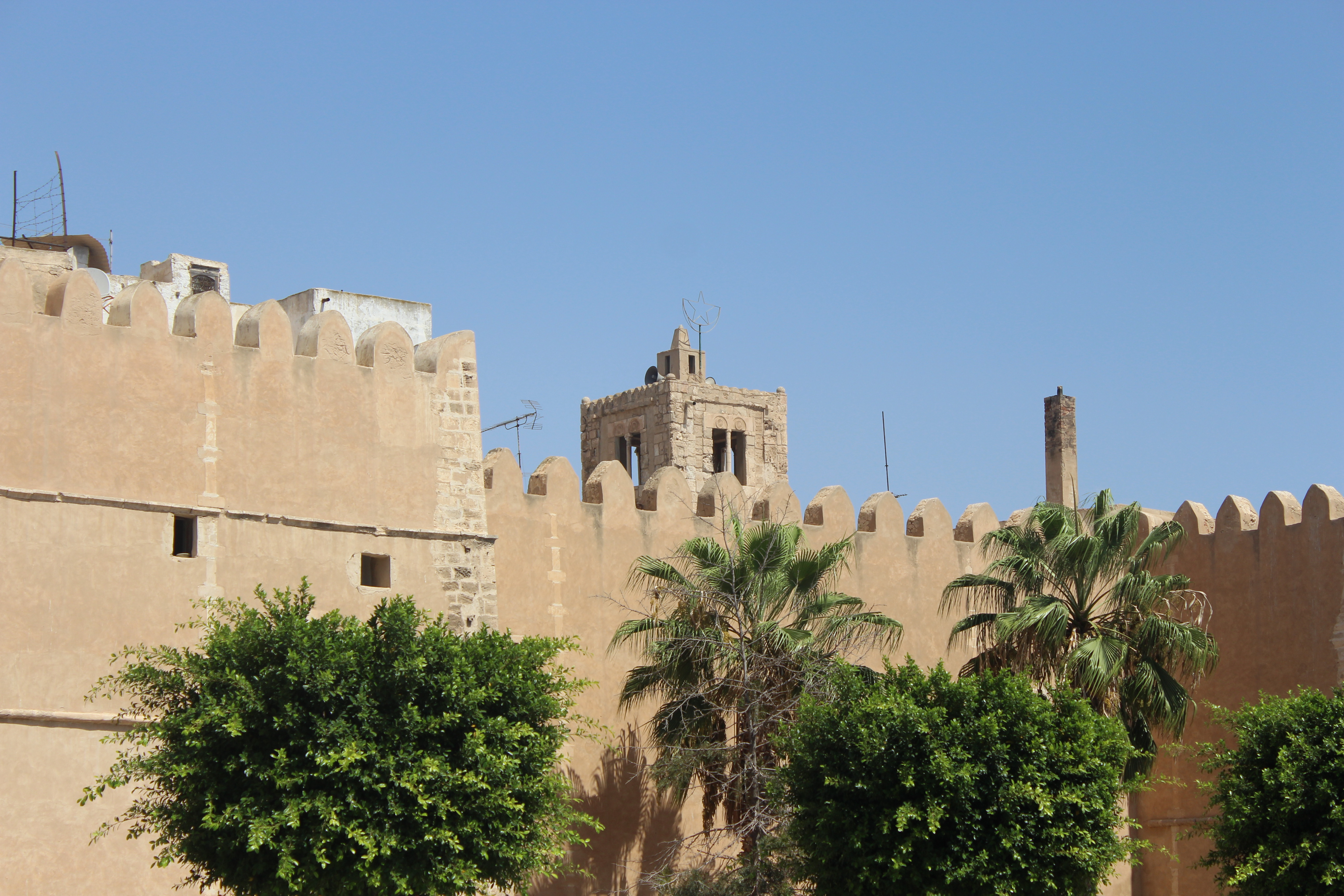
Minaret of the mosque from the outside of the medina

== History ==
The first part of the mosque was built in 1630 following the orders of Mourad Bey. The minaret was added later by the saint Sidi Amar Kammoun himself in 1659.

Apart from its religious function, the building played a huge defensive role during wars as it provided the soldiers with a full clear view of the coastal facade of the medina from the minaret.

== See also ==
- Sidi Amar Kammoun Mausoleum
