= Bab El Kasbah =

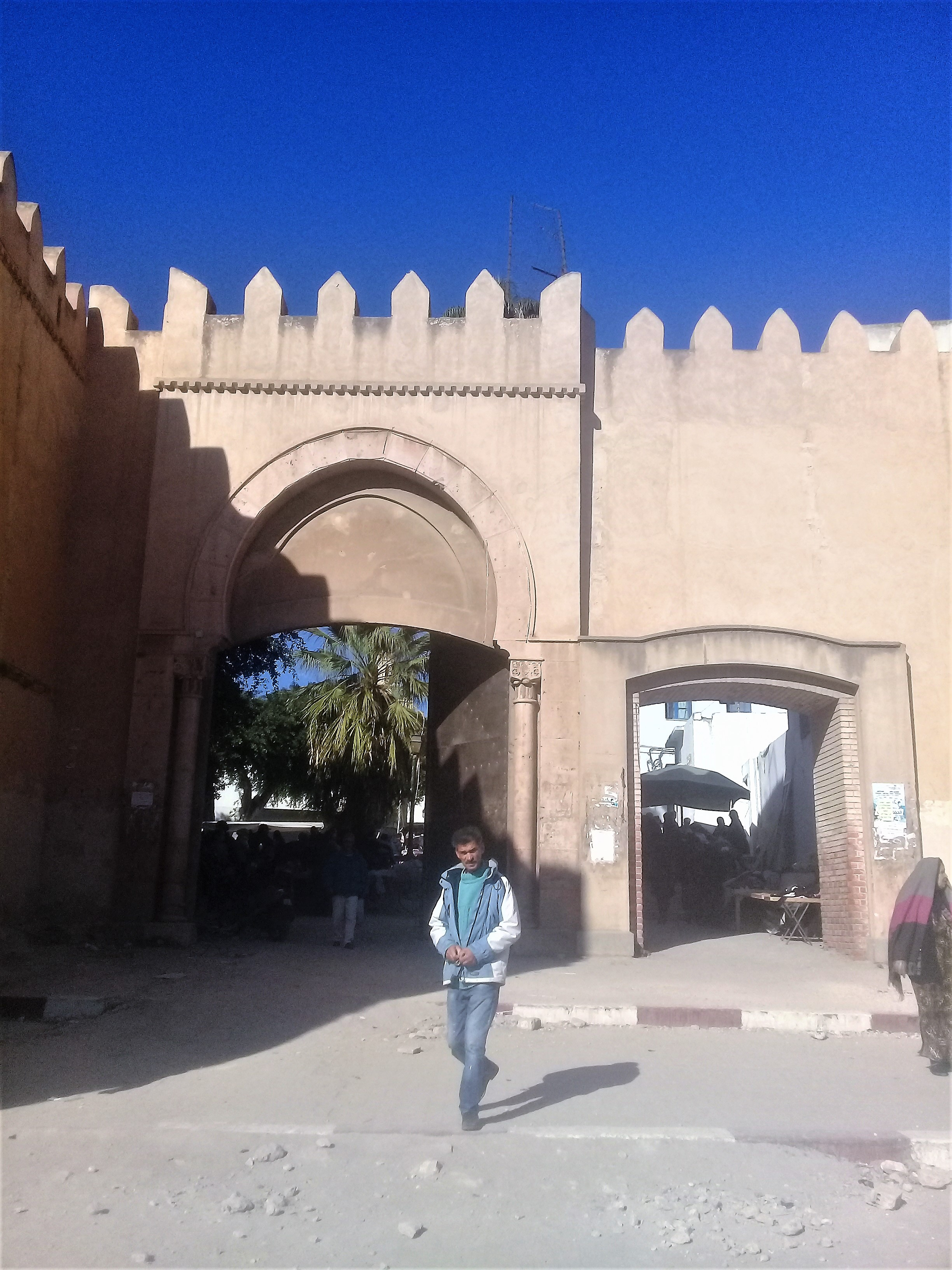
Bab El Kasbah

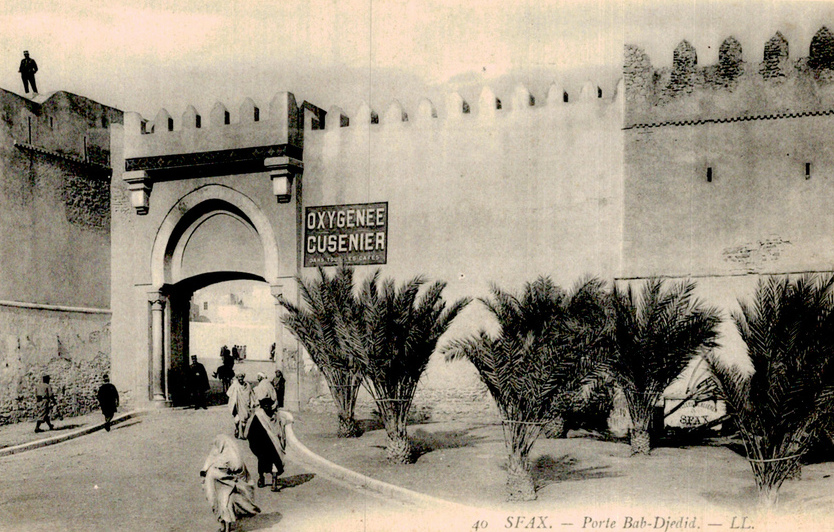
Bab El Kasbah in the 20th century

Bab El Kasbah (Arabic: باب القصبة) is one of the gates of the Medina of Sfax, located in the west of its walls southern facade and gives access to its kasbah.

== Etymology ==
Originally, it was called Bab Jedid (the new door), as it was the first gate to be built in the end of the 19th century, more than 1000 years after bab Jebli and Bab Diwan, the medina's oldest gates. The gate got its current designation from the Kasbah located at its east.

== History ==
The main purpose behind this new entrance was to decrease the flood of passengers through the two other gates and facilitate the exchange with the colonial district of Bab Bhar. After its renovation in 1960, Bab El Kasbah got provided by a smaller second entrance just next to it.

== Description ==
Bab El Kasbah gives access to a square delimited by Sidi Ilyes mosque in the front of the gate, the cheikh Meftah Mausoleum and the Madrasa Abbassiya in the east and the Kasbah in the west. From the outer side, the door overlooks The resistance square, Dakar's gardens and the Lycée technique through Ali Belhouane Avenue.

== Gallery ==
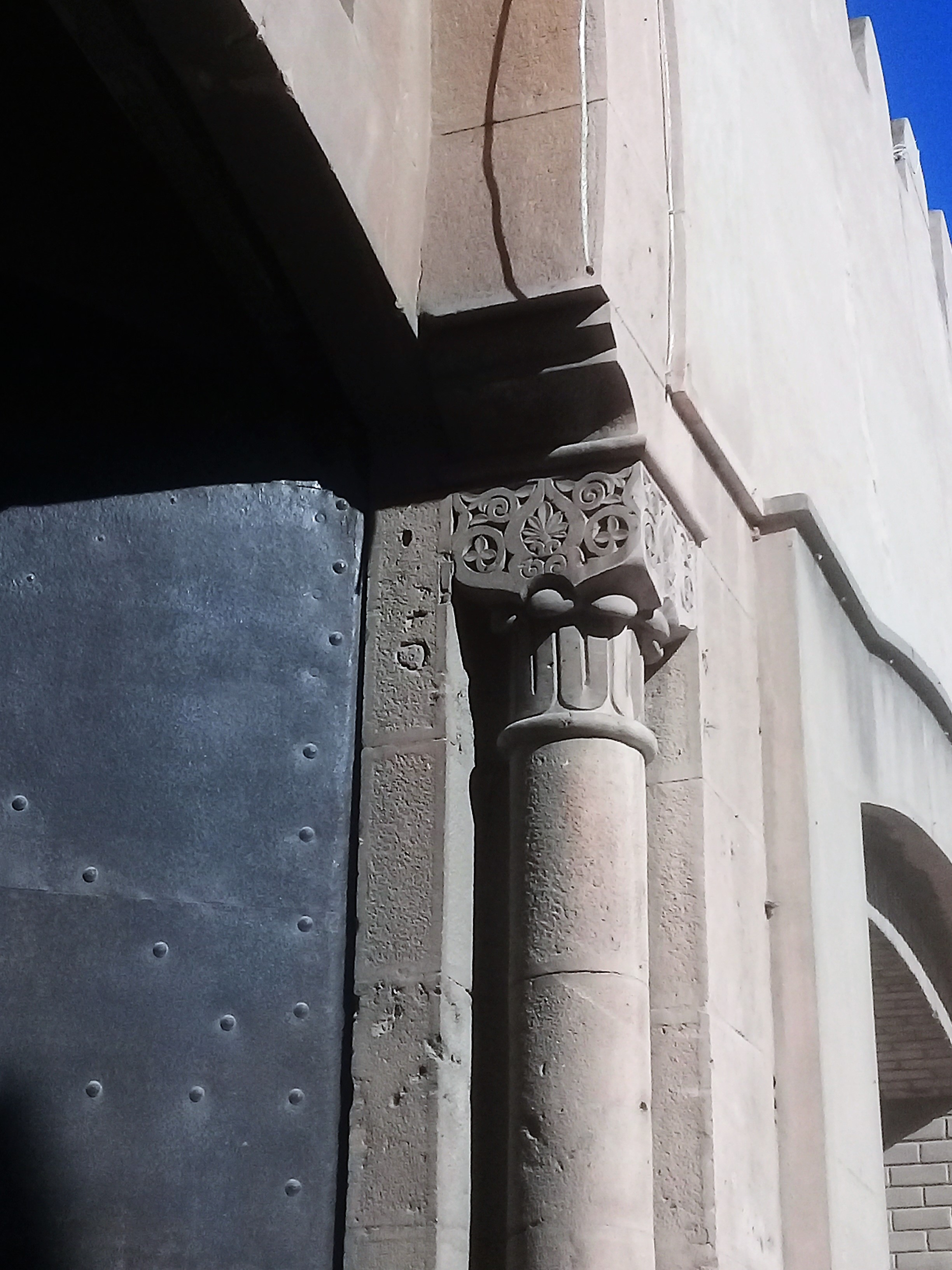
Columns of Bab El Kasbah

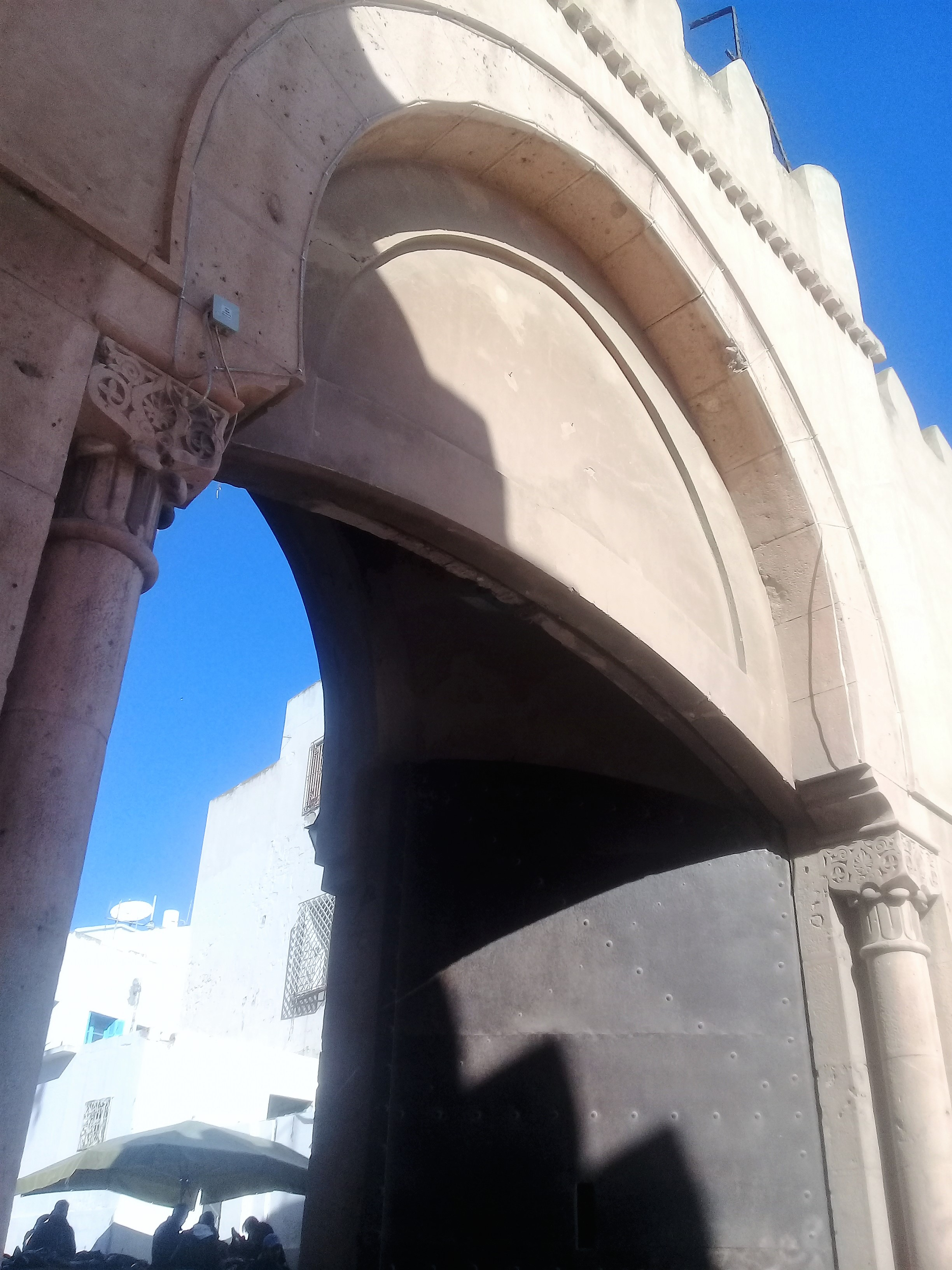
The main entrance of Bab El Kasbah

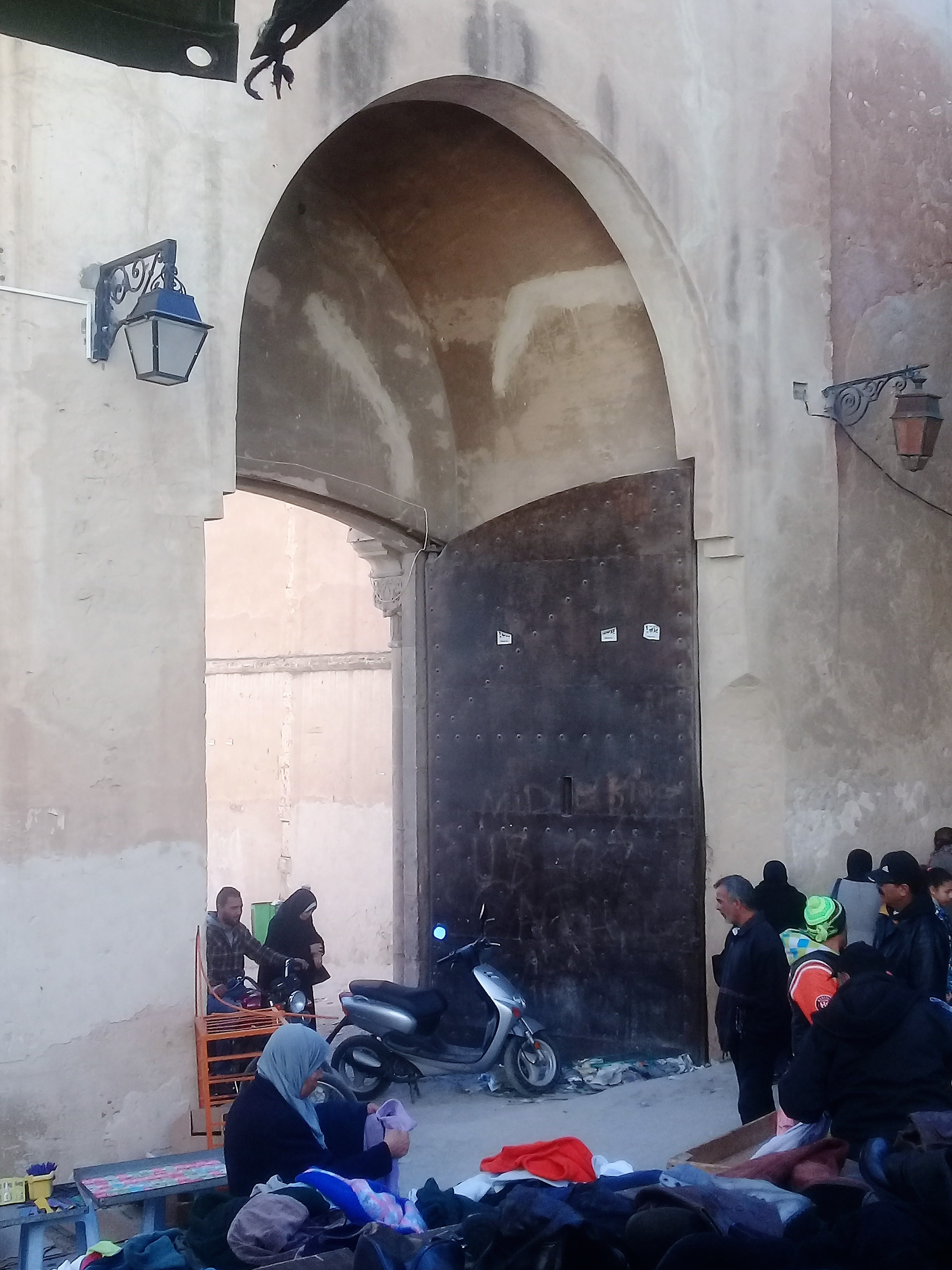
Inner entrance

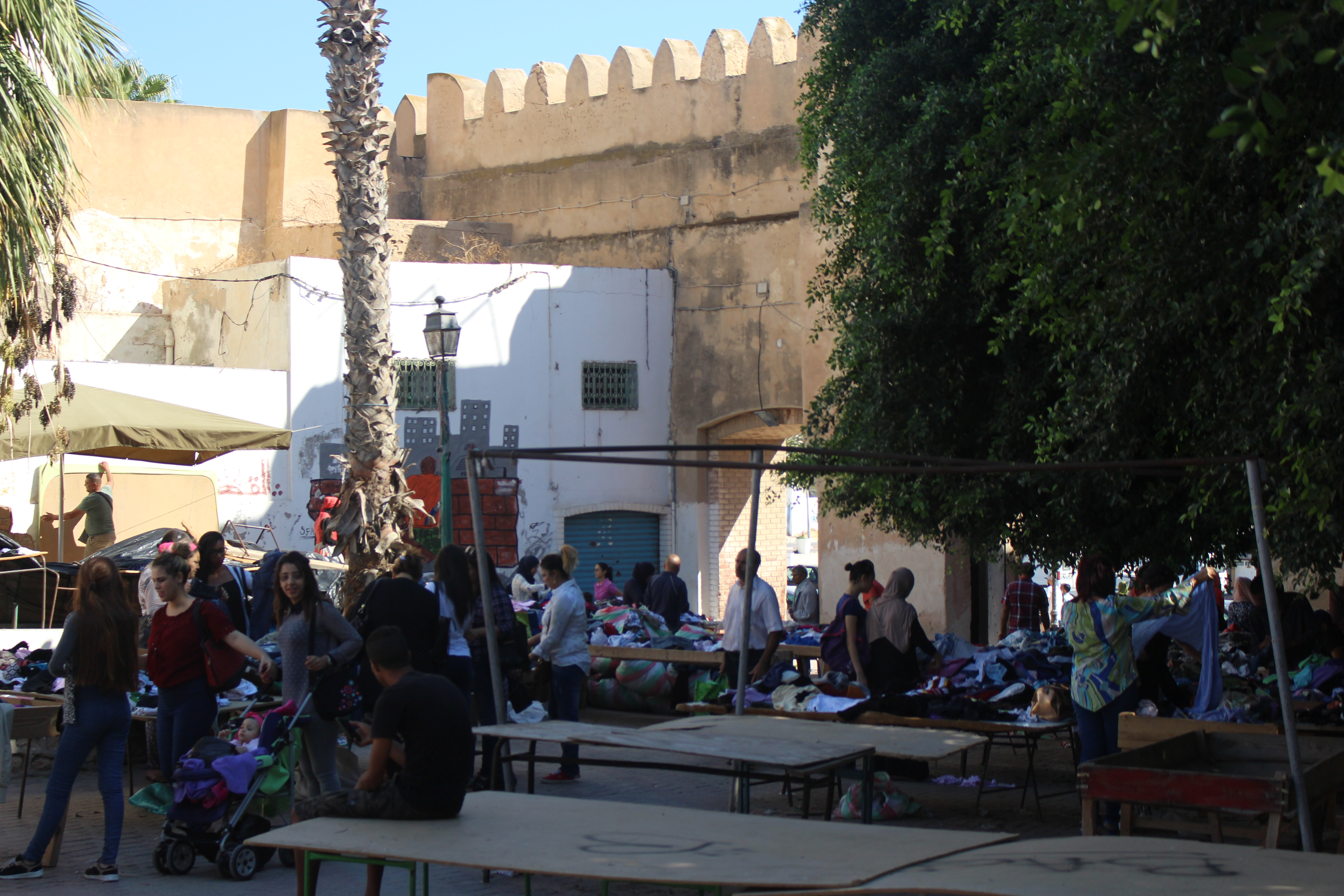
The kasbah square
