= Borj Ennar =

Ancient fortification in Sfax, Tunisia

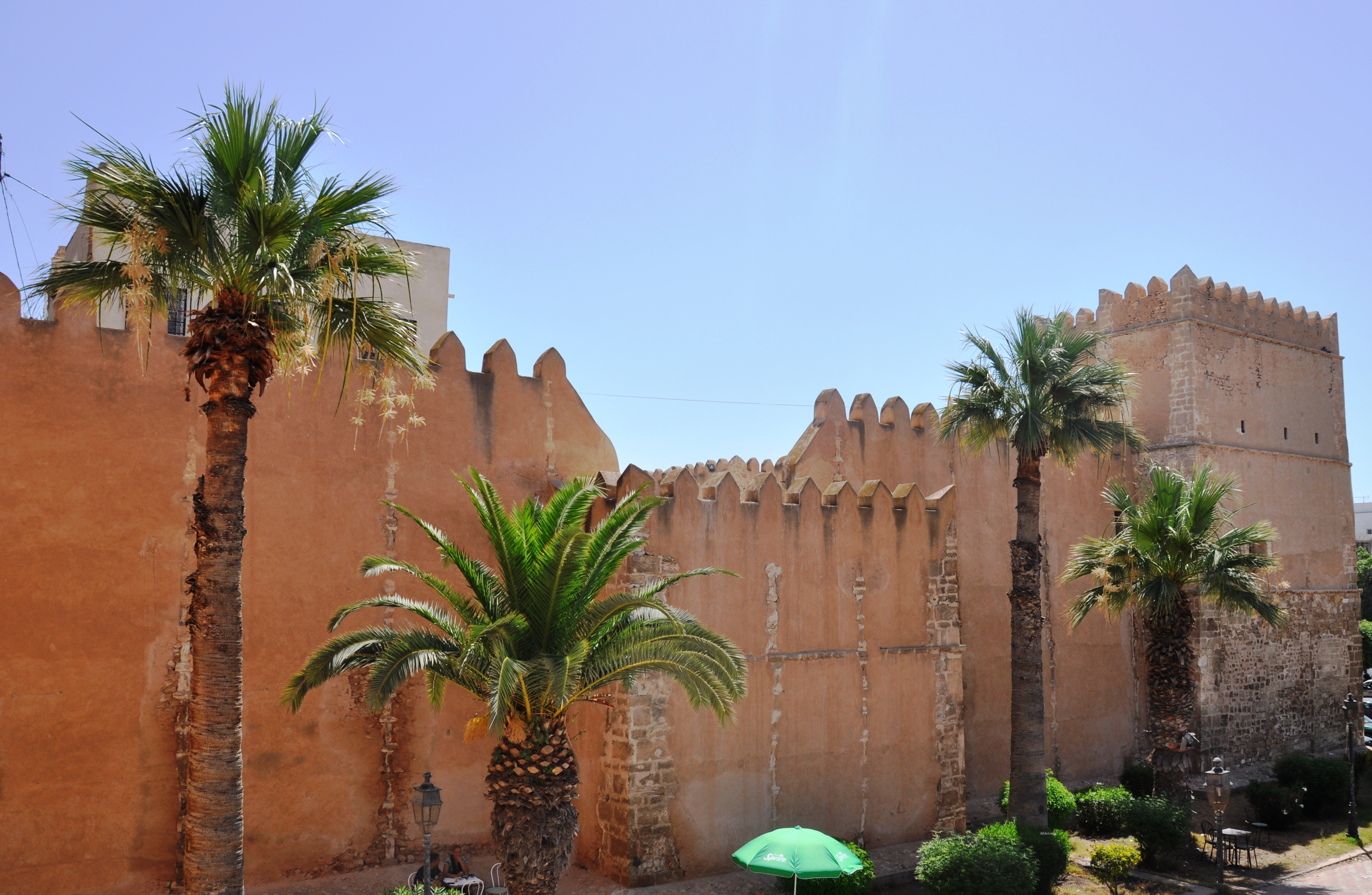
Borj Ennar

Borj Ennar (Arabic:برج النار) is one of the fortifications of the medina of Sfax.

== Localisation ==
The fort is located in the southeast corner of the medina, close to Bab Diwan and Bab Borj Ennar. It is in continuity with the walls and allows a full supervision to all the coastal facade of the medina as well as part of its eastern one.

== History ==
According to historians, Borj Ennar was built at the same time as the foundation of the medina. Originally? Its main role was to monitor the interior of the medina and its surrounding lands, and to notify the rest of the forts that were guarding the maritime border of the country using firecrackers. It is to this role that the monument owes its current name, Borj Ennar meaning "Fort of fire" in Arabic.

During the 18th century, a second fort was attached to the south facade of Borj Ennar. It is Borj Errbat, which got destroyed during the bombings of the Second World War.

Currently, Borj Ennar serves as the headquarters of the Association of Safeguard of the Medina of Sfax. Several other associations also organize their events in its main courtyard.

== Architecture ==
Borj Ennar occupies a total area of 600 m2. It is surrounded by four towers, the two to the south are higher (fifteen meters). Its initial architecture was damaged by bombings of the war.

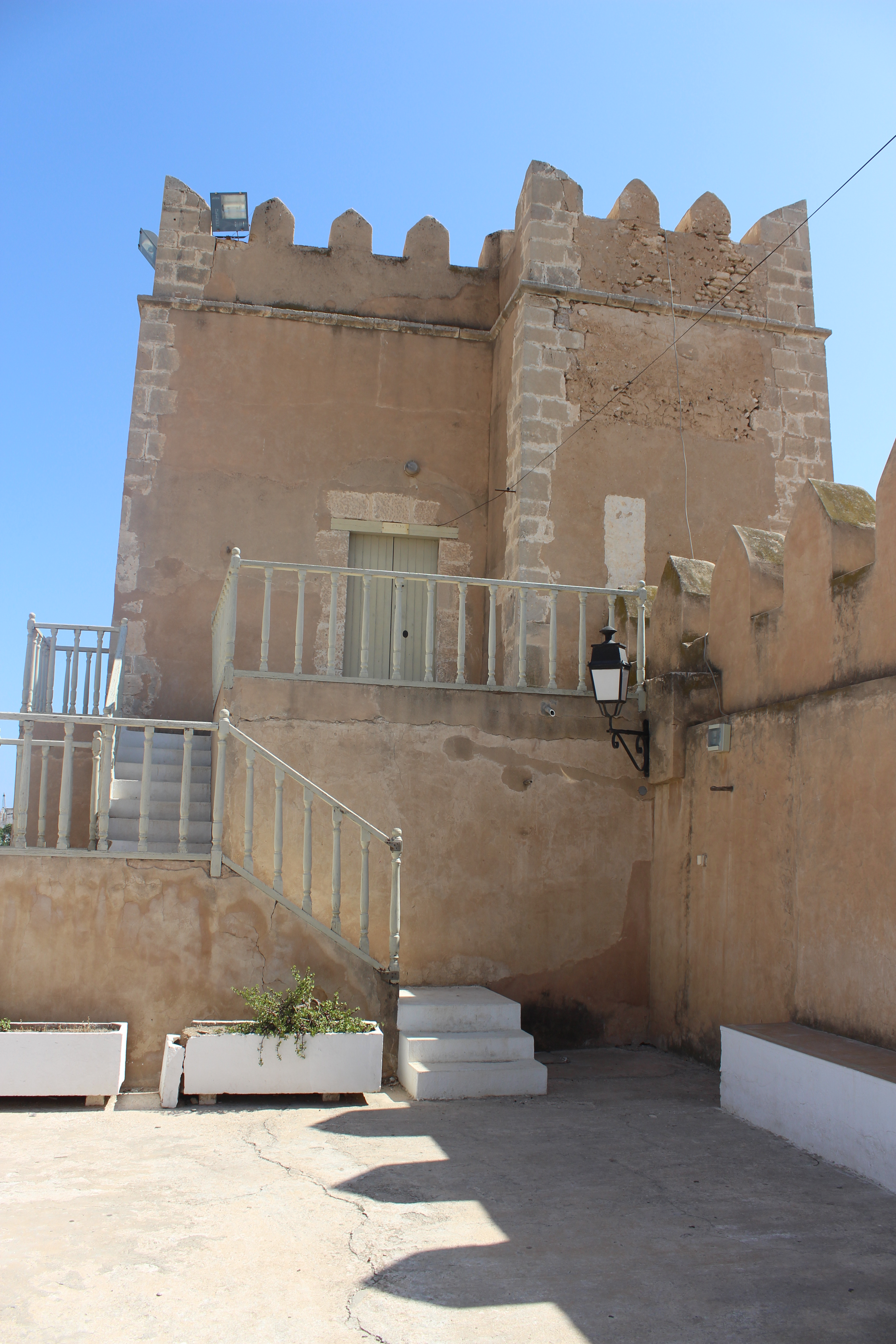

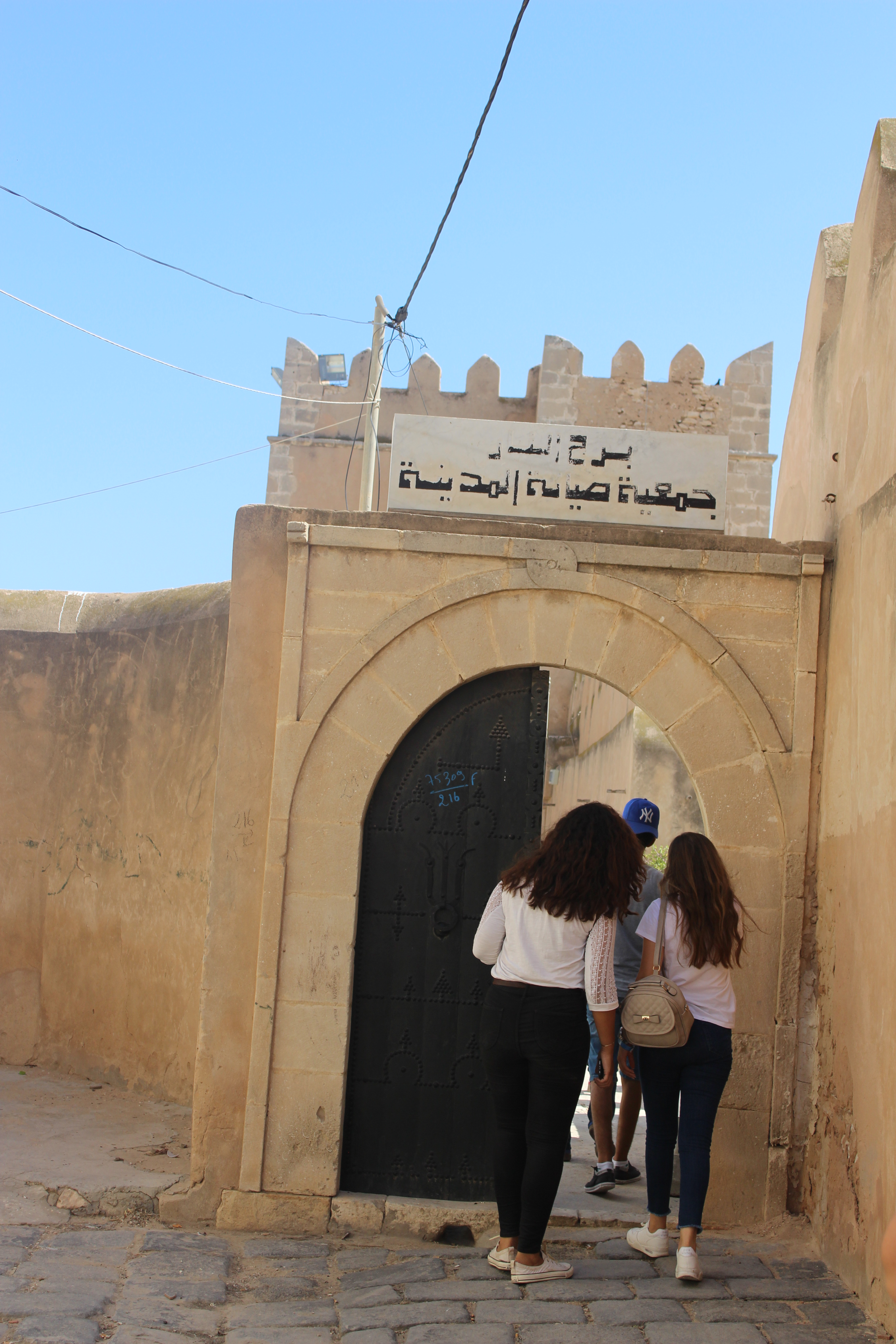

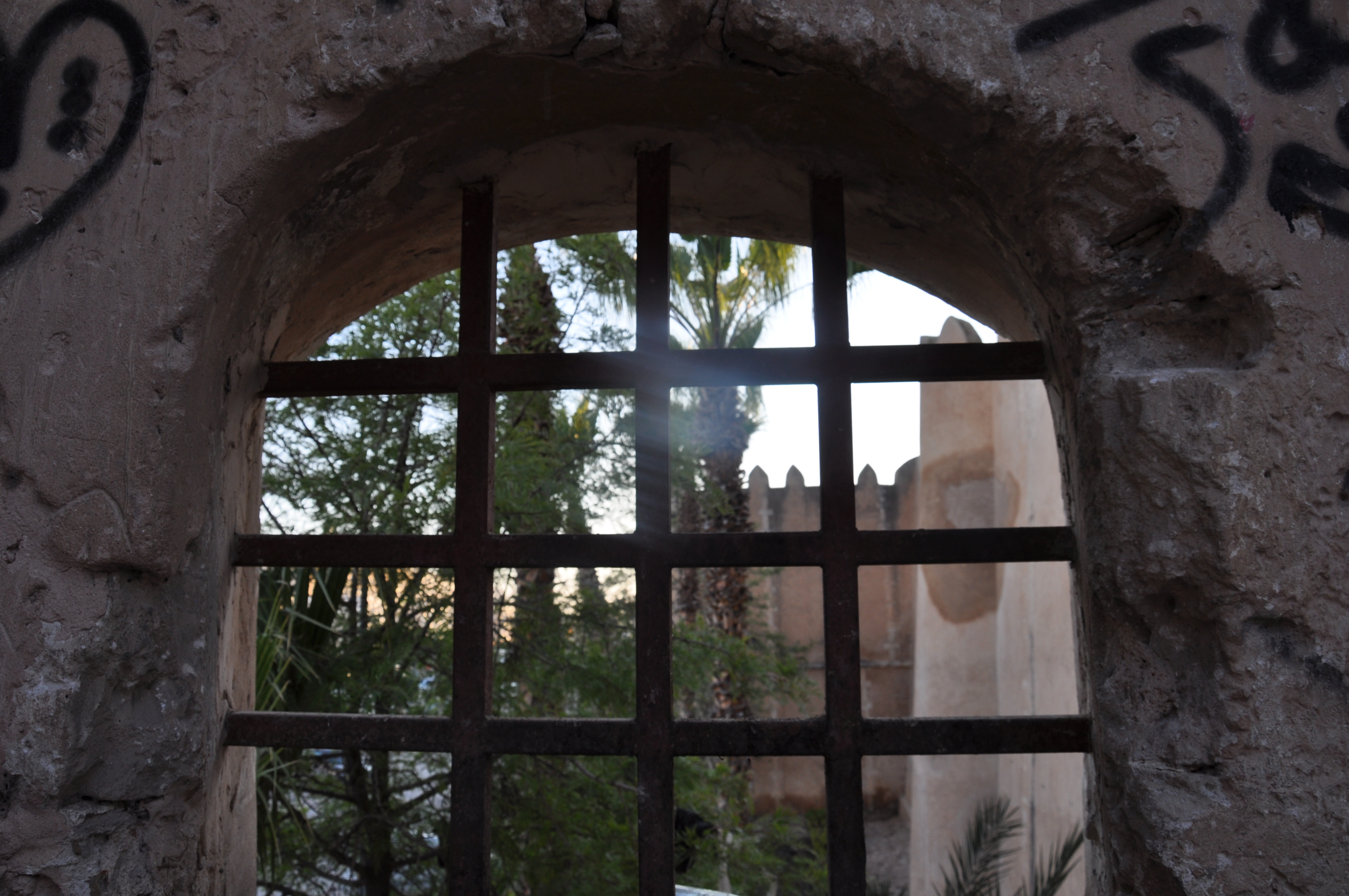

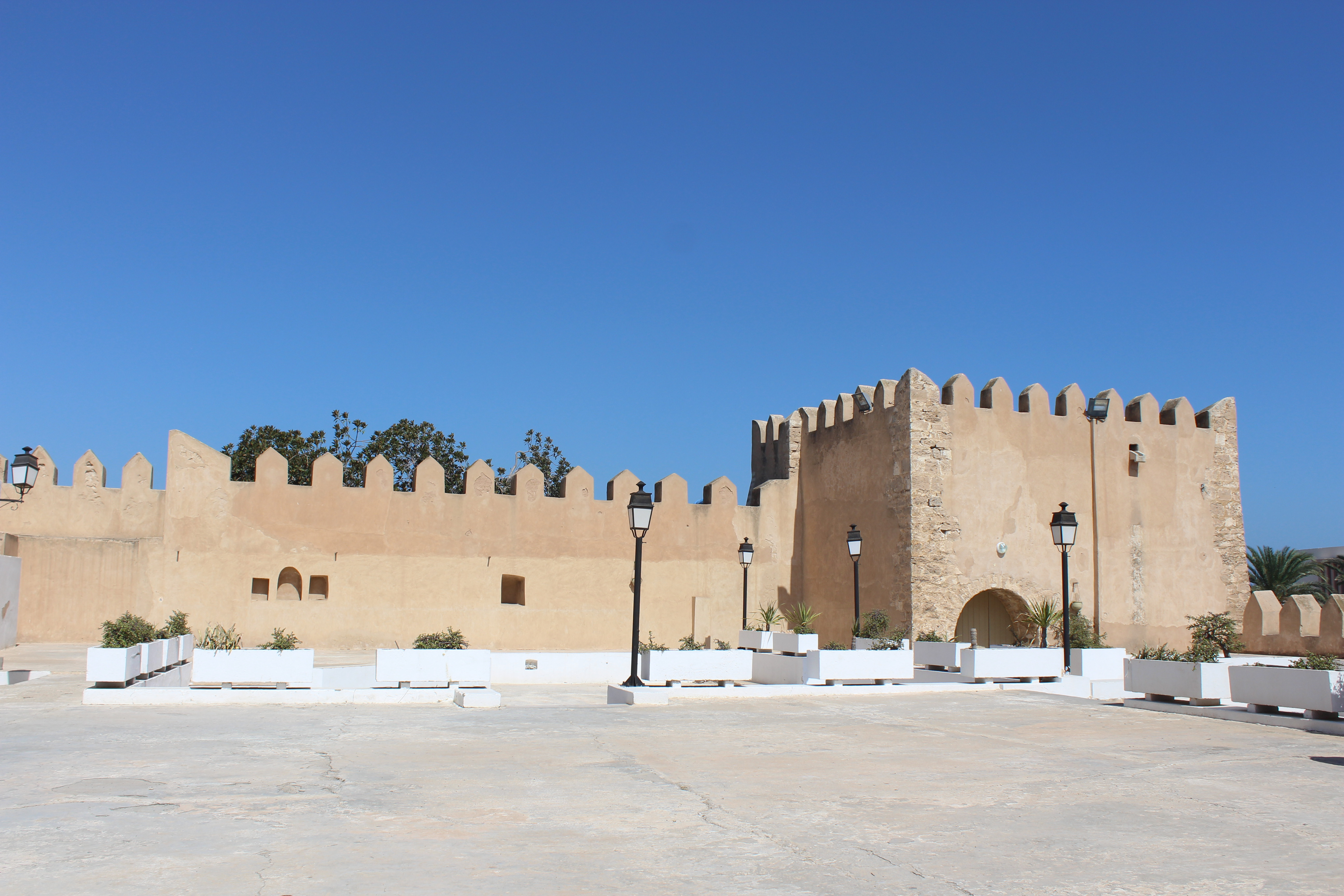
