= Bab Borj Ennar =

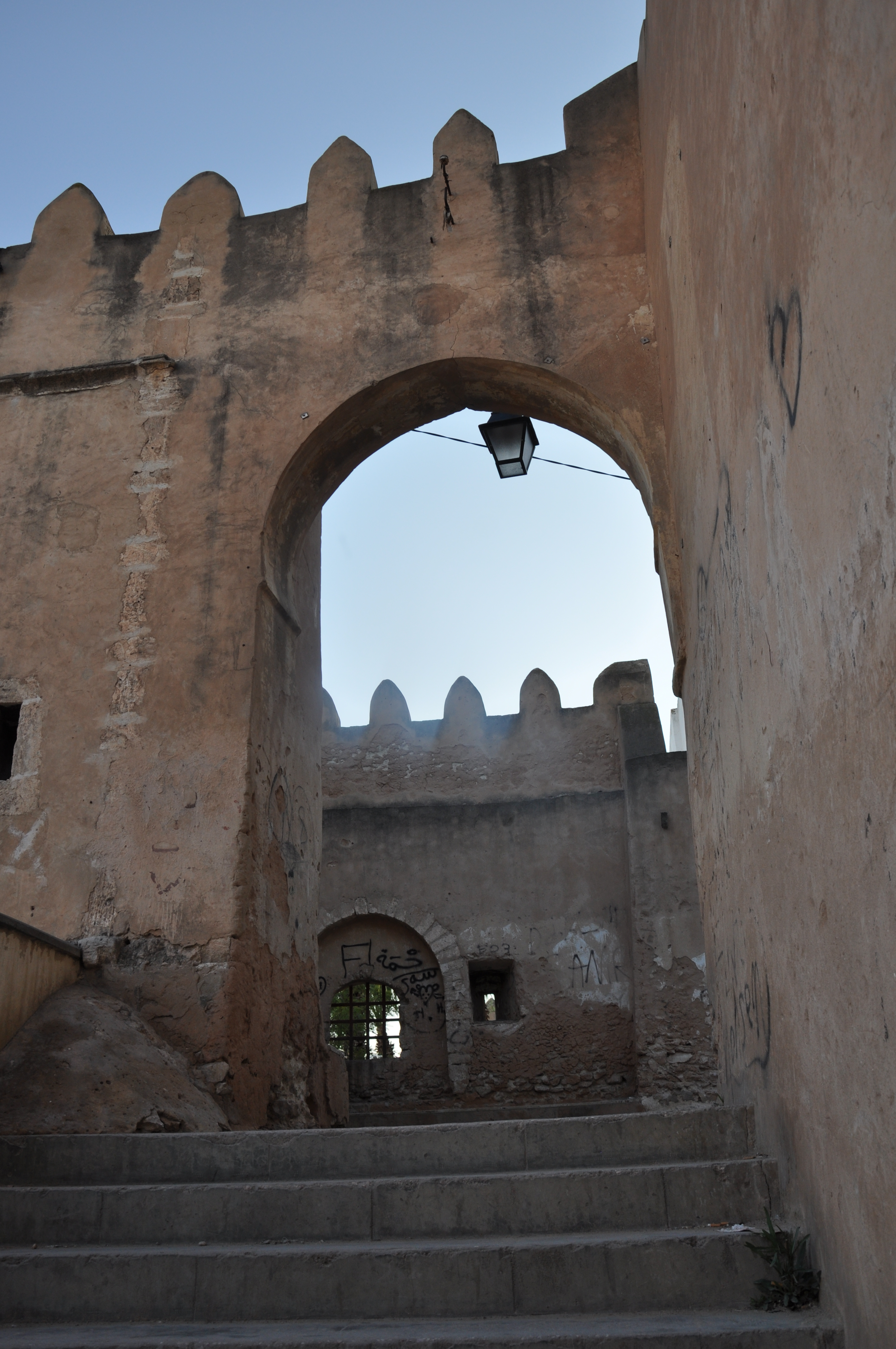
Bab Borj Ennar

Bab Borj Ennar (Arabic: باب برج النار) is one of the gates of the Medina of Sfax, located in the east of the southern facade of the medina's fence. It gives access to Borj Ennar, a fortified defensive device located in the south-eastern angle of the city.

This door was built in the beginning of the 20th century among other gates, in order to decrease the flood of passengers through Bab Bhar and improve the communication between the old city and the colonial quarter of Bab Bhar.

Because of its geographical localization, Bab Borj Ennar links the medina to the modern city with a staircase that gives the passengers access to a parking lot near Ali Belhouane Avenue.

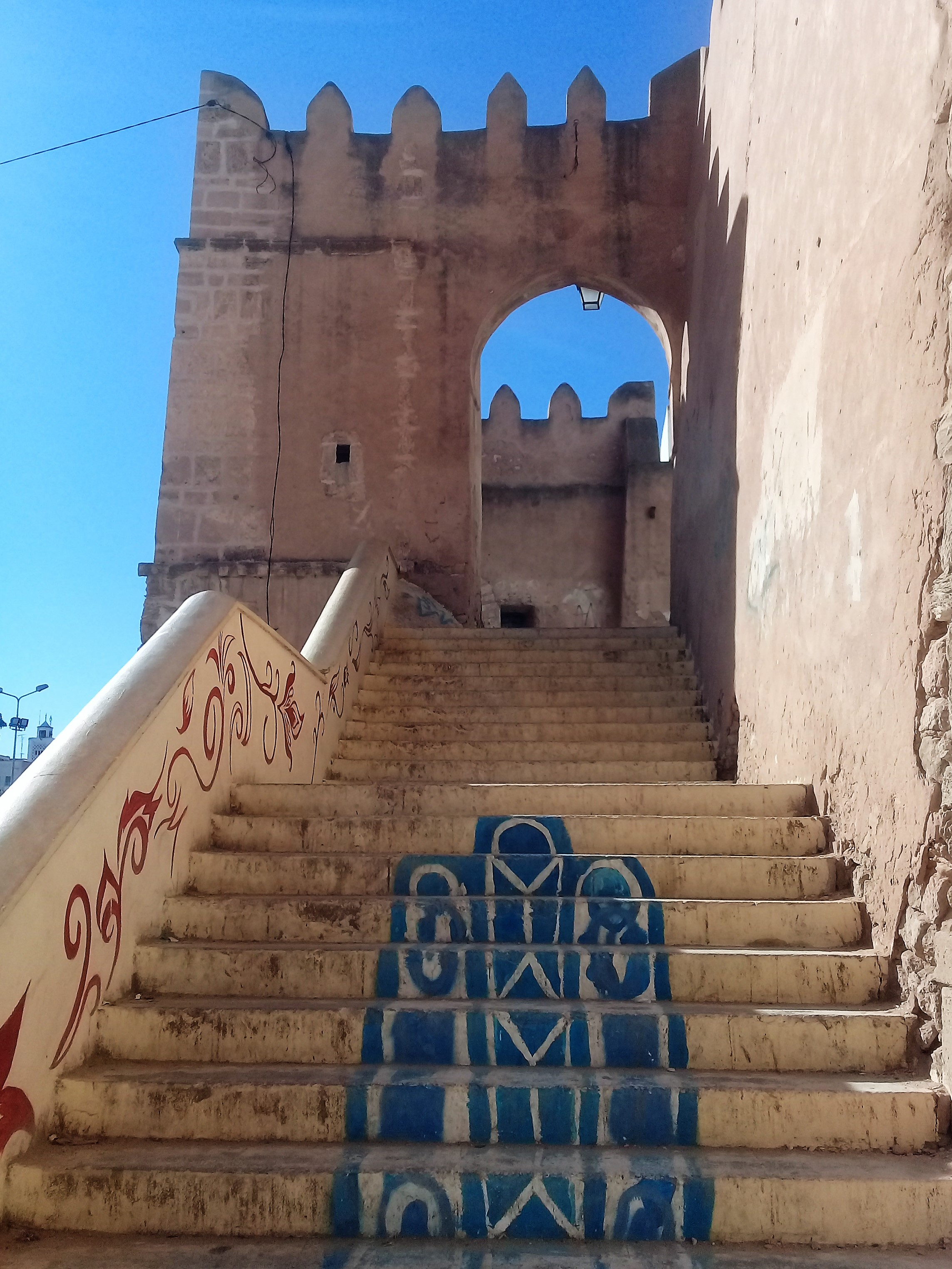

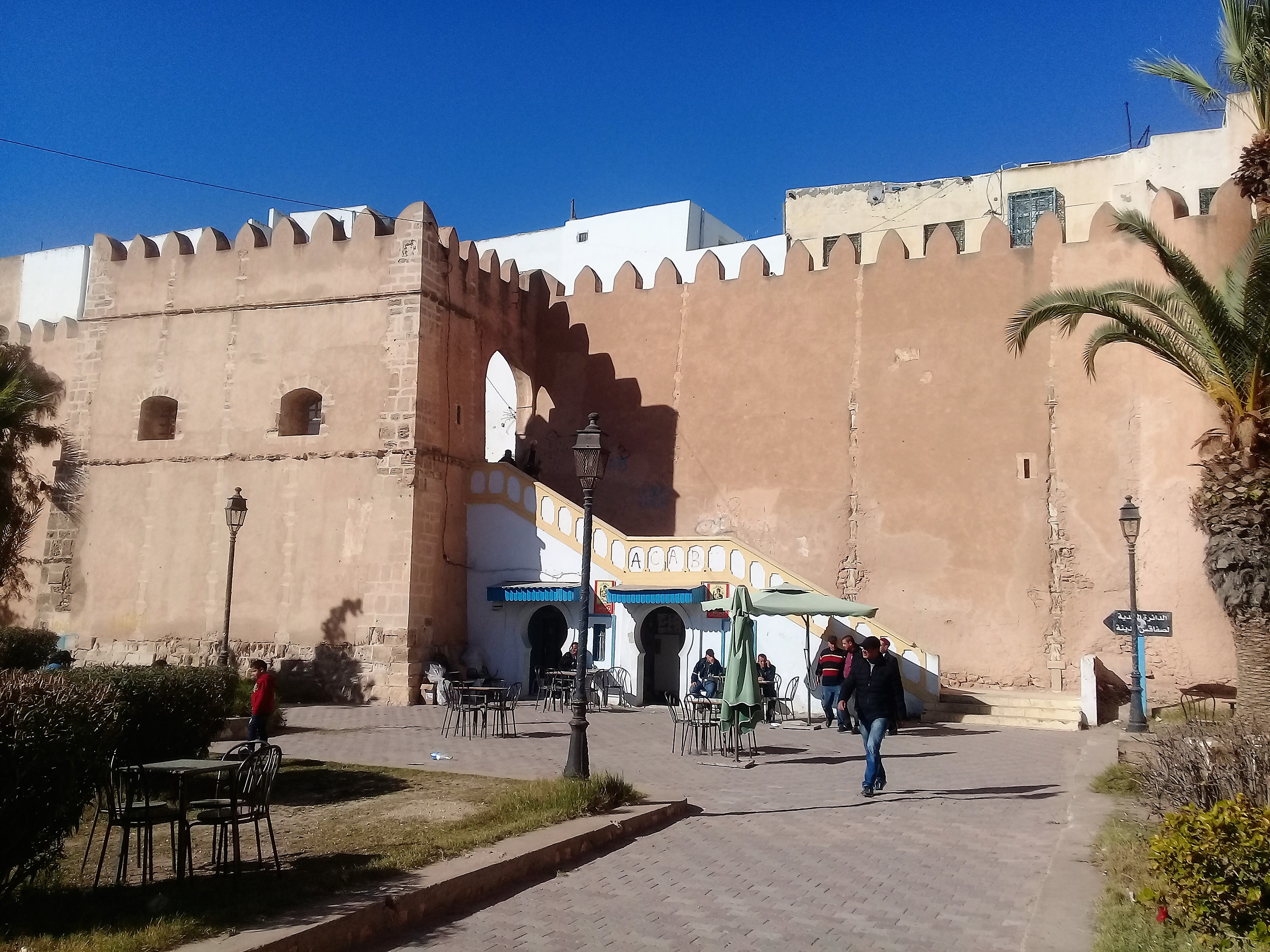

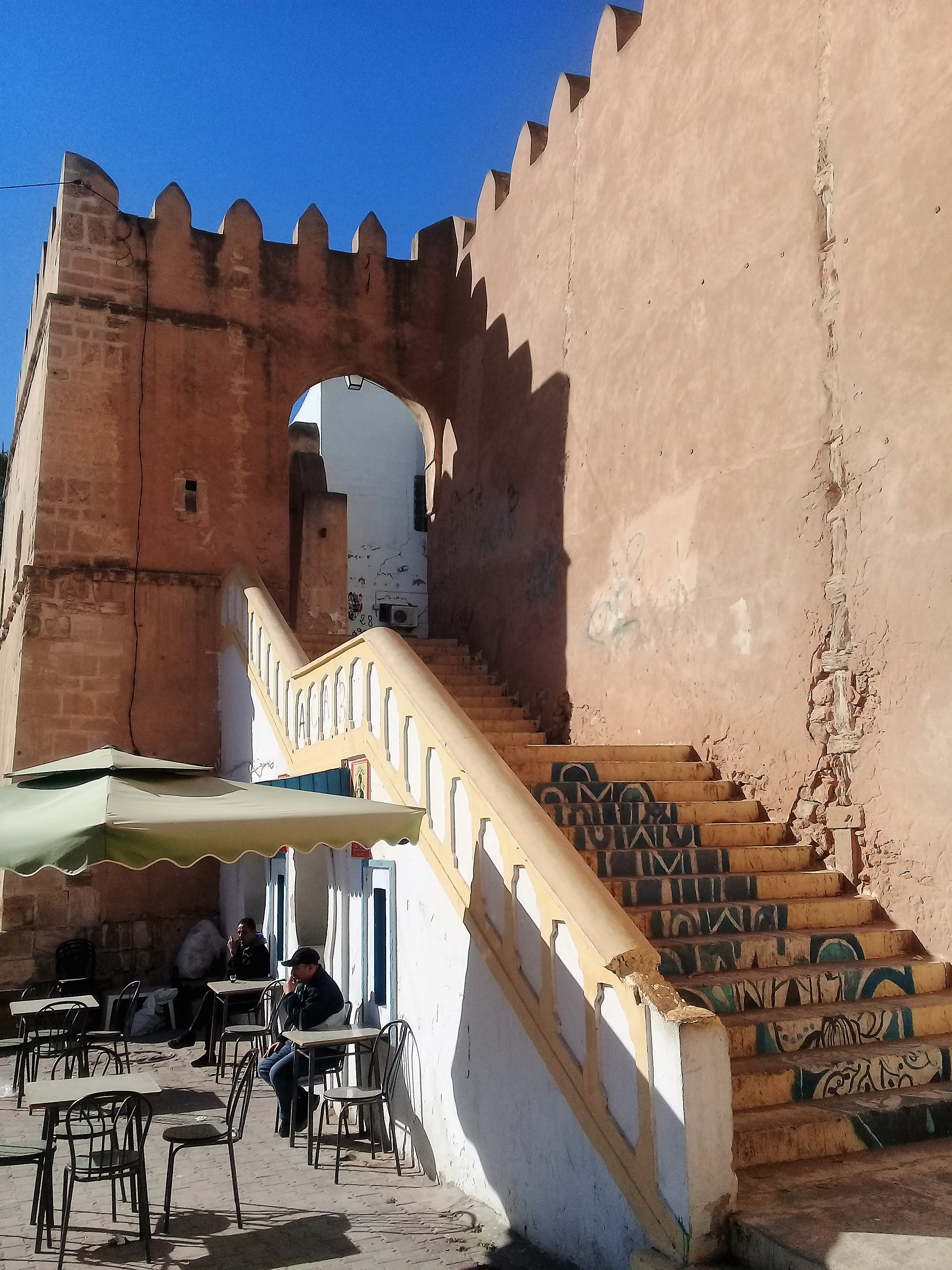

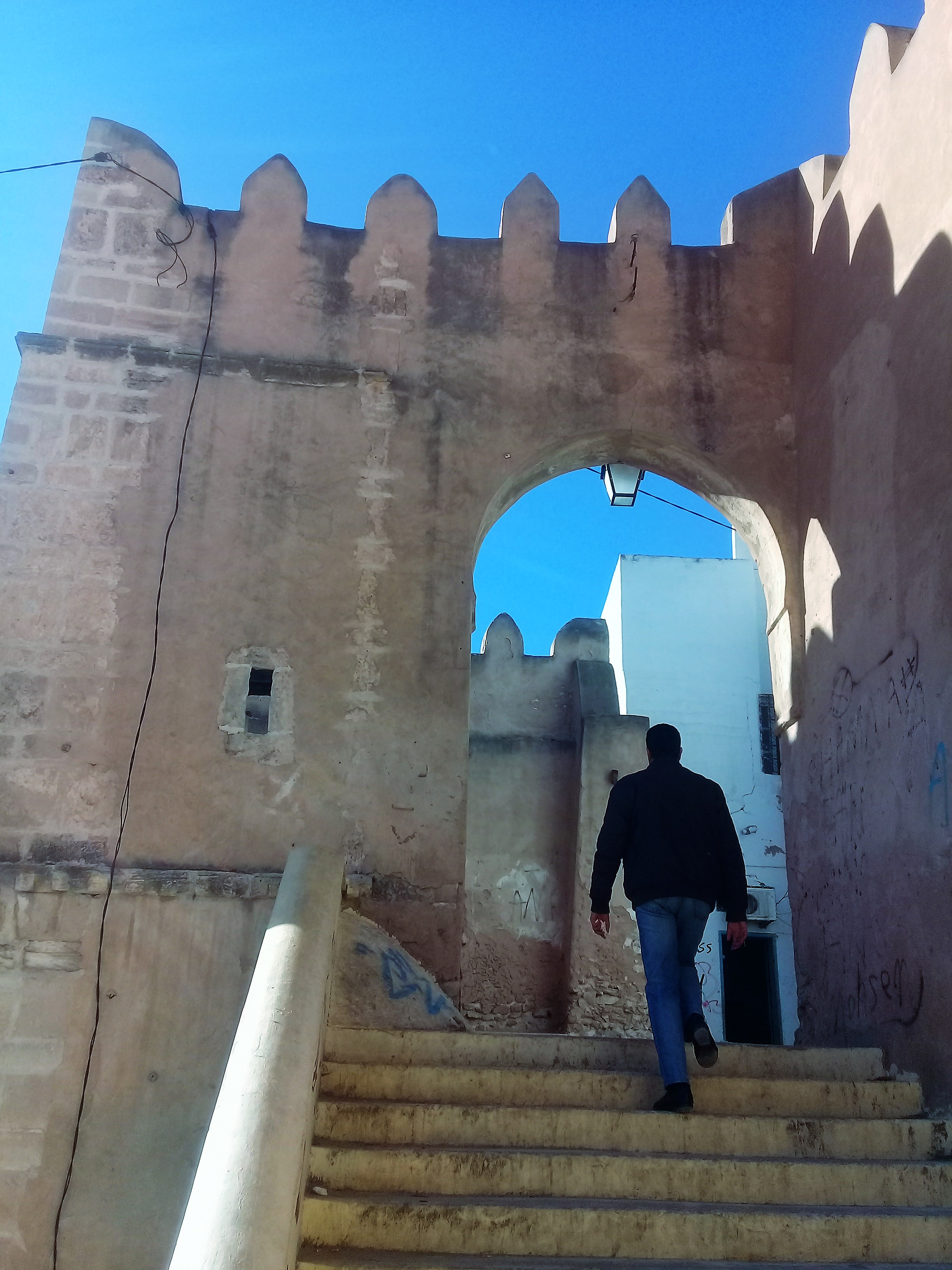
