= Bab Diwan =

City gate of the medina of Sfax, Tunisia

Coordinates: 34.734766°N 10.762225°E

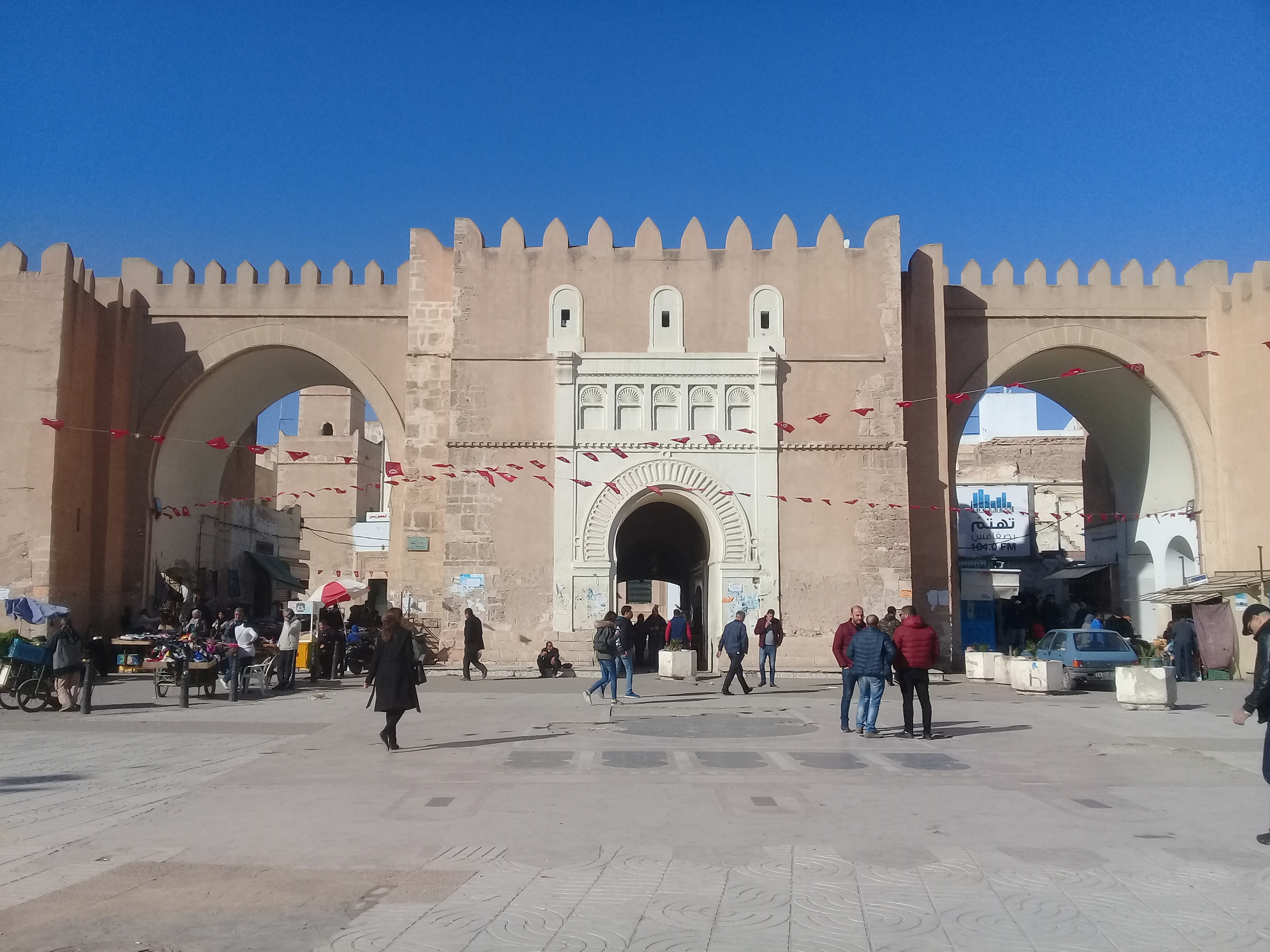
Bab Diwan

Bab Diwan (Arabic: باب الديوان) or Bab Bhar (Door of the sea) (Arabic: باب بحر) is one of the gates of the medina of Sfax. It is located in the southern facade of the old city between Bab Kasbah on the western corner and Bab Borj Ennar on the east.

== Etymology ==
Bab Diwan got its name during the Hafsid era from the Arabic word Diwan that refers to the customs administration, as Sfax had intense economical and commercial relations with other cities.

Also, it is frequently called Bab Bhar as it opens on the sea.

== History ==
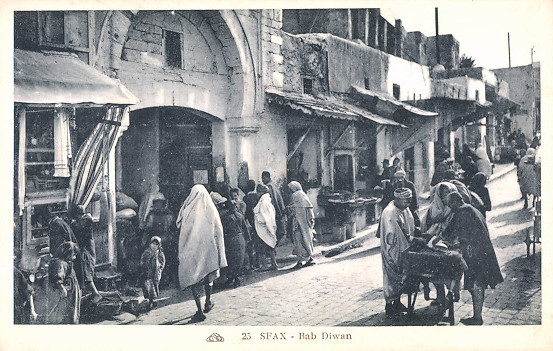
A postcard showing Bab Diwan in the 20th century

In the beginning, Bab Bhar was a normal gate for passengers with the same form as Bab Jebli in the northern facade of the Medina. Yet, considering its geographical localization that made it more exposed to attacks, the gate benefited during the 17th century from improvements being made to the defenses of Sfax and got more fortified. The access to the inside of the city through this entrance was difficult, and before the 20th century modifications, every passenger taking it to enter the city had to turn right and walk through a narrow alley inside the wall for about 30 meters before turning left and reaching the inside.

This design was set up for security reasons because even if the outer gate could be battered open, the invaders would have been vulnerable to attack from above as they worked on the inner gate, at which they would have very little room for manoeuvre for their equipment.

== Entrances of Bab Diwan ==
Originally, the gate was the only one in Sfax facing the sea. Later, three other such gates were added over the years in order to adapt to the development of the community inside the city.

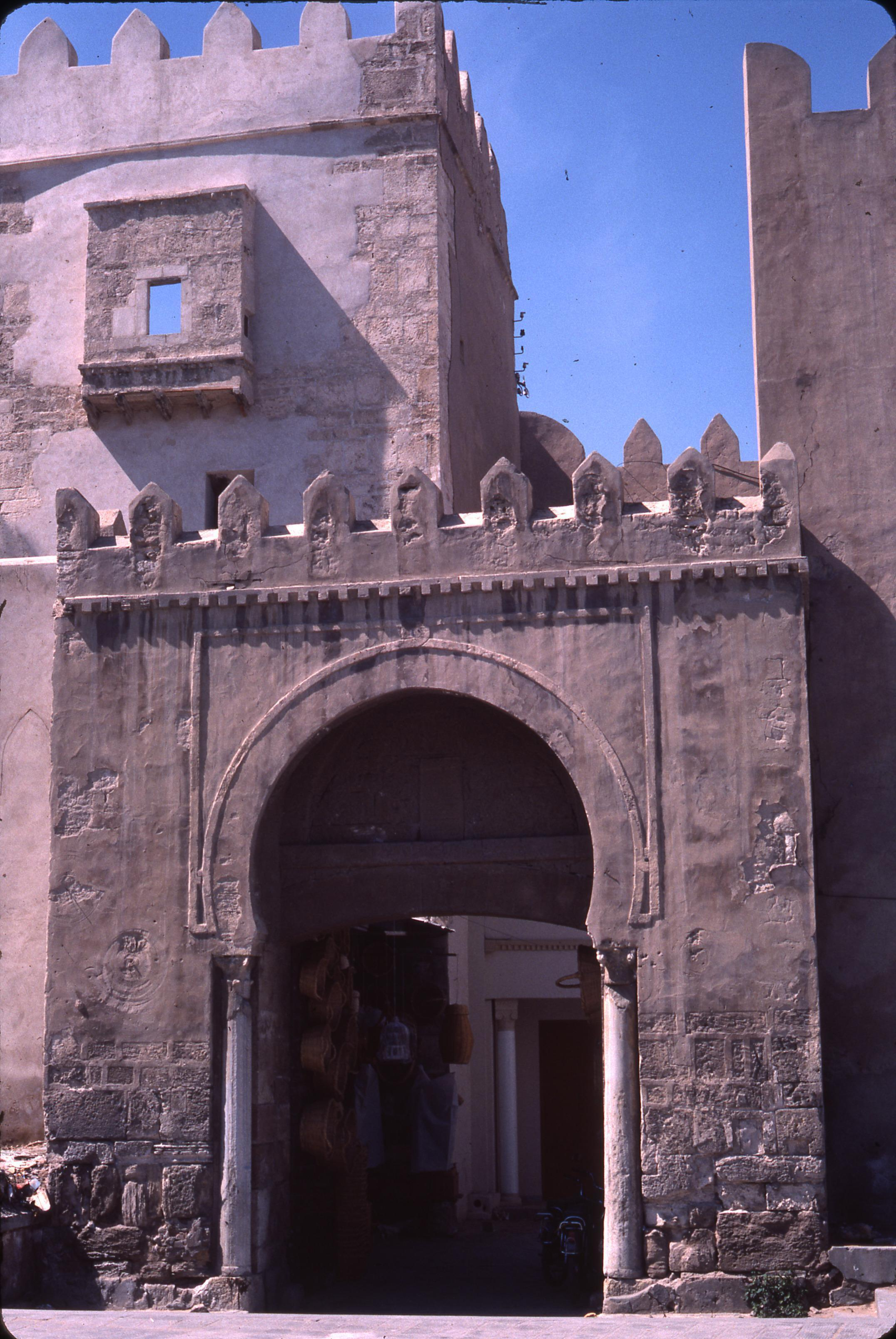
The original gate

=== The original gate ===
The oldest entrance in Bab Bhar is part of a wall section that projects out from the main line of the wall.

It is composed of two doors: an outer one (currently the one located in the west of the facade) and an internal one facing Ajouzine Mosque. To reach the inside of the city, passengers have to go through the external door and two sheds: one in the east and the second in the south. These sheds that were originally payment points for the customs, are currently occupied by merchants.

In April 1885, the municipality built added a minaret with a clock, but it was destroyed later during the bombing raids of the second world war in 1942.

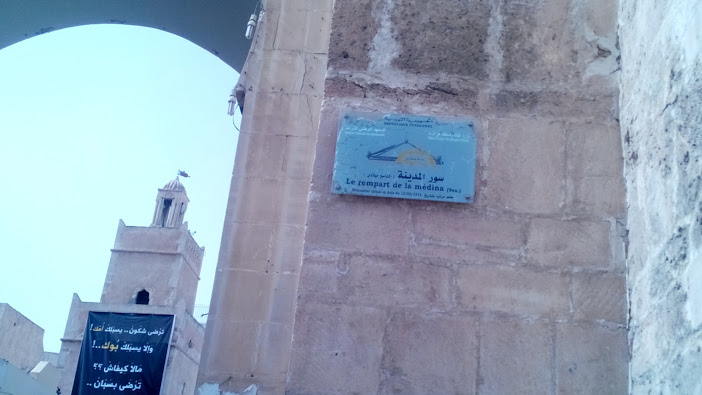
The inner door with Ajouzine Mosque in the back

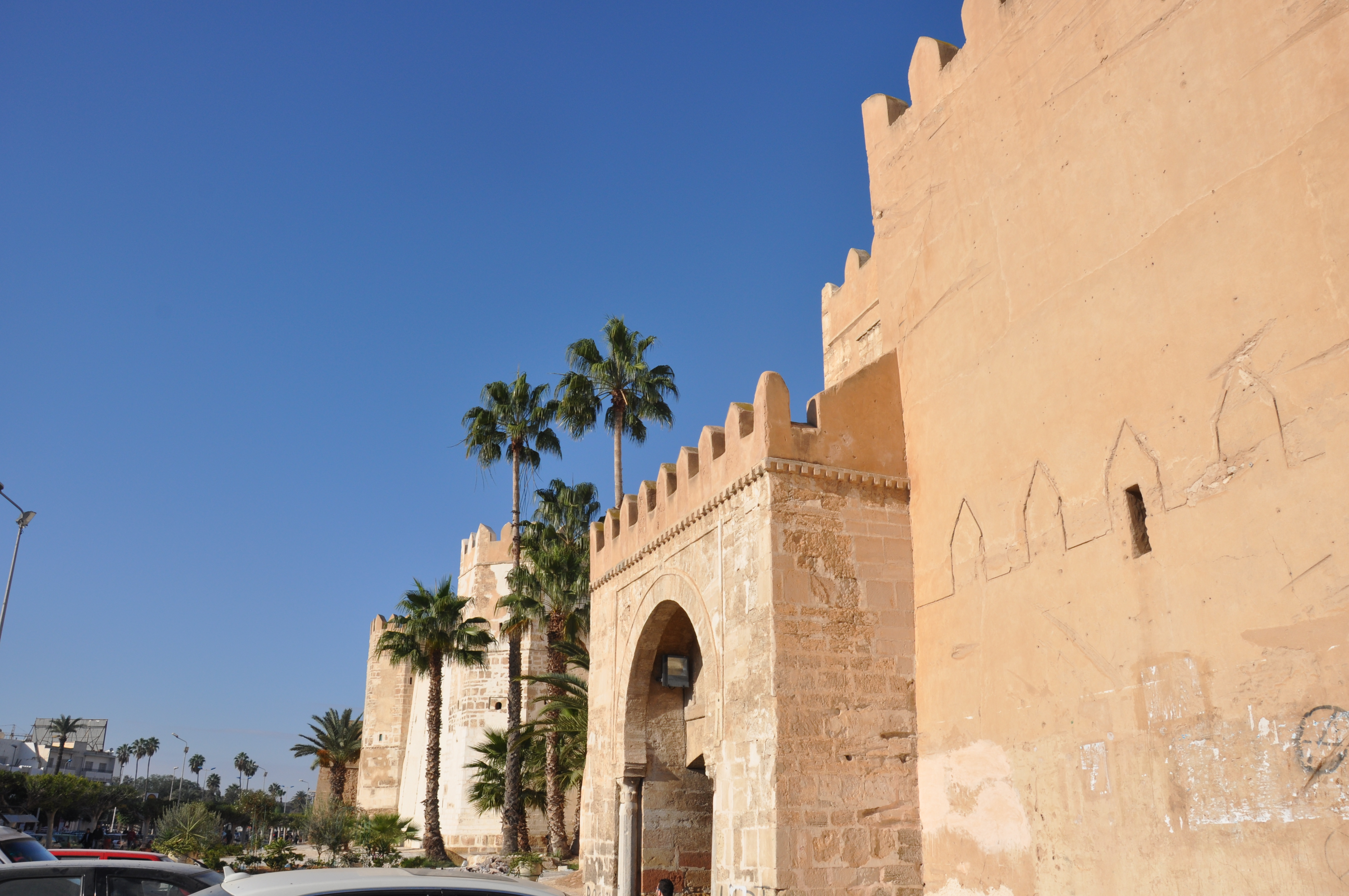
The outer entrance

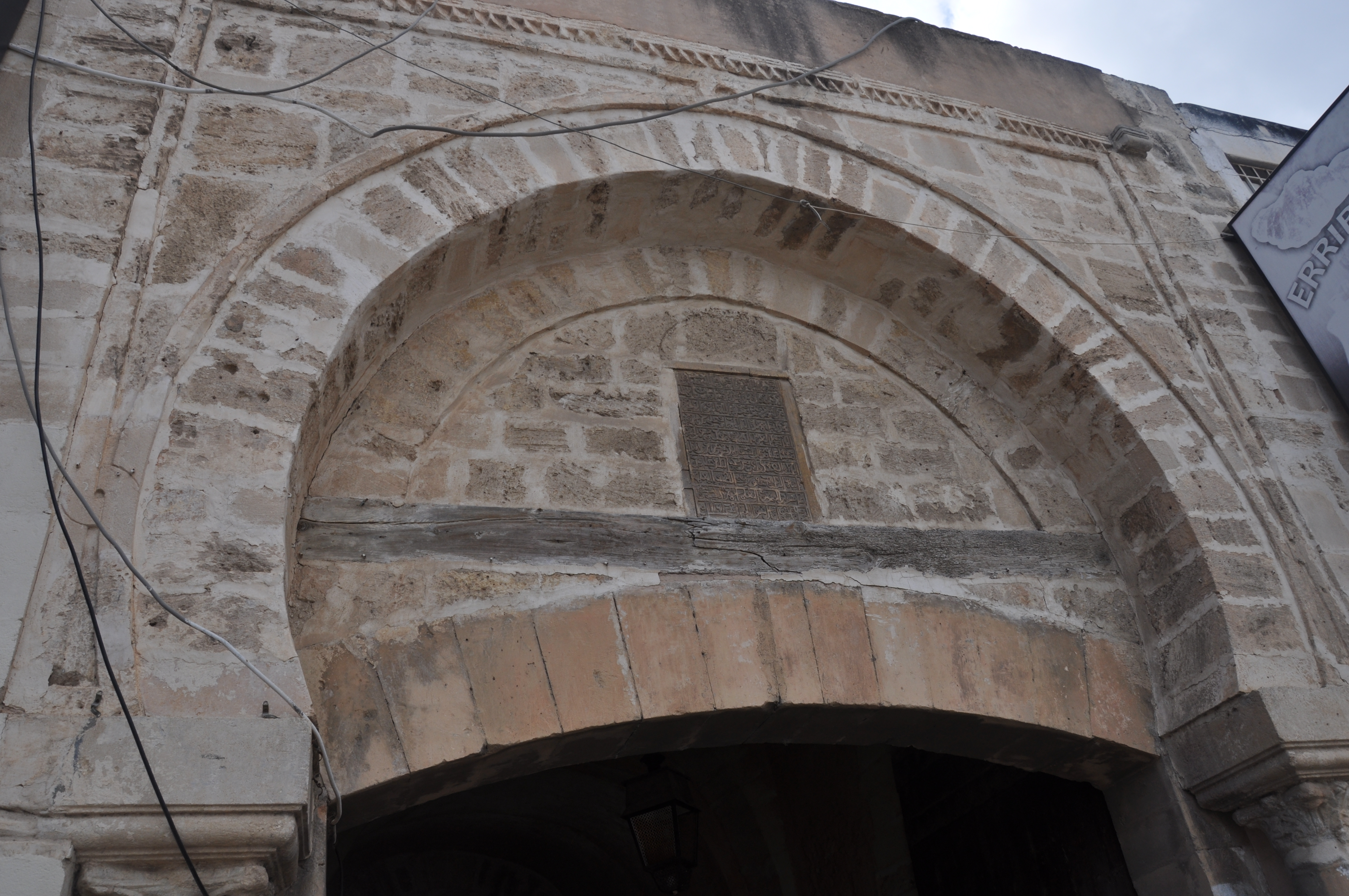
Inscription on top of the door

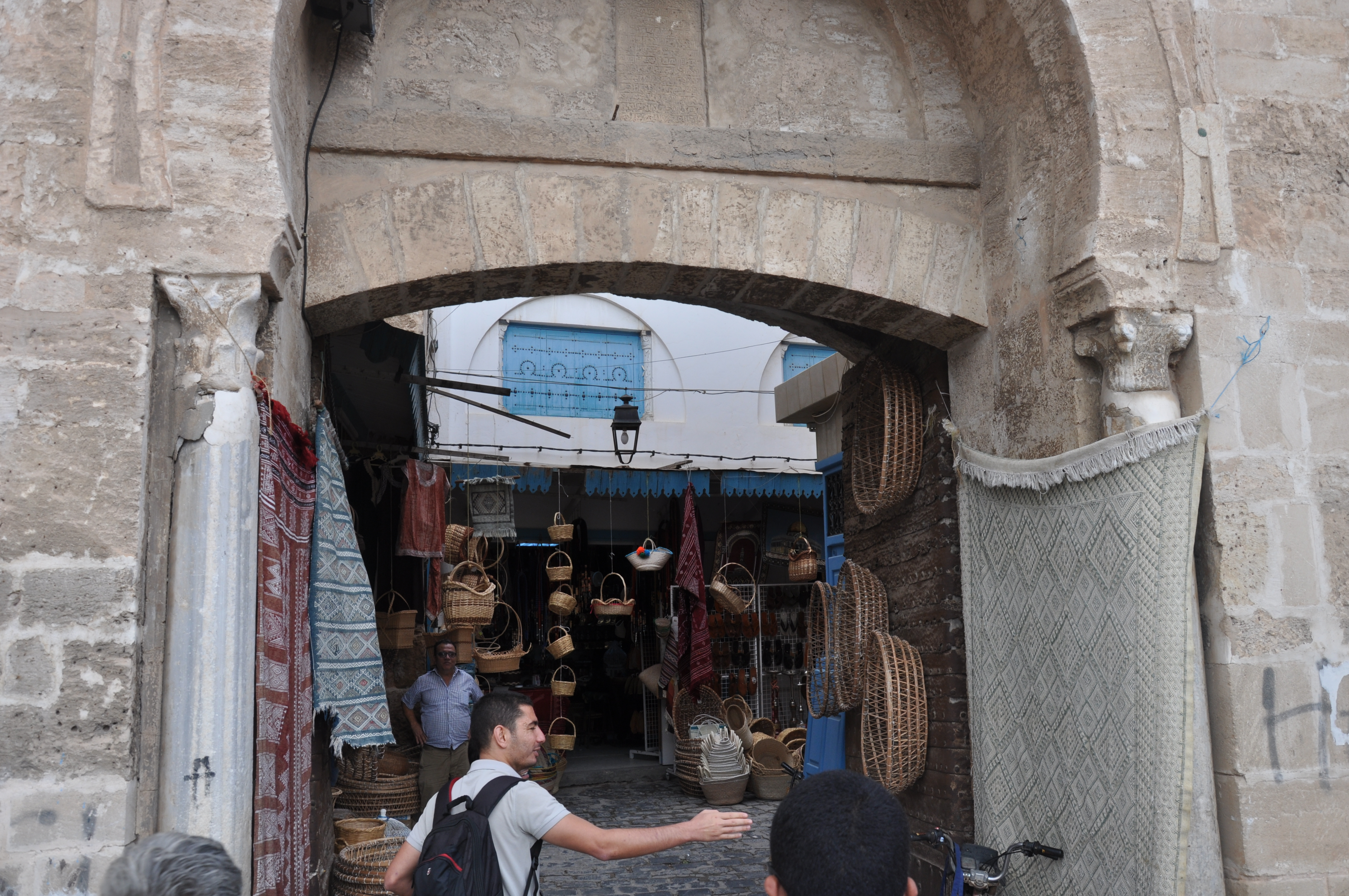
Shops inside the sheds

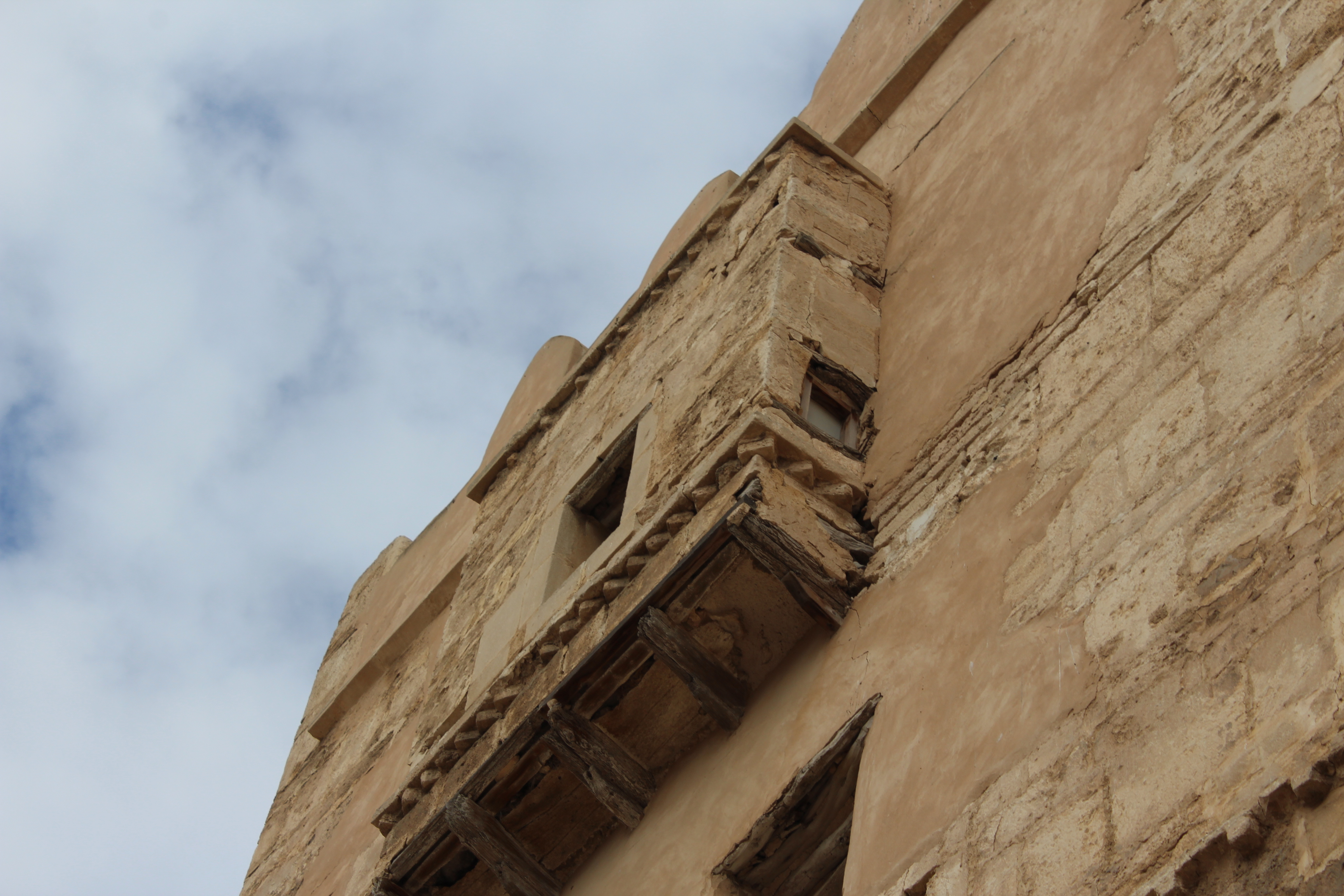
The tower on top of the original gate

=== The France door ===
In 1904, the french minister Delcassé visited the medina and noticed offset alignment and the darkness of the alley linking the outer and inner entrances. So by 1909, a new additional entrance "porte Delcassé" or "porte de France" was added facing the inner entrance of the original gate. This allowed traffic, pedestrians and commercial goods being delivered by barrows and granted easier access to the medina.

This gate represents the central entrance in Bab Diwan between the two big entrances added after the independence.

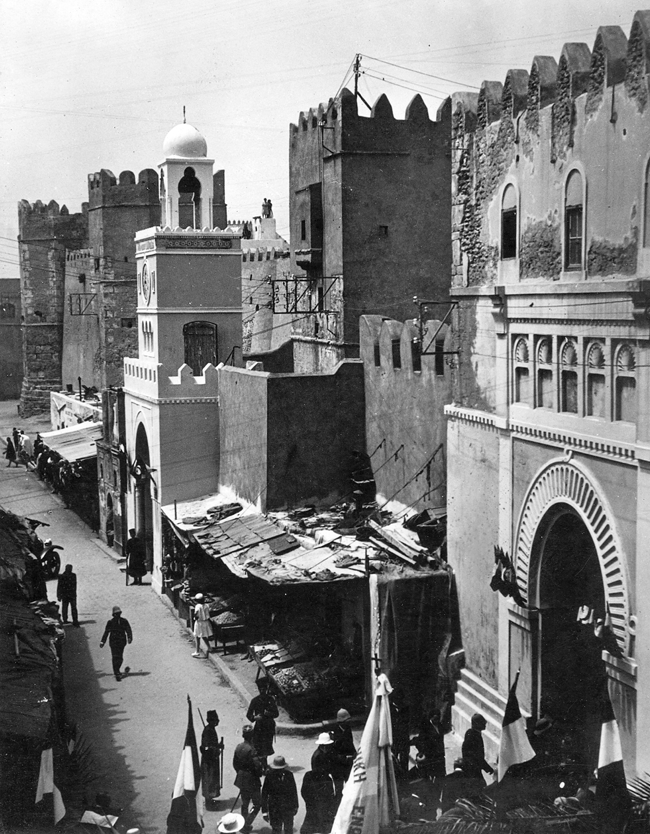
Bab Diwan with Porte De France in the 20th century

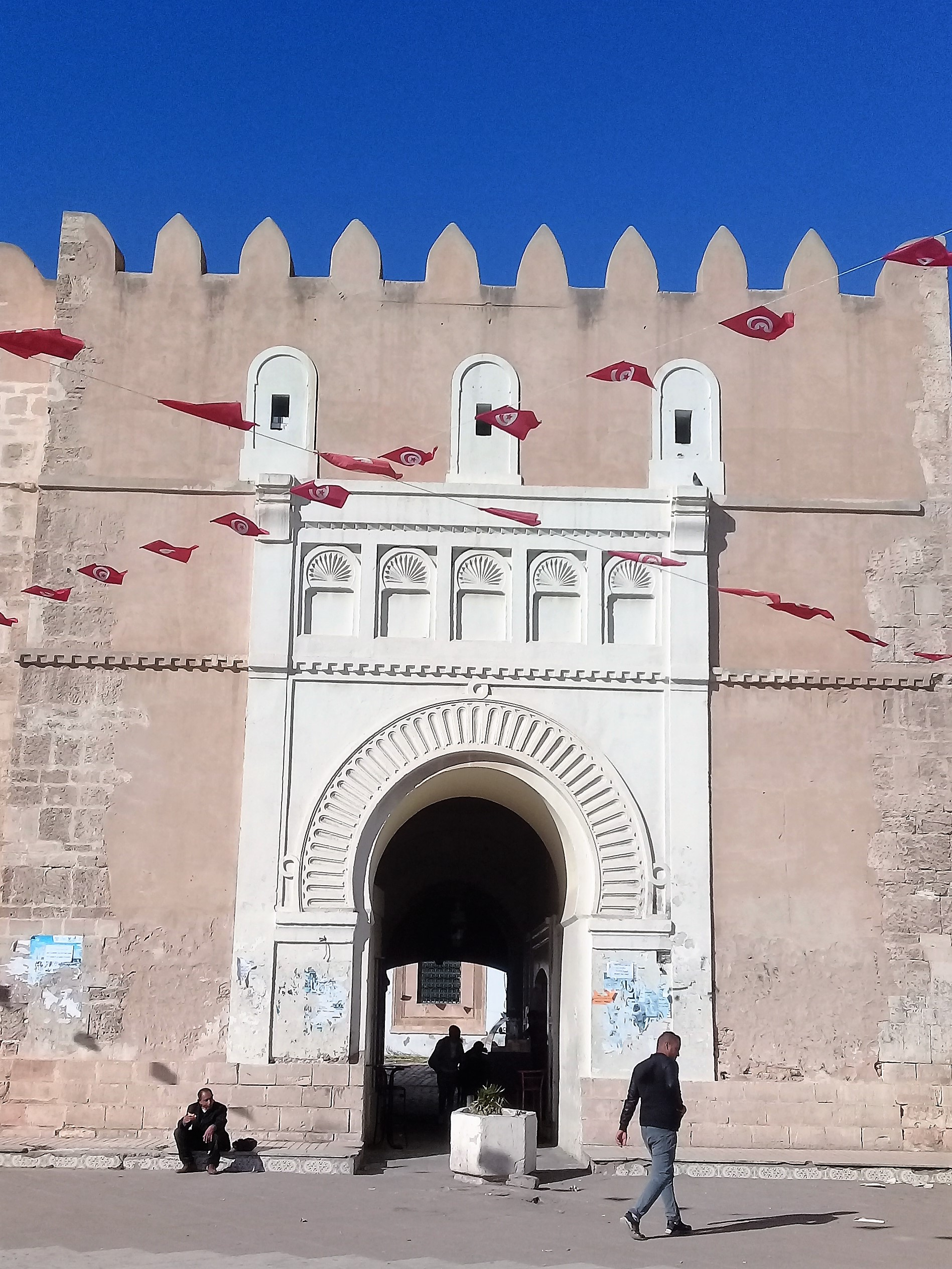
Delcassé Gate

=== The independence gates ===
During the country's independence period, two large entrances were added allowing unprecedented access to the medina for the vehicles in 1963:

- One between the original door and the France door, separating the sheds
- One in the east of Bab Diwan over the ruins of a small door that was discovered later in 1953
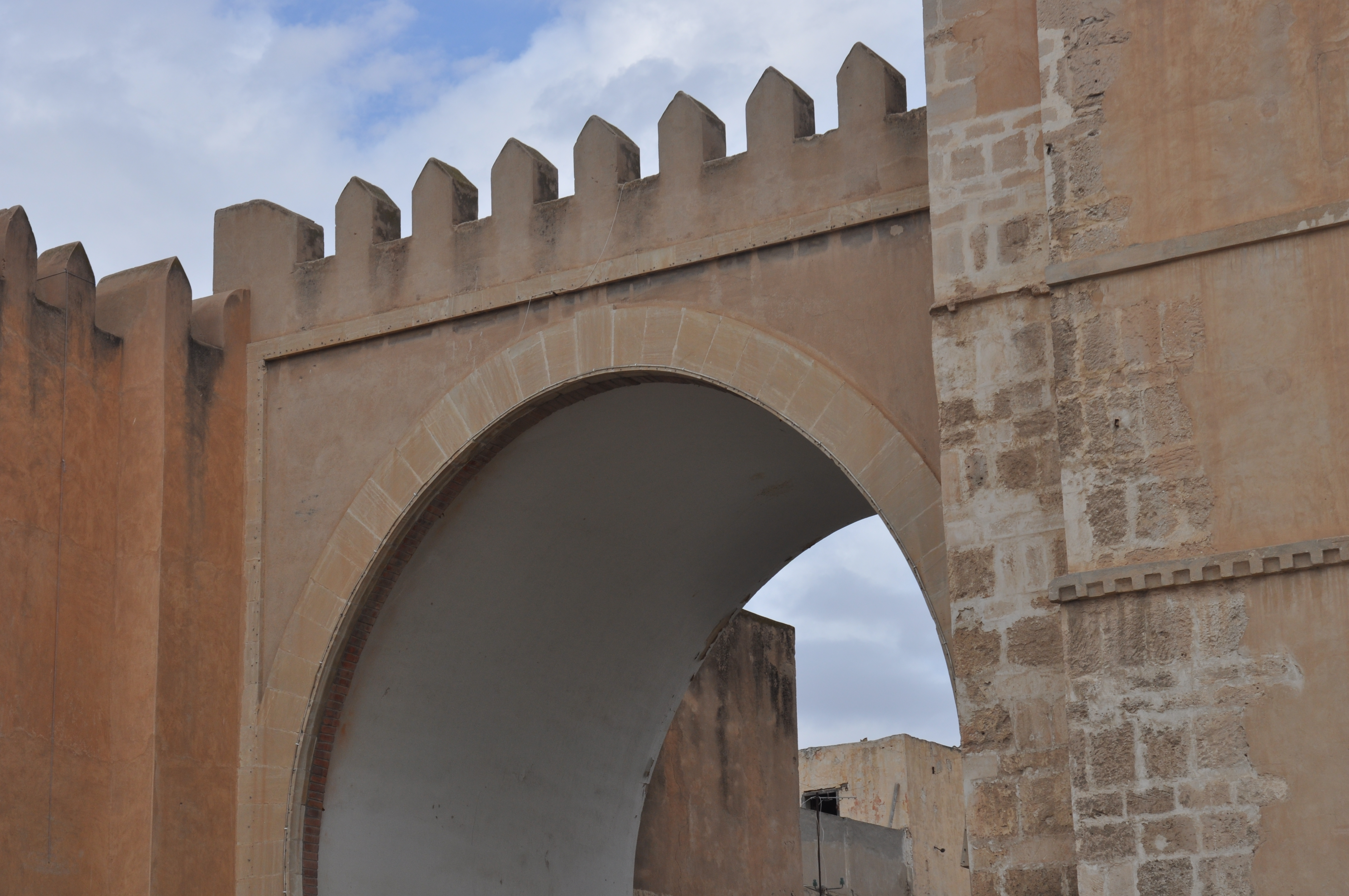
Arch of the new entrance

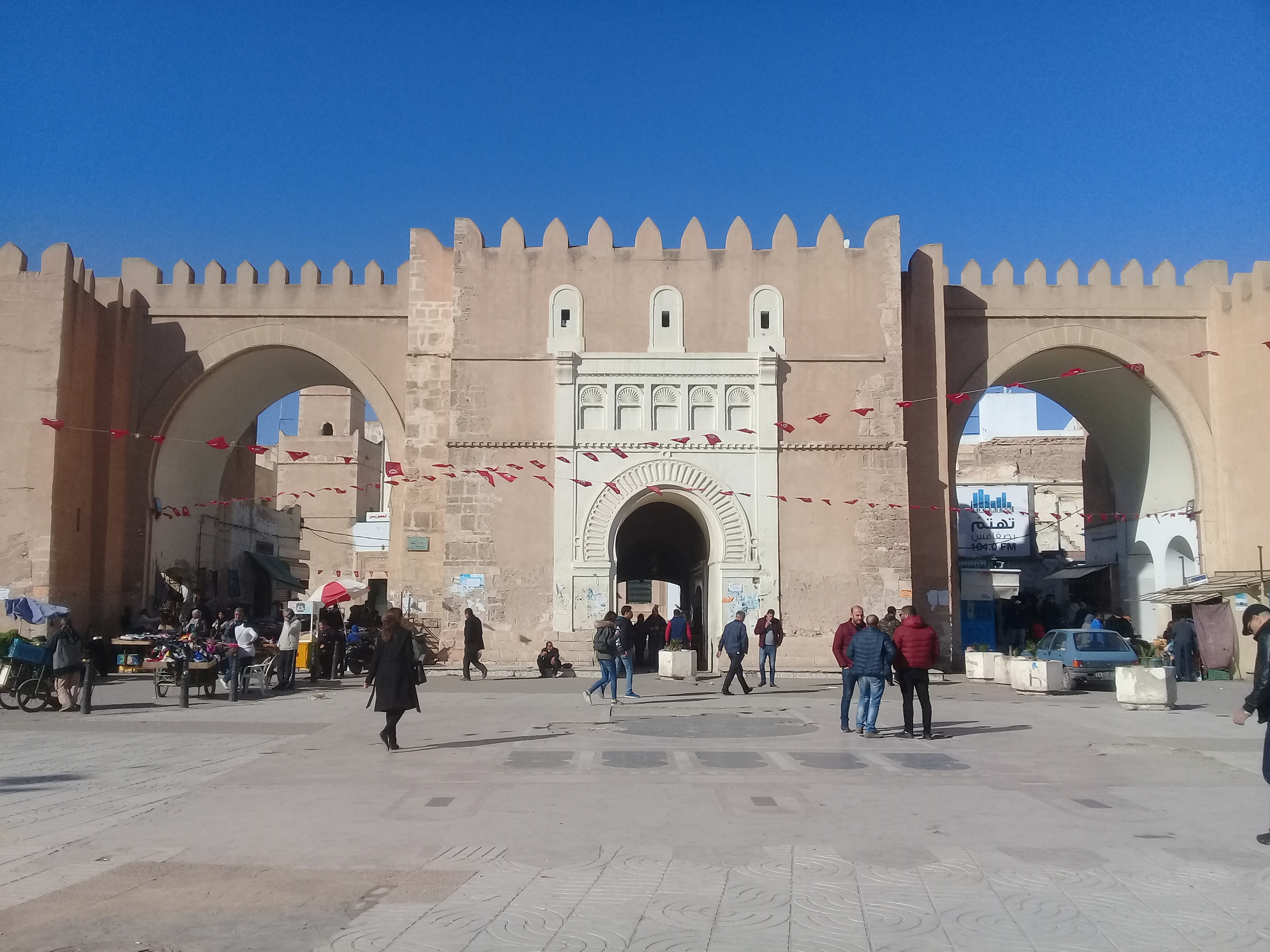
The vehicular entrances with the France door in the center

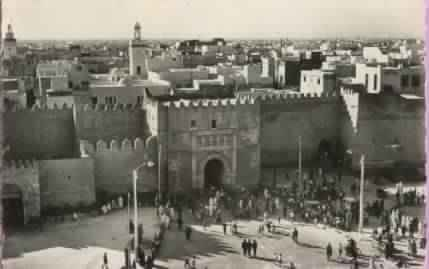
Bab Diwan in 1954

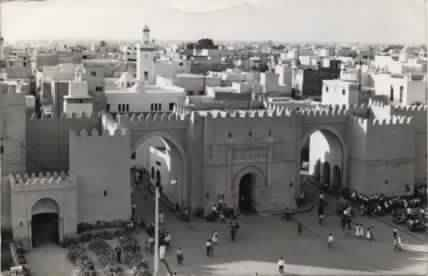
Bab Diwan in 1960

== Gate Diagram ==
The level of pavement inside the gate is actually lower than that of the plaza outside. The cobbled path that leads between the two gates has a kerb at both sides, but is interrupted by the western of the two vehicle entrances. The cobbles and kerbs continue in the central block of wall that forms the rest of Bab Diwan. Their construction required the demolition of the section of wall they occupy - walls that had been rebuilt after World War II collateral damages.
