= Sidi El Bahri Mosque =

Mosque in Sfax, Tunisia

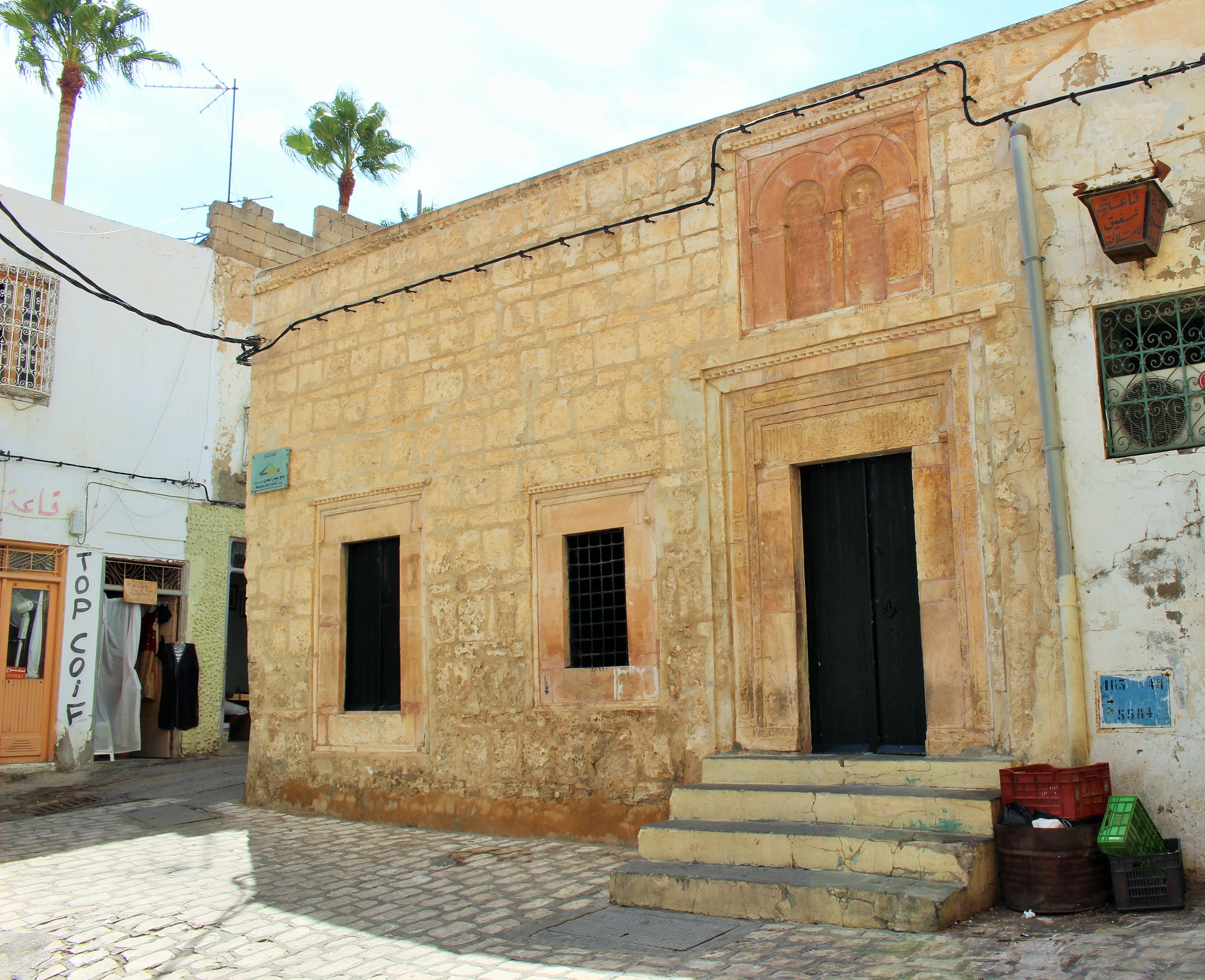
Sidi El Bahri Mosque

Sidi El Bahri Mosque, also called masjed Sidi El Bahri (Arabic: مسجد سيدي البحري), is one of the historical mosques of the medina of Sfax, Tunisia. It is classified as a national monument since 1922.

== Location ==
The mosque is located on the southern part of the medieval city of Sfax. It opens, at the same time, on the Kasbah's street and the Bab Diwan square. Thanks to this strategic location, the Sidi El Bahri mosque played other roles besides its religious function: it had a defensive function, controlling the passengers flood through of the medina's main entrance, Bab Diwan, as well as an economic role, supervising commercial activities and financial exchanges, especially during the Hafsid era.

== History ==
Due to lack of documentation, the history of this mosque is still unclear. It is mentioned in registers of deeds of habous as well as in the inventory of monuments set by the students of the Military School of Bardo in the middle of the 19th century. The architectural style of the mihrab of this mosque suggests that it was built during the hafsid dynasty's reign. According to an epigraphic inscription that decorates the monument, the construction of the building is attributed to Al Kotti family, known for its famous constructors in the medina of Sfax. Another inscription dating from 1789 commemorates restoration work on the monument during the Husainid era.

== Description ==
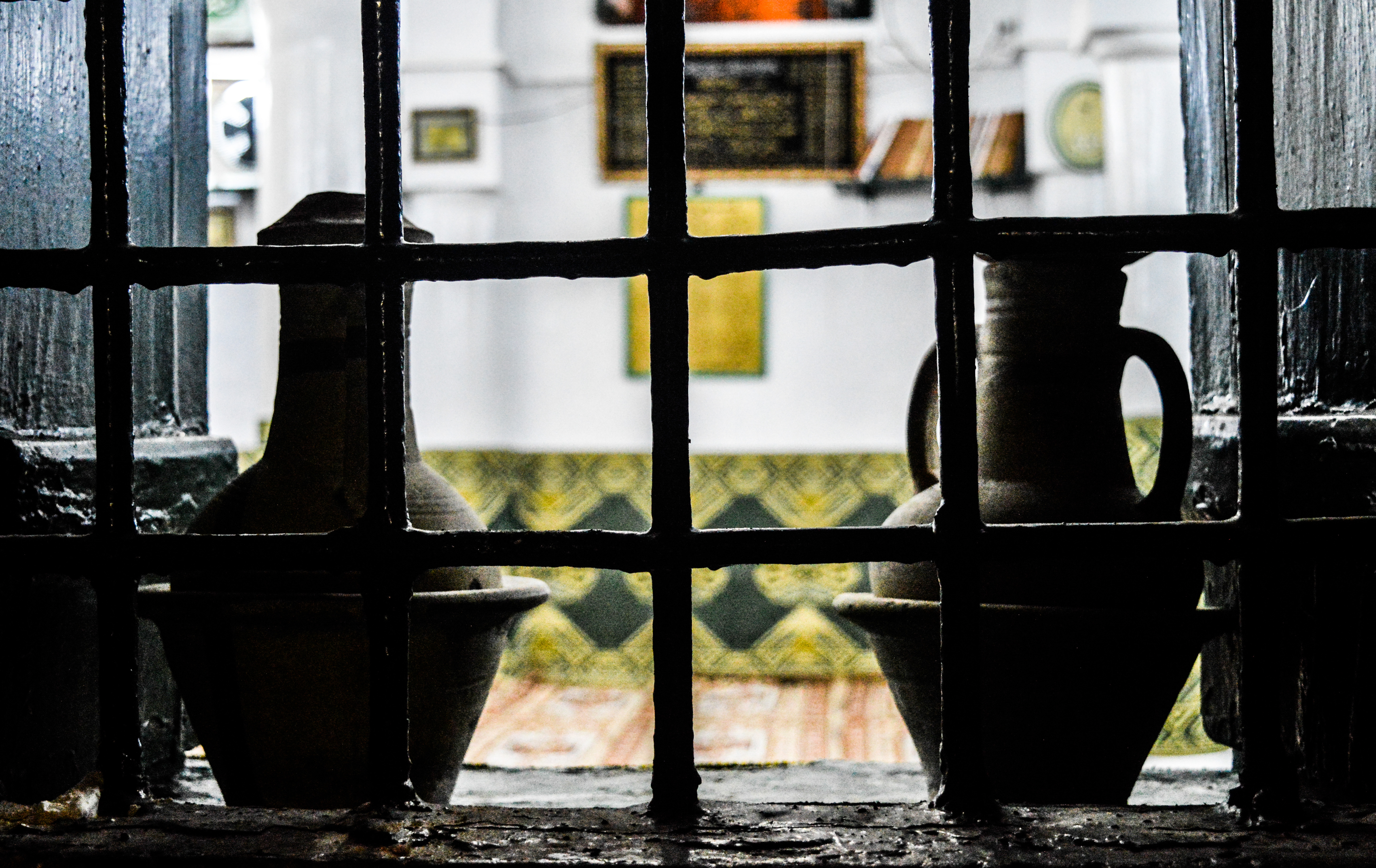
The mosque's prayer room

The Sidi El Bahri mosque is composed of a rectangular prayer room measuring 7.5 meters long and 7 meters wide. Its vaulted roof rests on four central columns which divide the space into three longitudinal naves, parallel to the wall of the qibla, and three other naves that are perpendicular to it. There is a local traditional decoration, common to many other monuments of the medina. Its mihrab, of simple style, is very similar to the one in Sidi Ali Ennouri Mausoleum's prayer room. The building has a stone facade with carved stone framed openings and epigraphic inscriptions on top of the front door.
