= Souk El Khodhra =

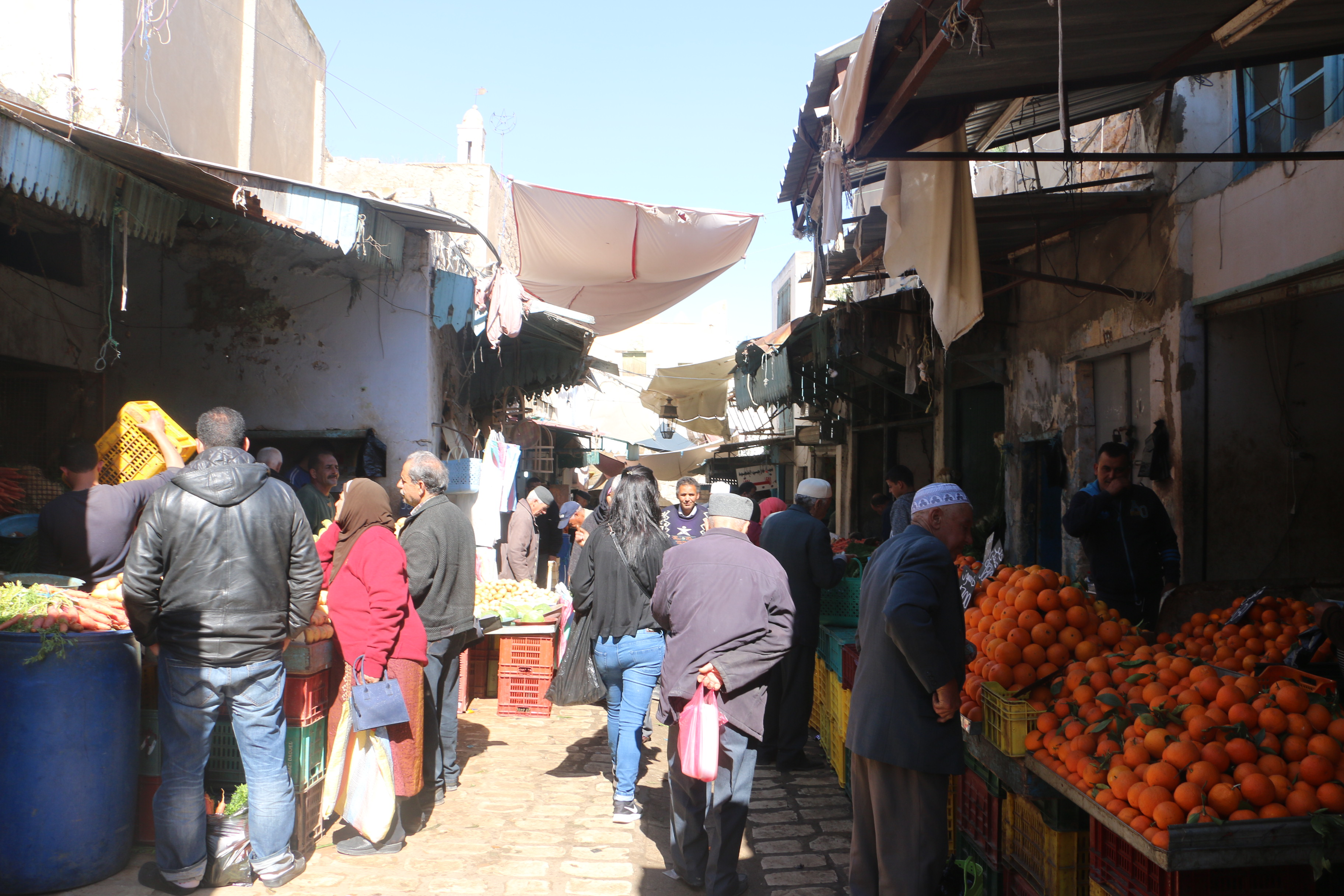
Souk El Khodhra

Souk El Khodhra (Arabic: سوق الخضرة), also called the Vegetable Market is one of the souks, or markets, of the medina of Sfax, Tunisia.

The souk is located in the path right next to the Great Mosque of Sfax. It has various shops that are distributed along the path. Vegetables and fruits that are produced in the medina of Sfax are sold in the souk. The souk opens on mornings only.
