= El Ajouzine Mosque =

Mosque in Sfax, Tunisia

- جامع العجوزين
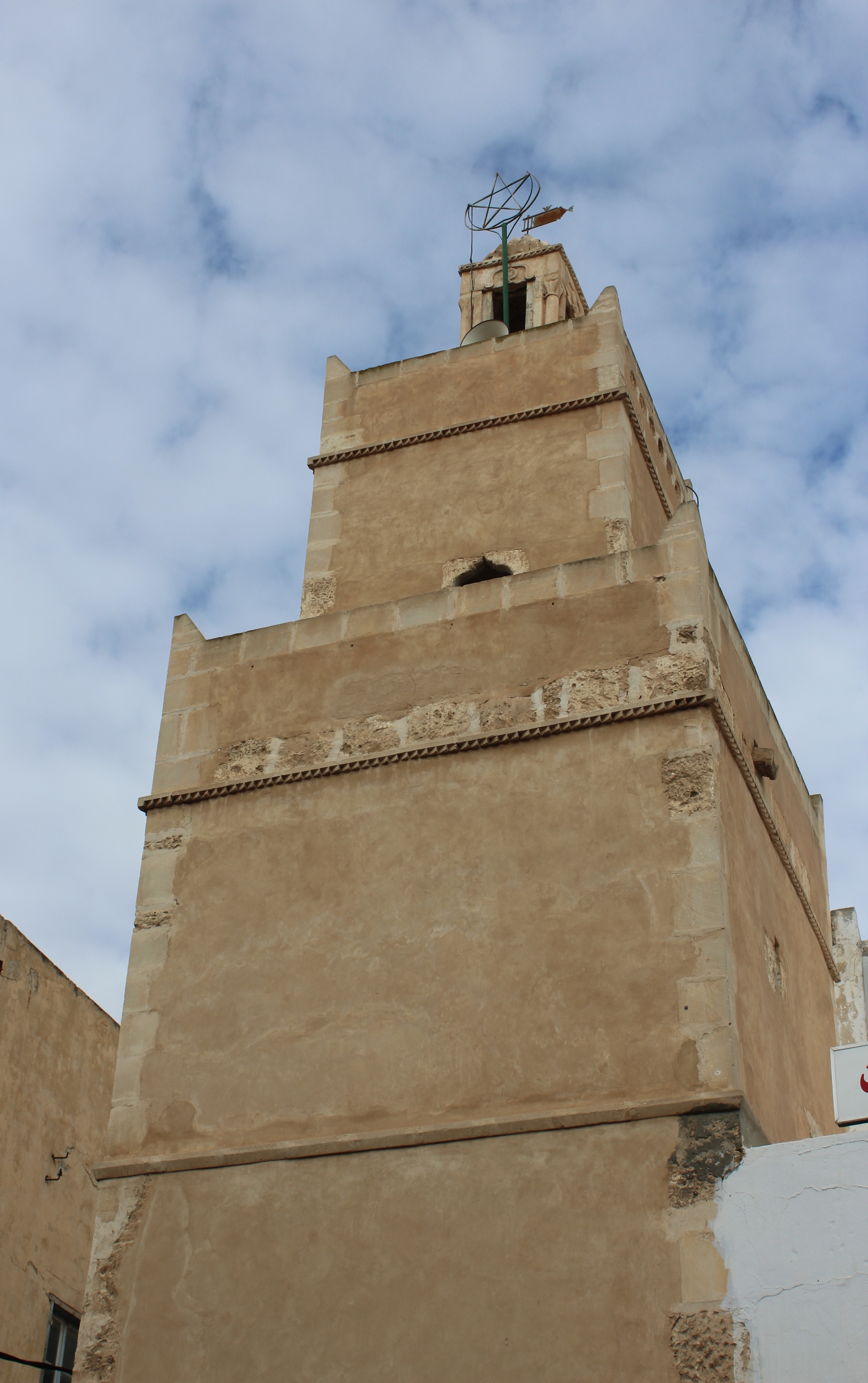

Religion
- Affiliation: Islam

Location
- Municipality: Medina of Sfax
- Country: Tunisia
- Interactive map of El Ajouzine Mosque

Architecture
- Type: mosque

Al Ajouzine Mosque (Arabic: جامع العجوزين) is one of the old mosques of the medina of Sfax, Tunisia.

== Location ==
The mosque is located in the southern part of the medieval city, just in front of Bab Diwan, the biggest and oldest entrance of the medina. Also, it can be reached by the Grand mosque's street. It is very close to Sidi Abdelmoula Mosque.

== History and etymology ==
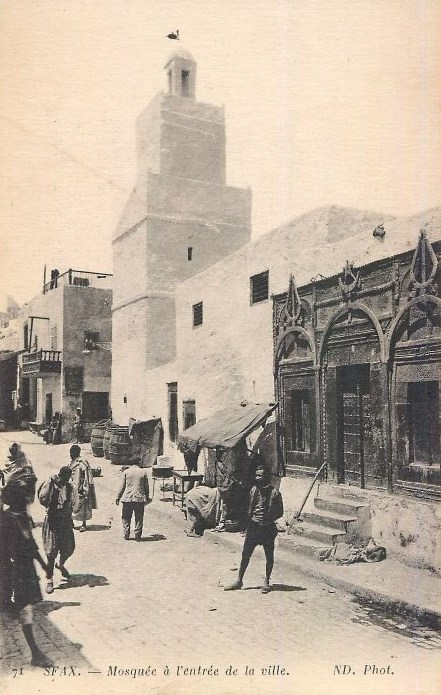
The mosque in the 20th century

According to the local popular stories, El Ajouzine mosque is basically the result of the joining of two old houses belonging to two old women of the city. Living alone without families to take care of, they decided to donate their two adjacent houses to combine and make a mosque, which explains the name of the mosque, literally meaning "the two old women" in Arabic.

As early as 1922, the mosque evolved from a simple prayer room to a mosque hosting Friday prayers (Al Jumaa in arabic).

Like many monuments of the medina of Sfax, the mosque got hugely damaged because of the bombing attacks during the Second World War. Restoration work to safeguard the monument was carried out by the municipality of Sfax in 1963.

== Description ==
The building has a unique architecture. It consists of two halls, to the east and west. And this structure supports the popular story of merging two adjacent houses with patio. Its minaret is composed of three levels with a square base. It is very similar to the Great mosque's minaret from which it got inspired.
