= Sidi Abdelmoula Mosque =

Mosque in Sfax, Tunisia

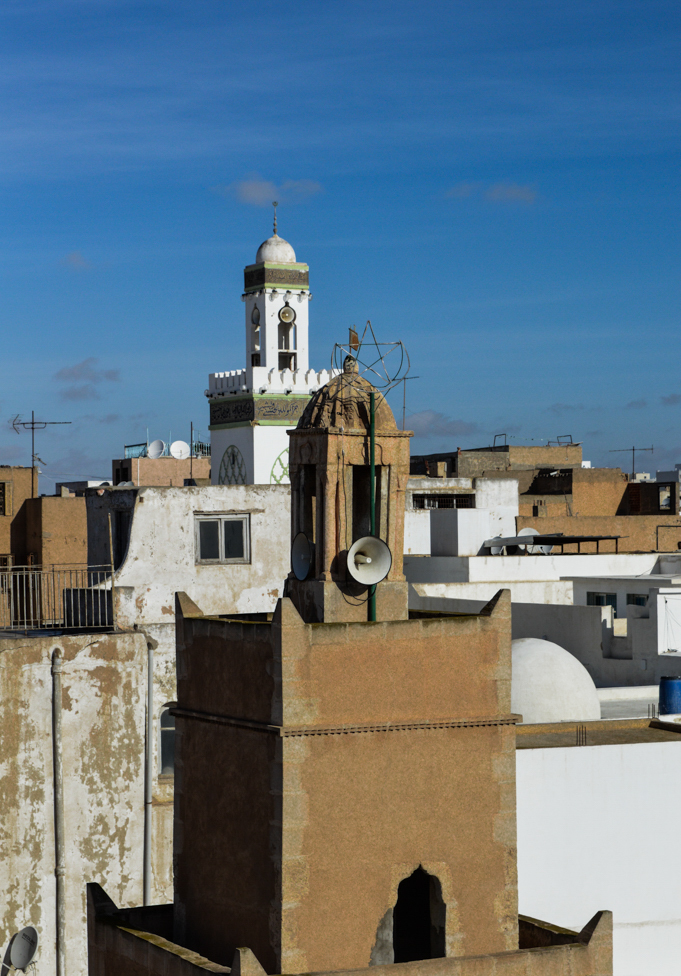
Sidi Abdelmoula Mosque

Sidi Abdelmoula Mosque (Arabic: جامع سيدي عبد المولى) is one of the old mosques of the medina of Sfax, Tunisia.

== Location ==
The mosque is located in the southern part of the medieval city, near El Ajouzine Mosque. It can be reached through three different streets: The Great Mosque's street in the west, El Andalus street and El Issaouiya street in the north.

== History ==
Compared to the other mosques of the medina, Sidi Abdelmoula mosque is considered a modern one. It is the result of joining two small neighboring prayer rooms: Sidi Abelmoula Siala's and Mohamed El Saffar's. Between 1936 and 1937, it underwent extension works by joining another adjacent house, in order to be able to host the Friday prayer (called Jumaa in Arabic).

== Description ==
The building is currently composed of a rectangular prayer room with four naves with a marble decorated a mihrab for the imam to lead the prayers. It has also its own minaret in the northern entrance with a maghrebin style.
