= Sidi Ali Ennouri Mausoleum =

Zawiya in Sfax, Tunisia

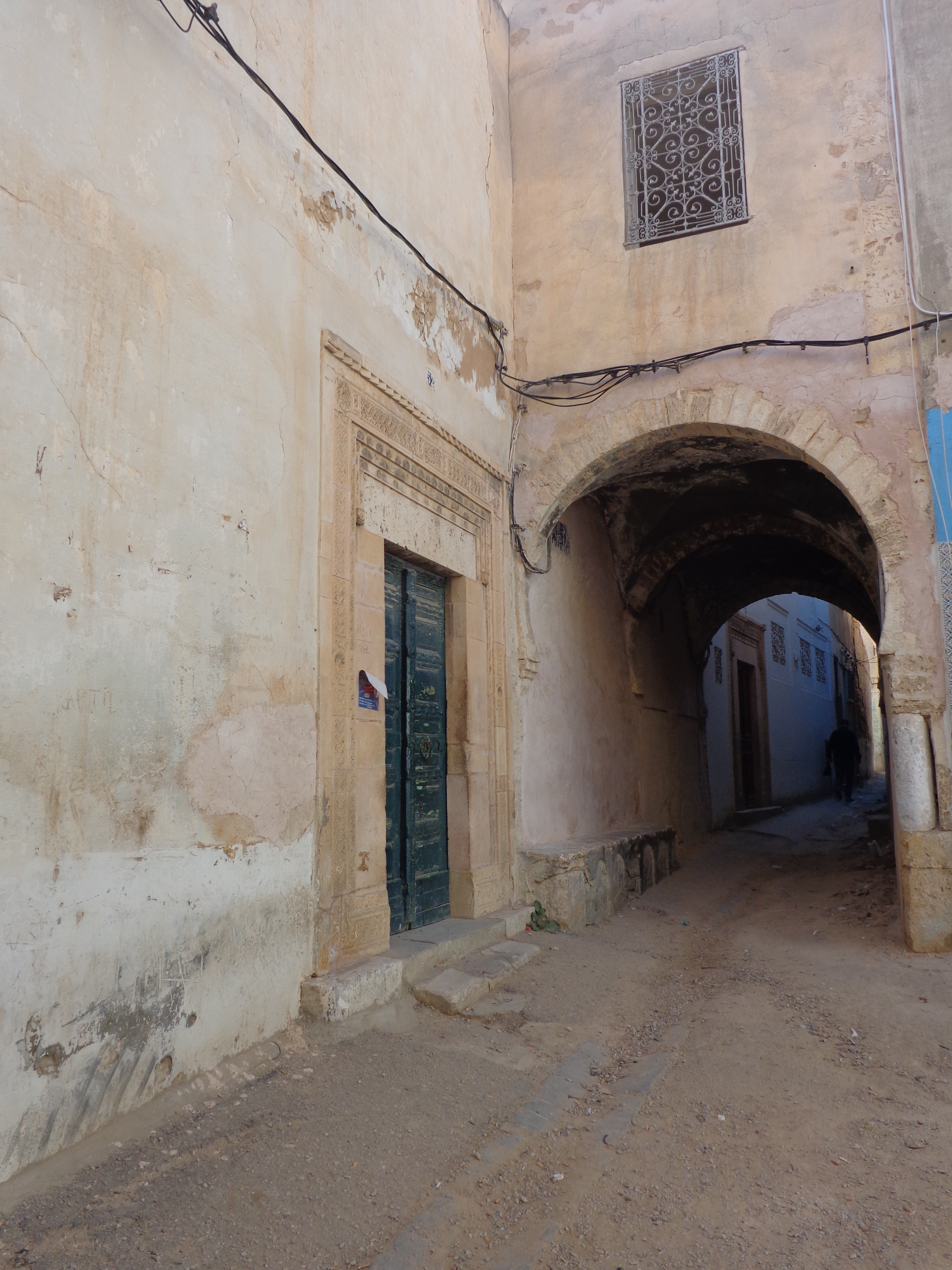
Entrance of Sidi Ali Ennouri Mosque and Mausoleum

The Sidi Ali Ennouri Mausoleum (Arabic: زاوية سيدي علي النوري), also known as Al Zaouia Al Nouria (Arabic: الزاوية النورية) is one of the mausoleums of the medina of Sfax and the headquarters of the Sufi brotherhood in Sfax.

== Location ==
The mausoleum is located in the aristocratic residential quarter in the eastern part of the medina, just next to Dar Jallouli, the traditional arts museum of Sfax. It opens onto Ali Ennouri Street on the east and Sidi Khalil Street on the north.

== History ==
Written sources do not give an exact date of the construction of this mausoleum, but most historians agree that it was in the second half of the 17th century, during the Muradid dynasty. At first, it was the home of a Sfaxian saint, Sidi Ali Ennouri (1643–1706). Returning from his studies in Cairo in 1668, this saint founded a Sufi brotherhood and transformed his private house into a mausoleum, where he gave religious instruction. In addition, this mausoleum provided accommodation for foreign students who come to receive their education in the Great Mosque of Sfax. The building also served for political and military purposes as a base for organizing the Sfaxian struggle against the Order of Knights of the Hospital of Saint John of Jerusalem in their clashes at the beginning of the 18th century.

== Gallery ==
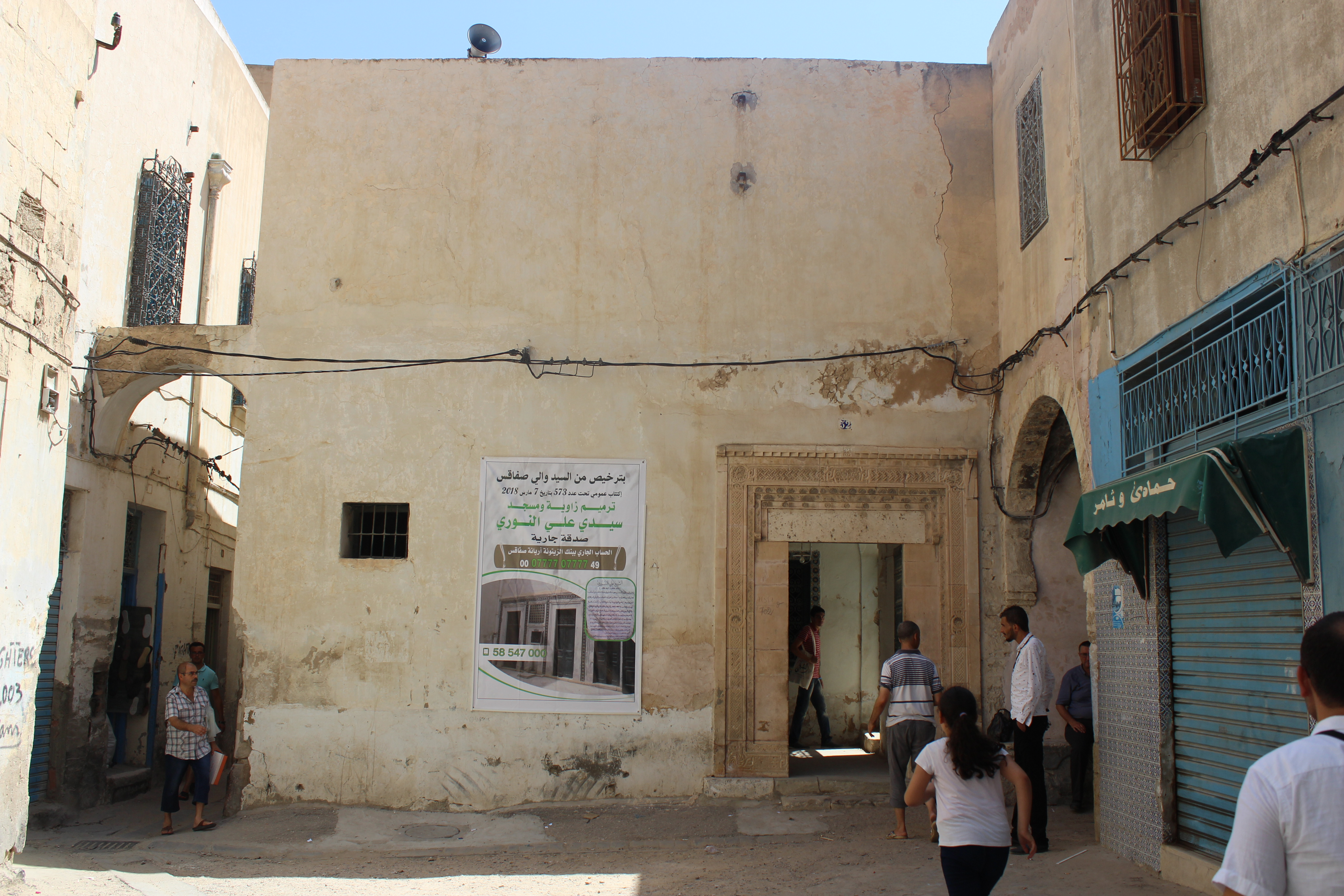
Facade of the mausoleum

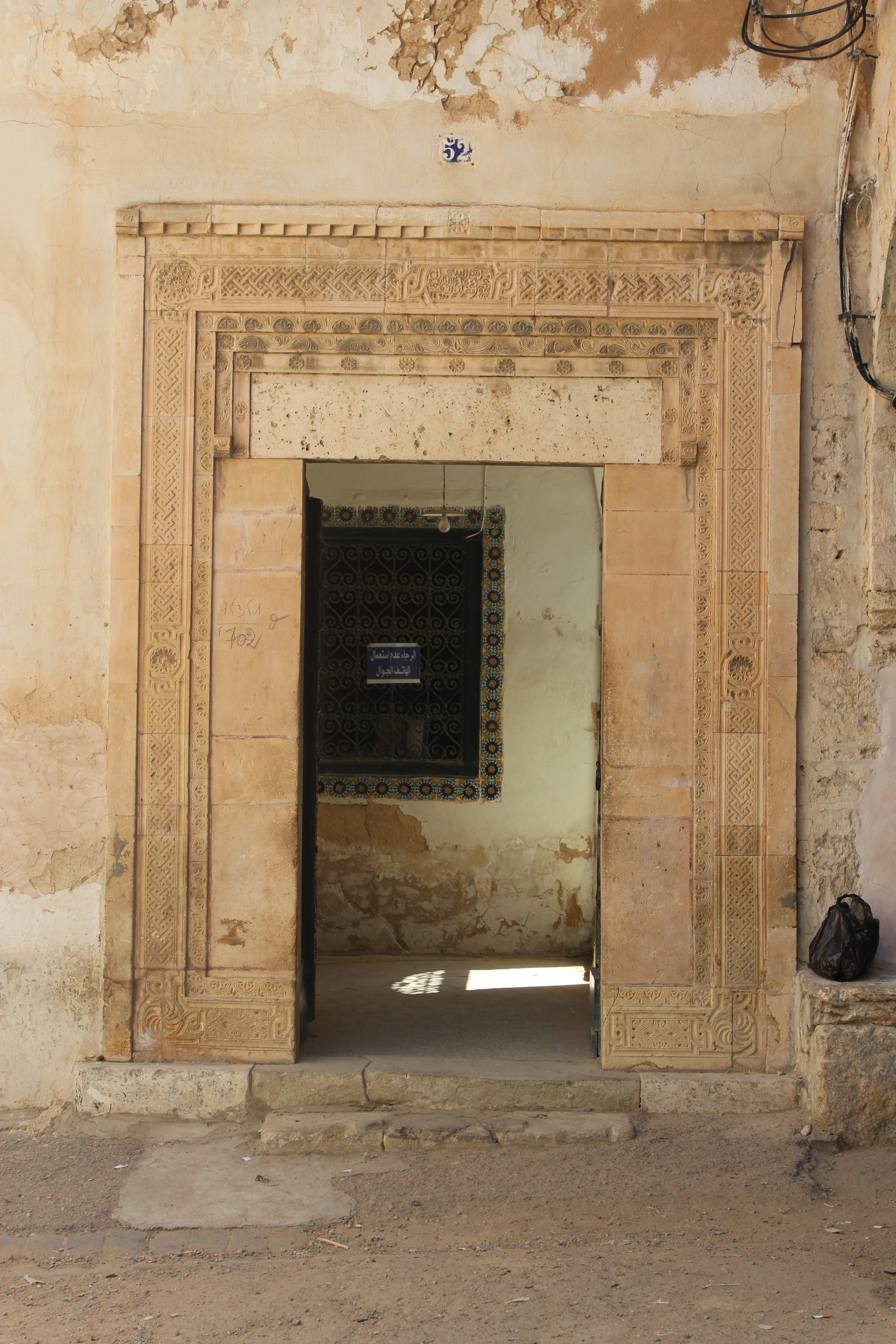
Door to the mausoleum

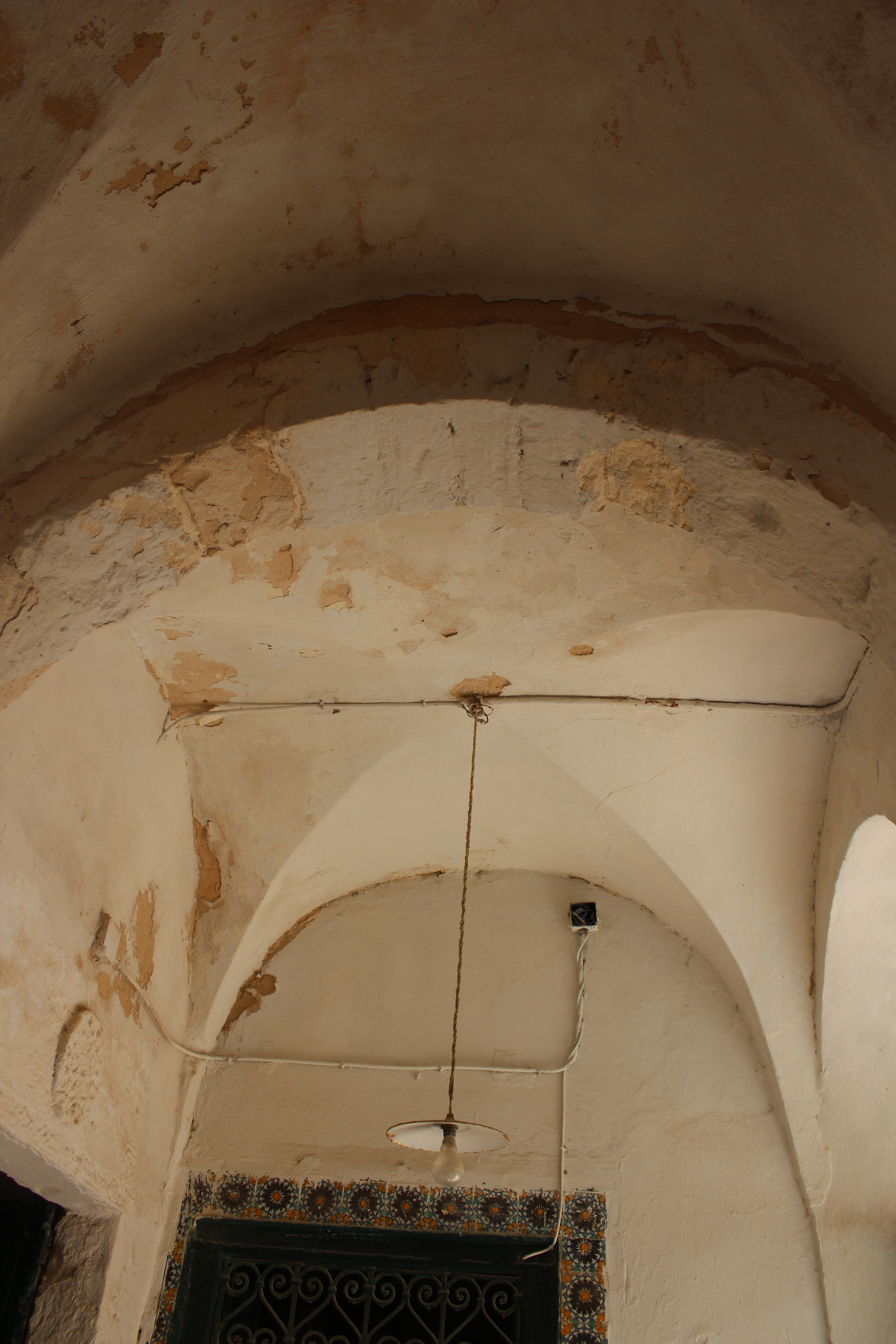
Entrance of the mausoleum

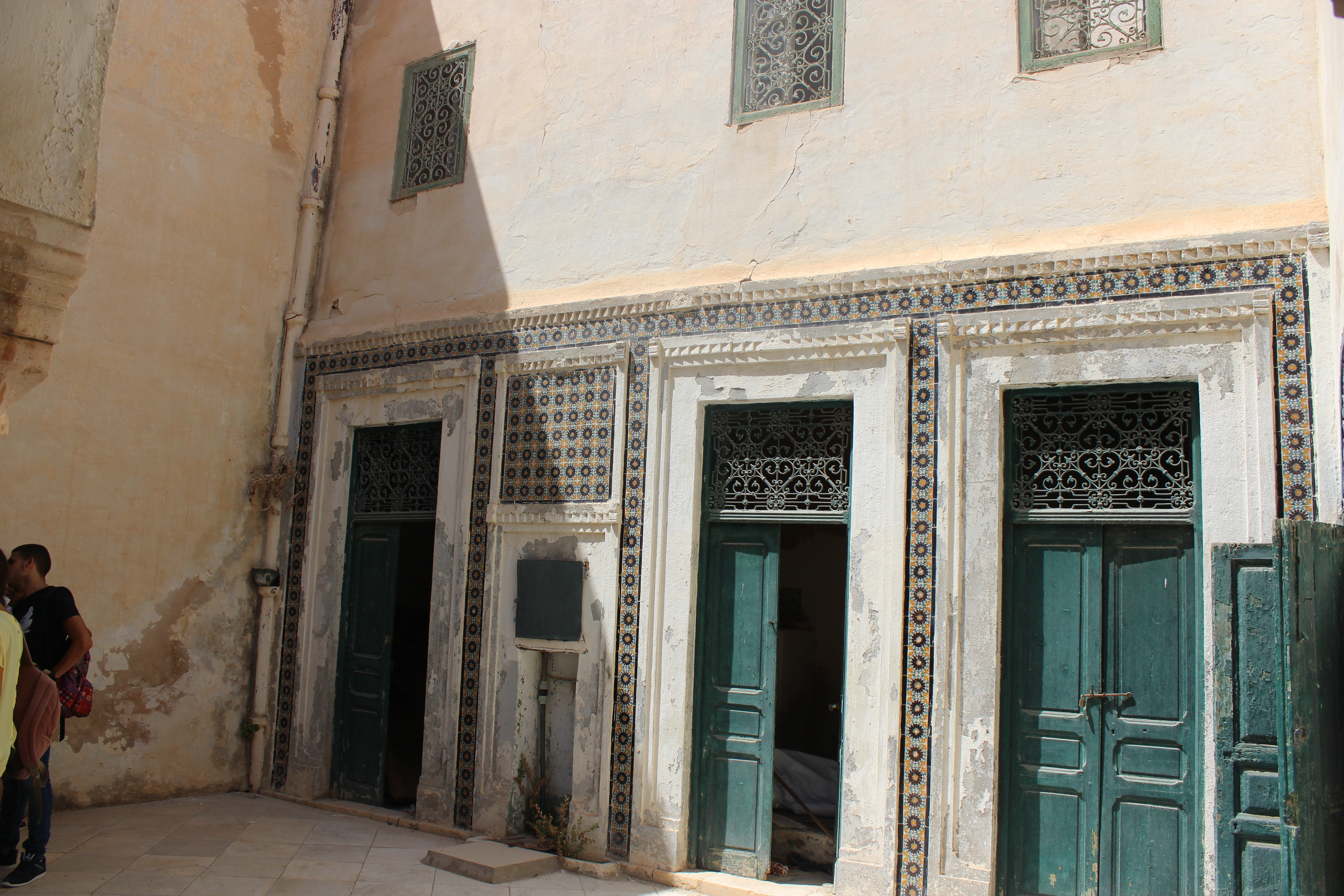
Facade of the main court

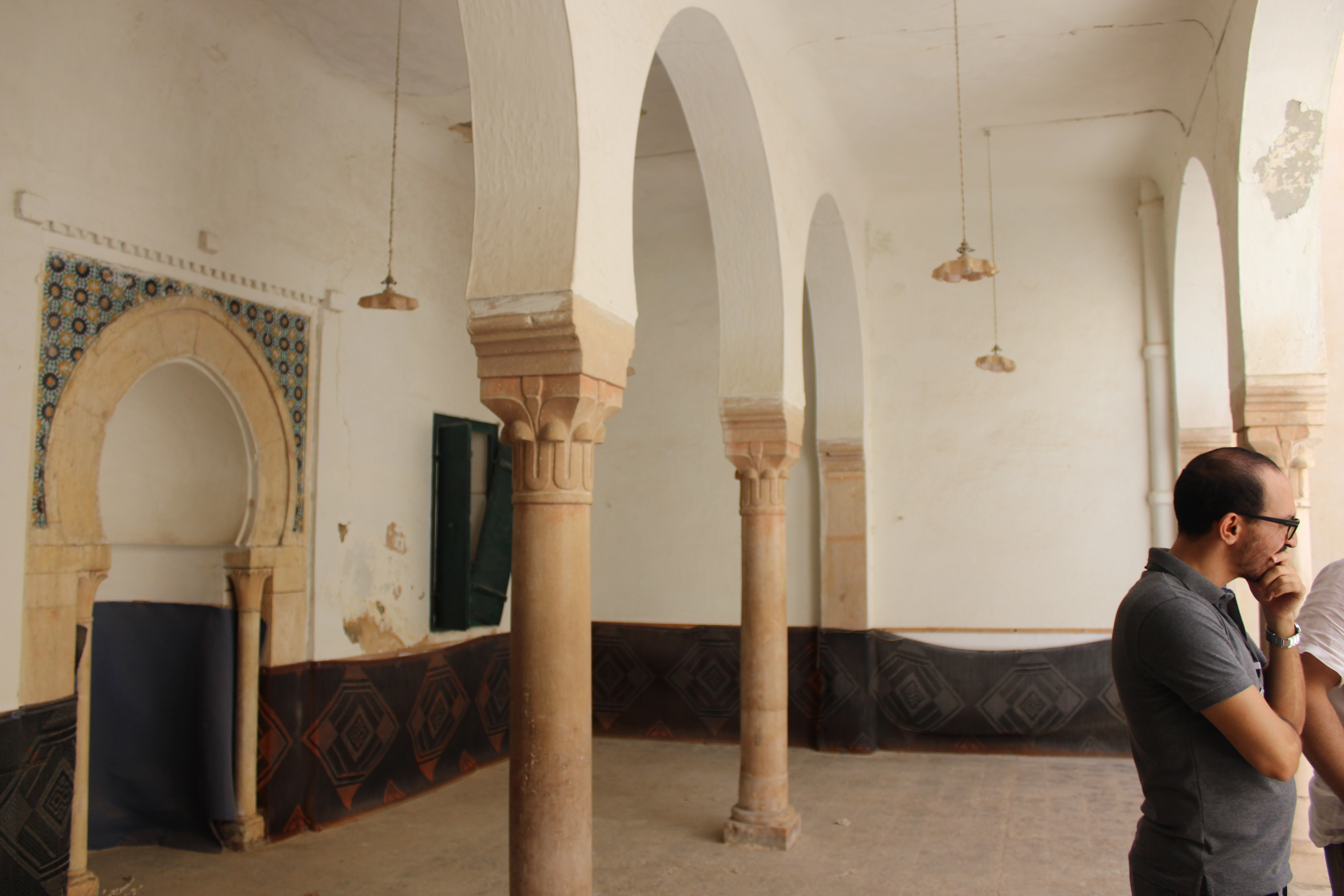
The main court

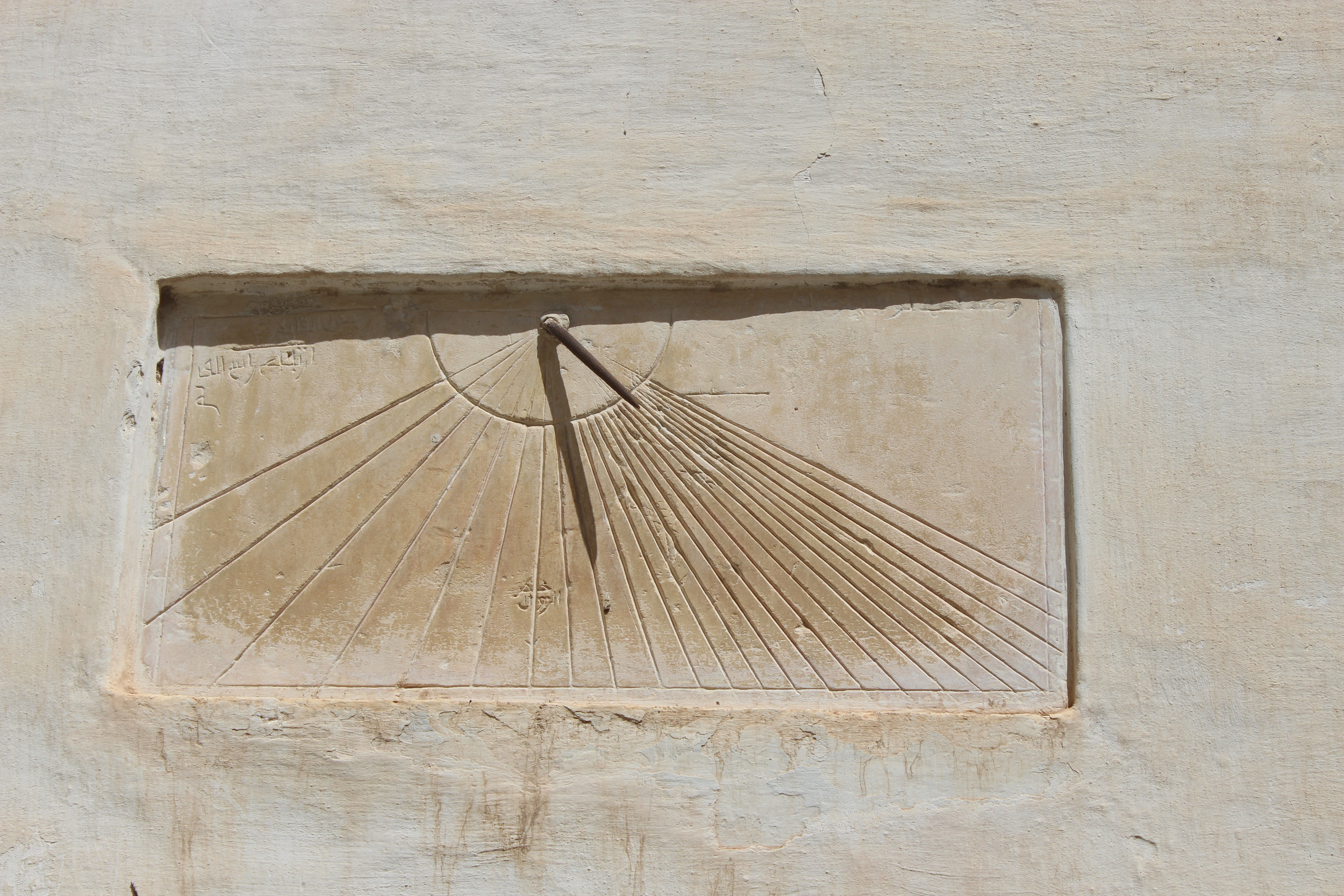
Sun clock in the court

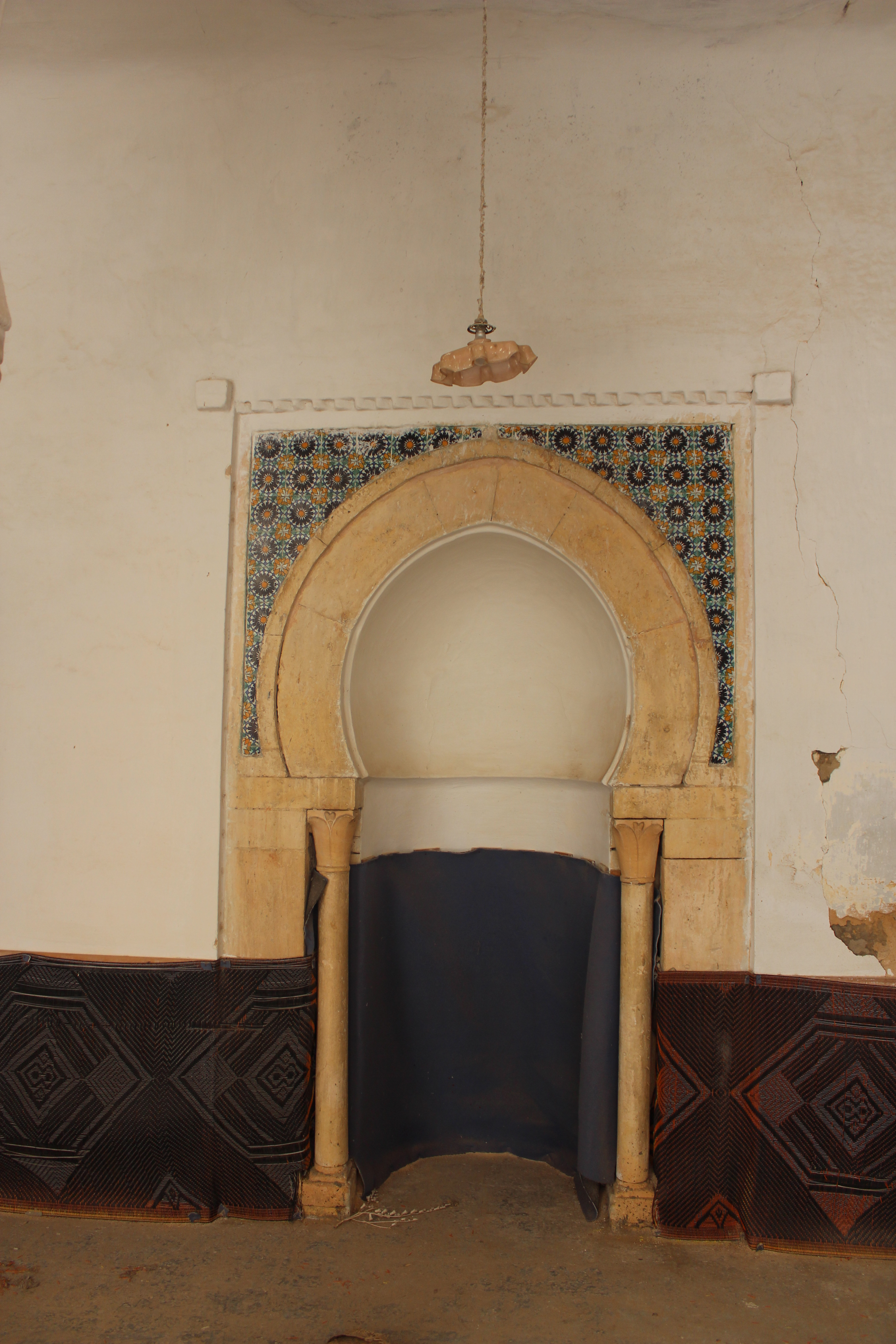
Mihrab of the court

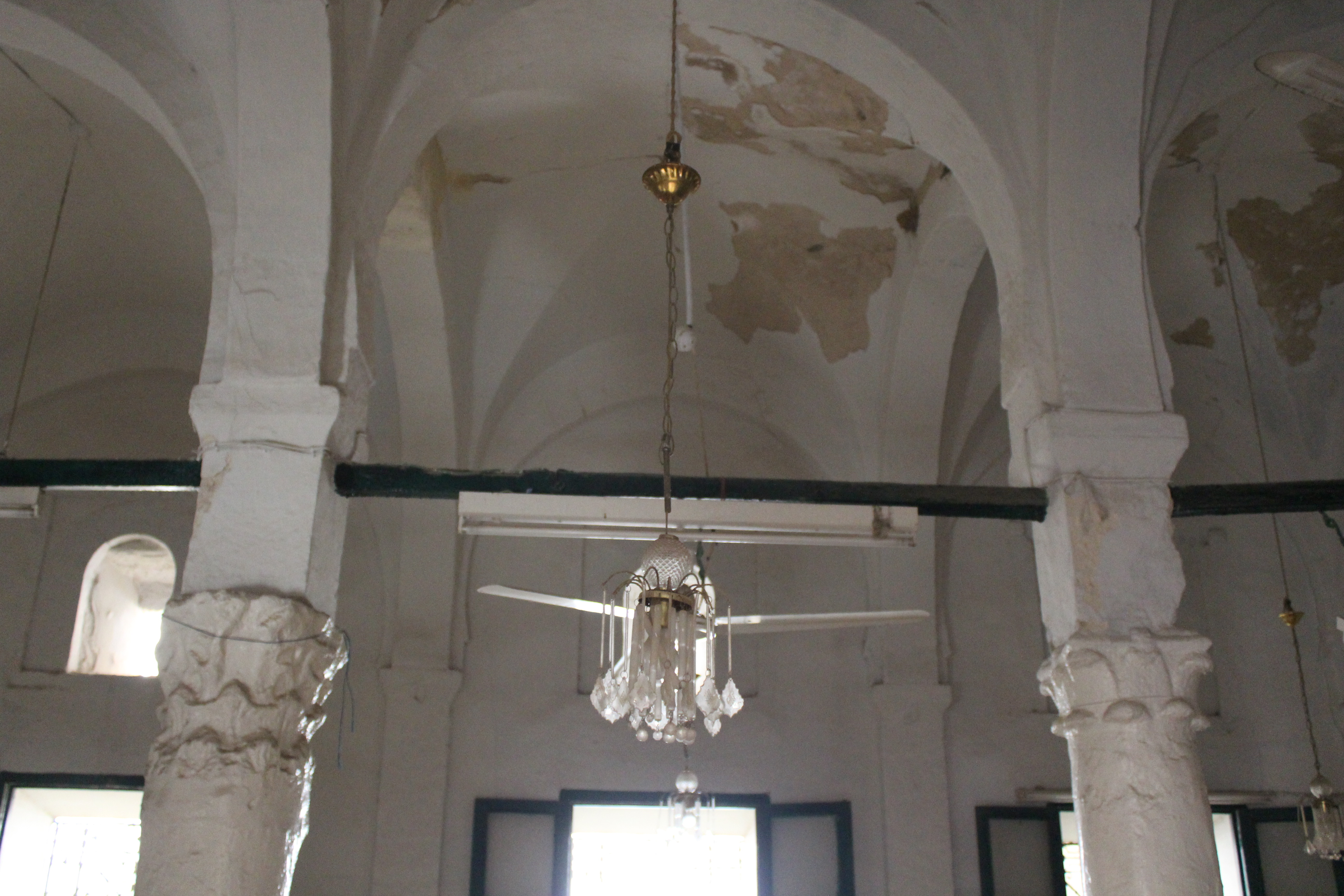
Prayer room

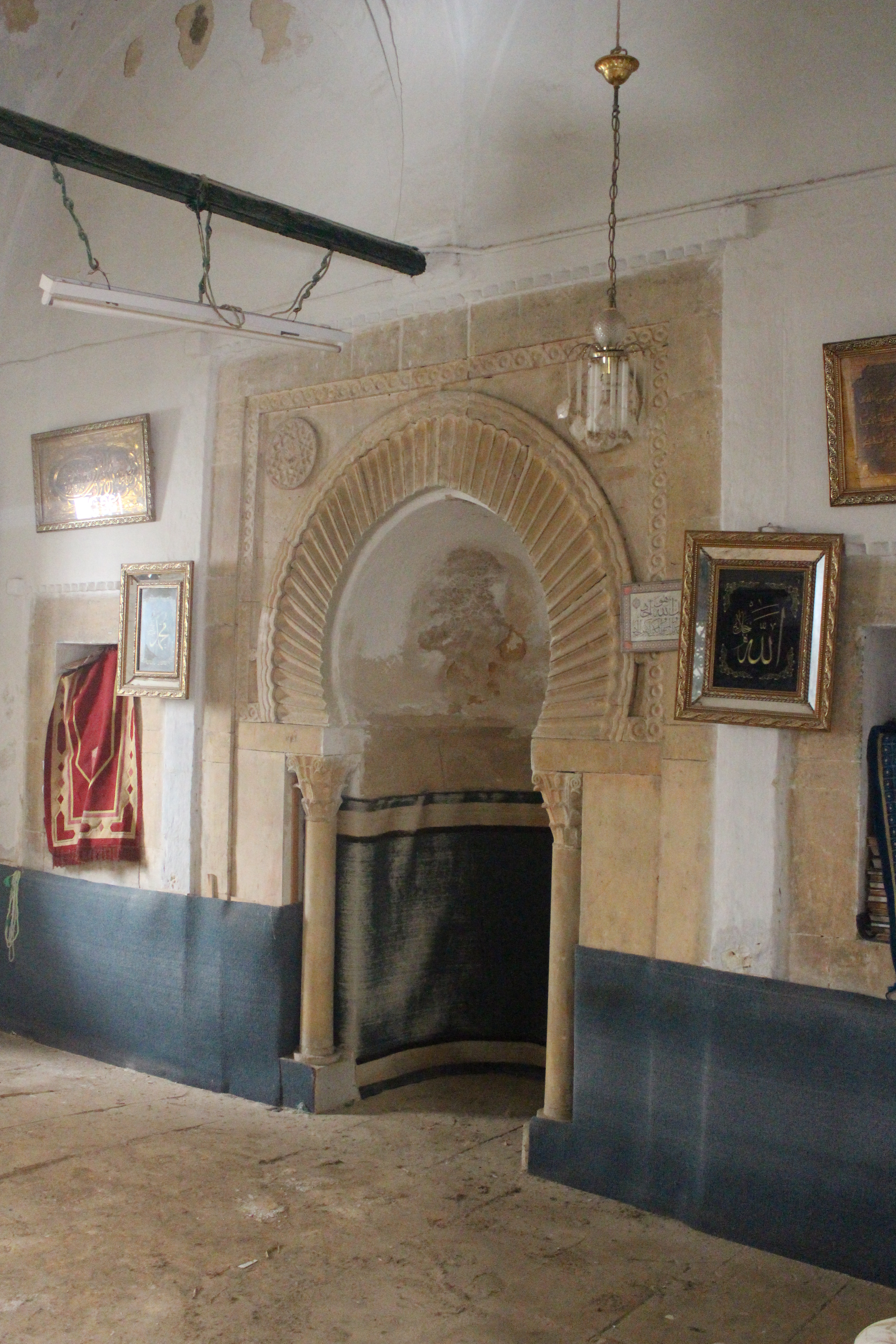
Mihrab of the prayer room
