= Great Mosque of Sfax =

Historic mosque in Sfax, Tunisia

- الجامع الكبير بصفاقس
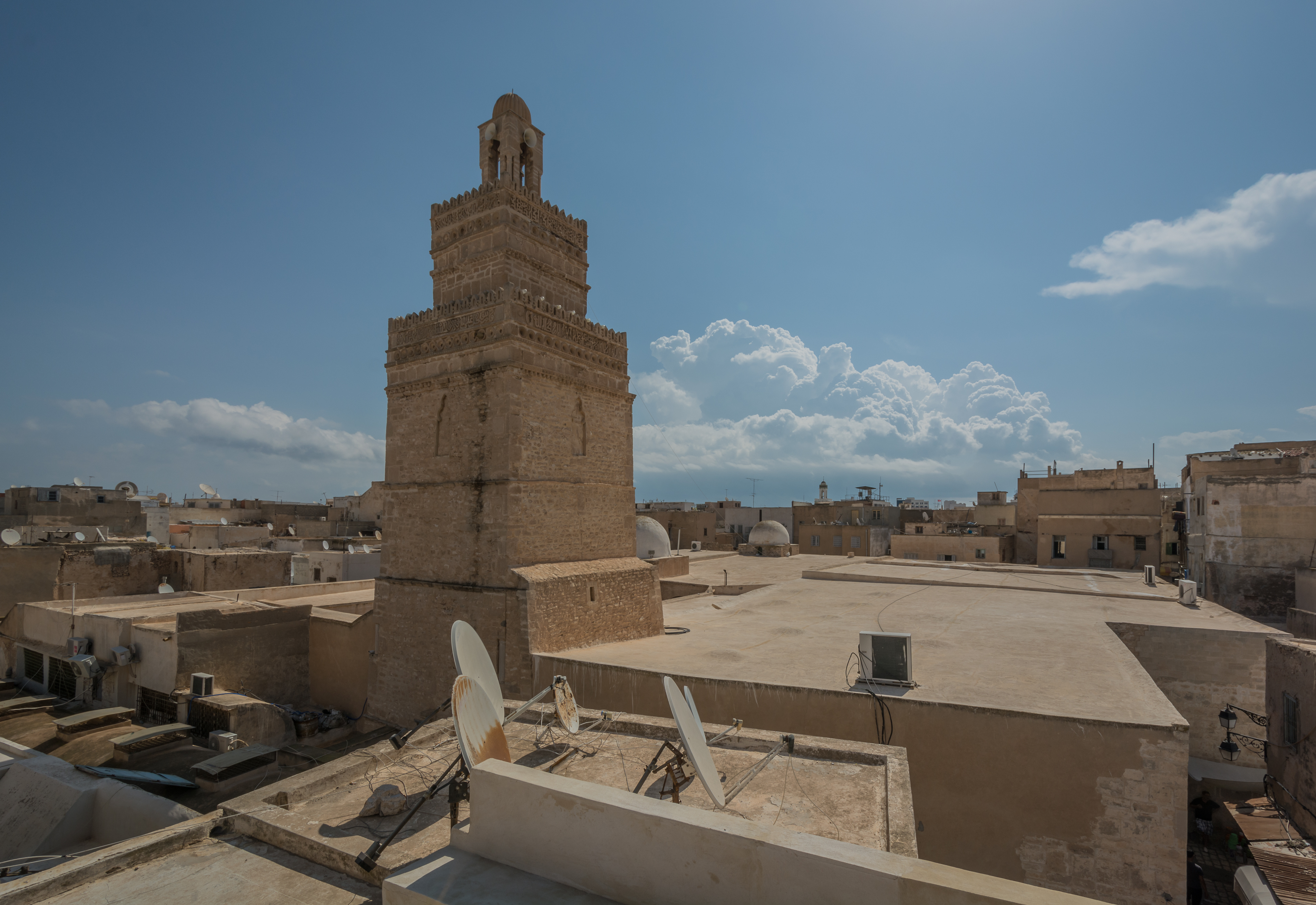

Religion
- Affiliation: Islam
- Status: Active

Location
- Location: Sfax, Tunisia
- Interactive map of Great Mosque of Sfax
- Coordinates: 34°44′10″N 10°45′39″E

Architecture
- Type: Mosque
- Style: Moorish (Aghlabid, Zirid)
- Established: c. 849

Specifications
- Dome: 2
- Minaret: 1
- Minaret height: approx. 25 metres (82 ft)
- Materials: brick, stone, marble

The Great Mosque of Sfax (Arabic: الجامع الكبير بصفاقس) was the most important mosque in the old city of Sfax, Tunisia. It was initially built towards the mid-9th century under the rule of the Aghlabid dynasty. The mosque was the urban and religious heart of the city and it underwent several major modifications in later periods. Architecturally, it is notable for its minaret and its unusually decorated eastern façade.

== Location ==
The mosque is located in the center of the ancient city of Sfax and occupies the very center of it, which made the layout of the city of Sfax very similar to the planning of Kufa, one of the first Islamic cities. Since its construction, it has been surrounded by the most important production centers and markets in the city, and continues to maintain its economic value to this day.

== History ==
=== Foundation ===
The Great Mosque of Sfax is not precisely dated, but assumed to be built around the same time, c. 849 CE, but it was extensively modified after the Aghlabid period. The sponsor of its construction was reputedly the qadi 'Ali ibn Aslam al-Jabanyani, a student of the Maliki scholar Imam Sahnun. The original layout of the mosque was probably very similar to that of the Great Mosque of Kairouan, rebuilt early that century under the Aghlabid emir Ziyadat Allah I.

=== Zirid period ===
Repairs to the mosque took place in first 980 and then 988, under the rule of the Zirids (vassals of the Fatimid Caliphs). In the 10th century the mosque was reduced in size by suppressing its western half, giving it a much narrower floor plan and leaving the minaret standing at its corner instead of at the middle of the courtyard's northern side, as was usual at the time. Inscriptions in the mosque record renovations in both 988 and 1085. Georges Marçais attributed the reduction of the mosque's area to 988 and its redecoration to 1085. The original mihrab was replaced with a new one of Zirid style at the middle of the now shortened qibla (southern) wall. During the Zirid period the original Aghlabid minaret, which was probably a slender two-story tower, was encased inside a larger new minaret, which was built around it in the early 11th century. The unusually decorated exterior eastern façade of the mosque is also attributed to the Zirid period by multiple scholars, including Georges Marçais and Lucien Golvin.

=== Ottoman period ===
The mosque was enlarged in the 18th century, during the Beylik period, by re-extending the prayer hall to the west, giving it its present layout. The expansion took place in 1758 and in 1774. As a result of this expansion, the mosque's surface area became similar to its hypothesized original size, but the courtyard remained small compared to the prayer hall. A new mihrab was crafted in the middle of the qibla wall of the expanded prayer hall, while the old Zirid mihrab was walled off. The architects in charge of this work were Haj Sa'id al-Qatti, the chief mason, and the artist Tahar al-Manif, who is also named as the craftsman of the mihrab.

In the 19th century the minaret was renovated by Ibn Yemlûl al-Bergavâtî.

=== French occupation ===
The period of French occupation was considered to be the darkest period for the great mosque since its establishment. The bombs dropped by the French military fleet during the siege in 1881 had caused substantial damages to the minaret of the mosque. After the French soldiers succeeded in taking over the city, they turned the mosque into barracks where soldiers wash their clothes, and they used the bowl of the mosque to connect their horses. During World War II, in 1942, two other bombs fell on the mosque. Two local contractors, Mohamed Trabelsi and Najjar Ali Shaker, took the collateral damage that caused by them.

=== Post-independence ===
After the independence of Tunisia, the mosque received major repairs in its various sections. During the process, a terrace built in its eastern side was demolished to protect the building from rainwater leakage.

== Architecture ==
The mosque consists of a large hypostyle prayer hall, which takes up most of the space, and a much smaller rectangular courtyard (sahn) in the northeast part of the mosque.

=== Prayer hall ===
The prayer hall is composed of 9 naves or aisles perpendicular to the qibla wall (the south wall), divided by rows of arches supported by reused ancient columns (as was the case in the original Aghlabid structure). The hall was probably covered by a flat wooden ceiling originally, but these have since been replaced with masonry groin vaults. The 5 eastern naves were part of the older Zirid-era mosque, while the 4 western ones are part of the later re-enlargement of the mosque. In the eastern section, each nave runs is 6 bays long (i.e. the length of 6 arches). In the western section, the hypostyle naves run the whole length of the mosque, except for the slightly truncated corner where the present day street passes. The central mihrab of the mosque, dating to the 18th-century renovations, is fluted or grooved on the inside and is decorated with Kufic Arabic inscriptions. Above the mihrab is a commemorative inscription by the poet 'Ali al-Ghurab. The former Zirid mihrab, further east, has been reopened after being walled off for many years. The little original decoration that it retains suggests it was probably like the mihrab found in the Great Mosque of Mahdia.

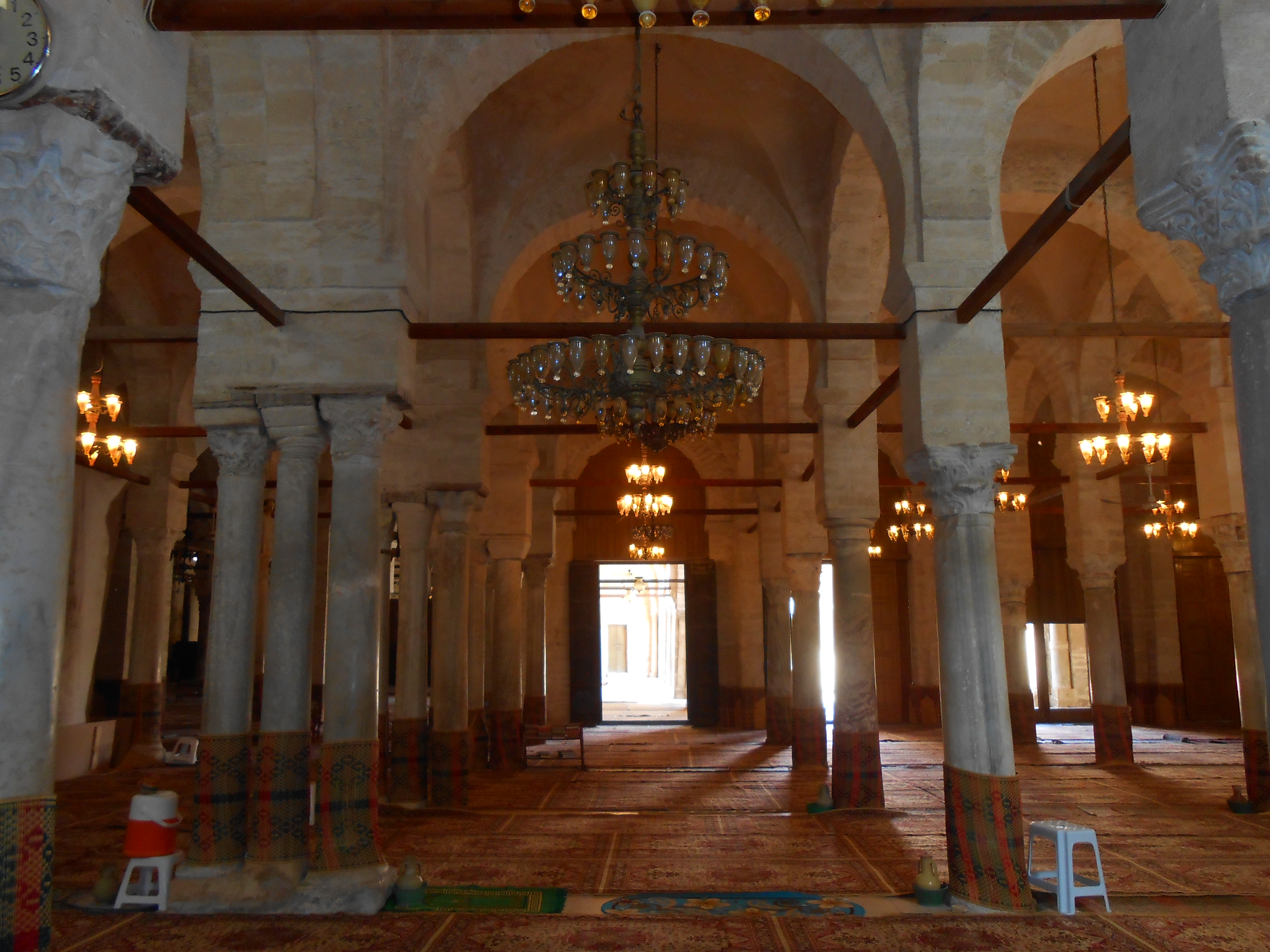
Inside the prayer hall

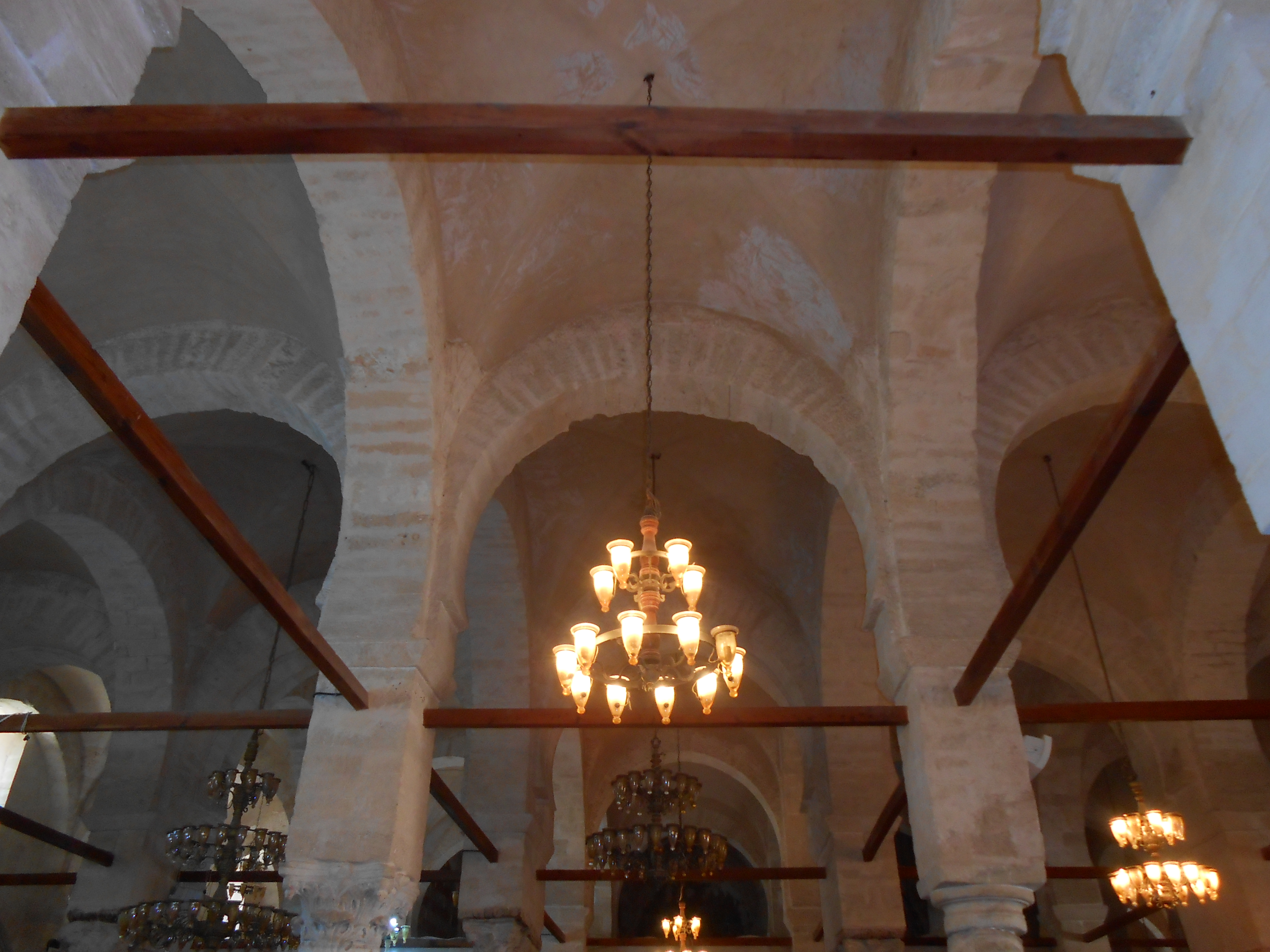
Groin-vaulted ceiling of the prayer hall

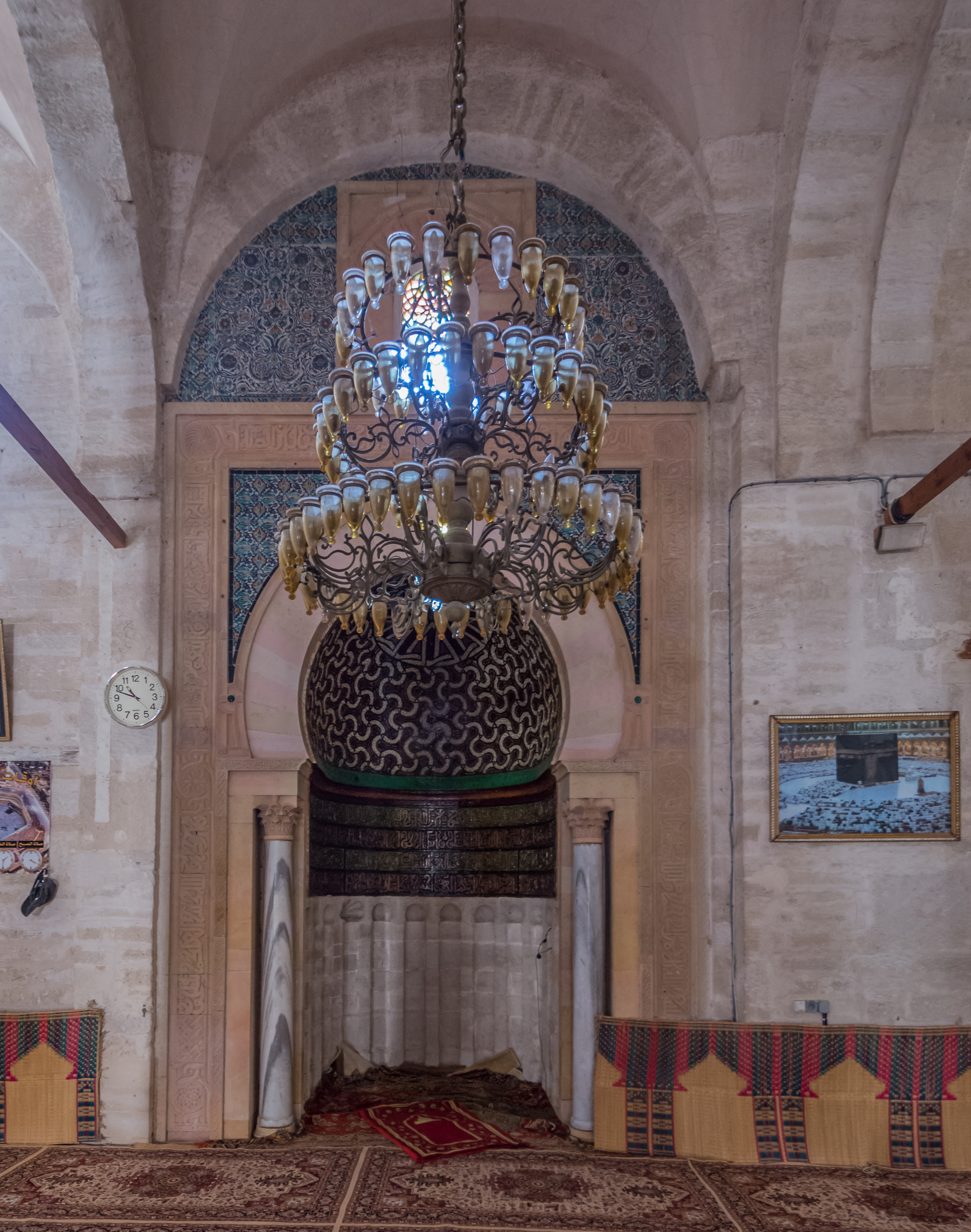
The central mihrab of the mosque (18th century)

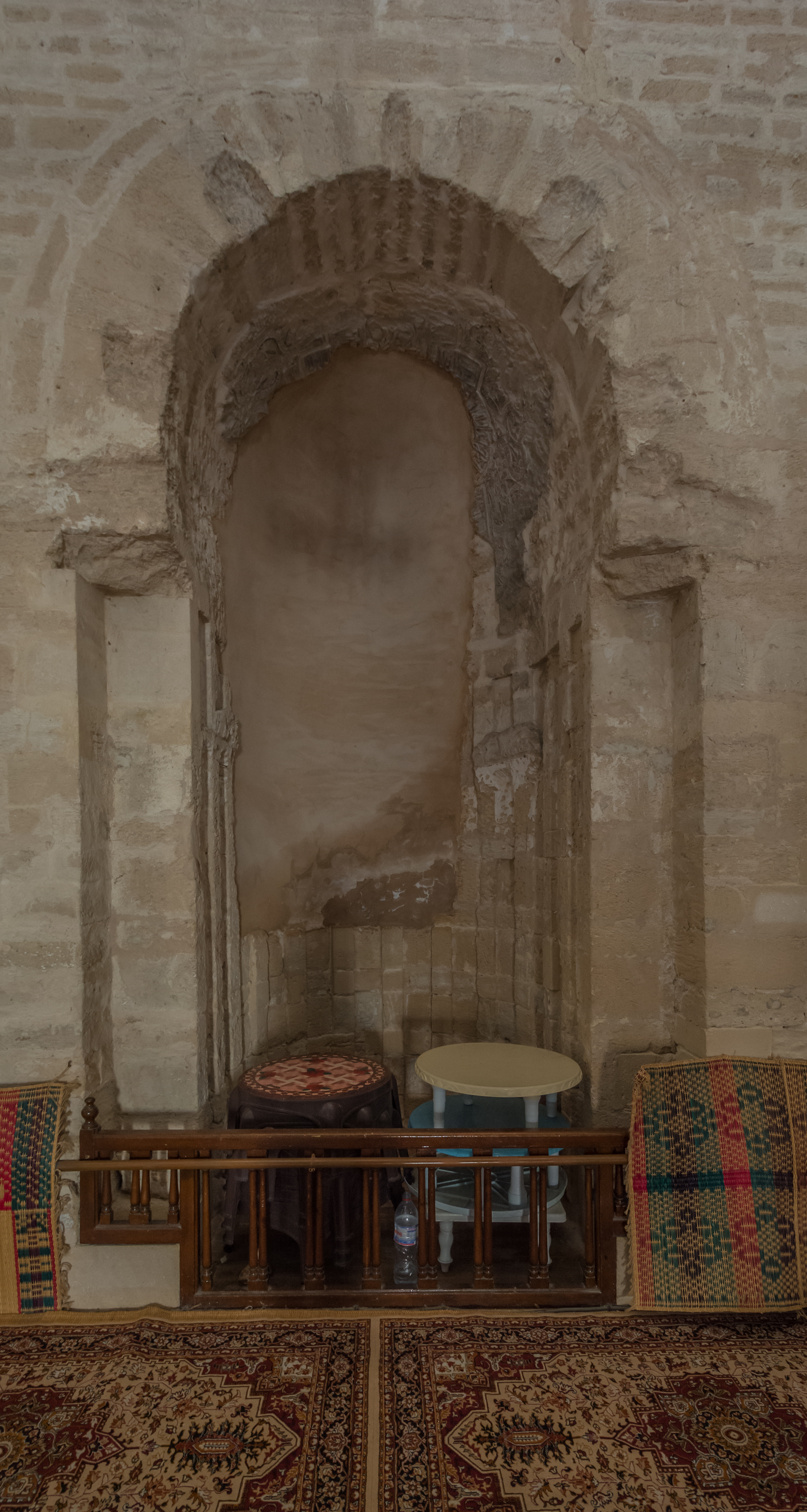
The former Zirid-era mihrab of the mosque (10th–12th century)

=== Courtyard ===
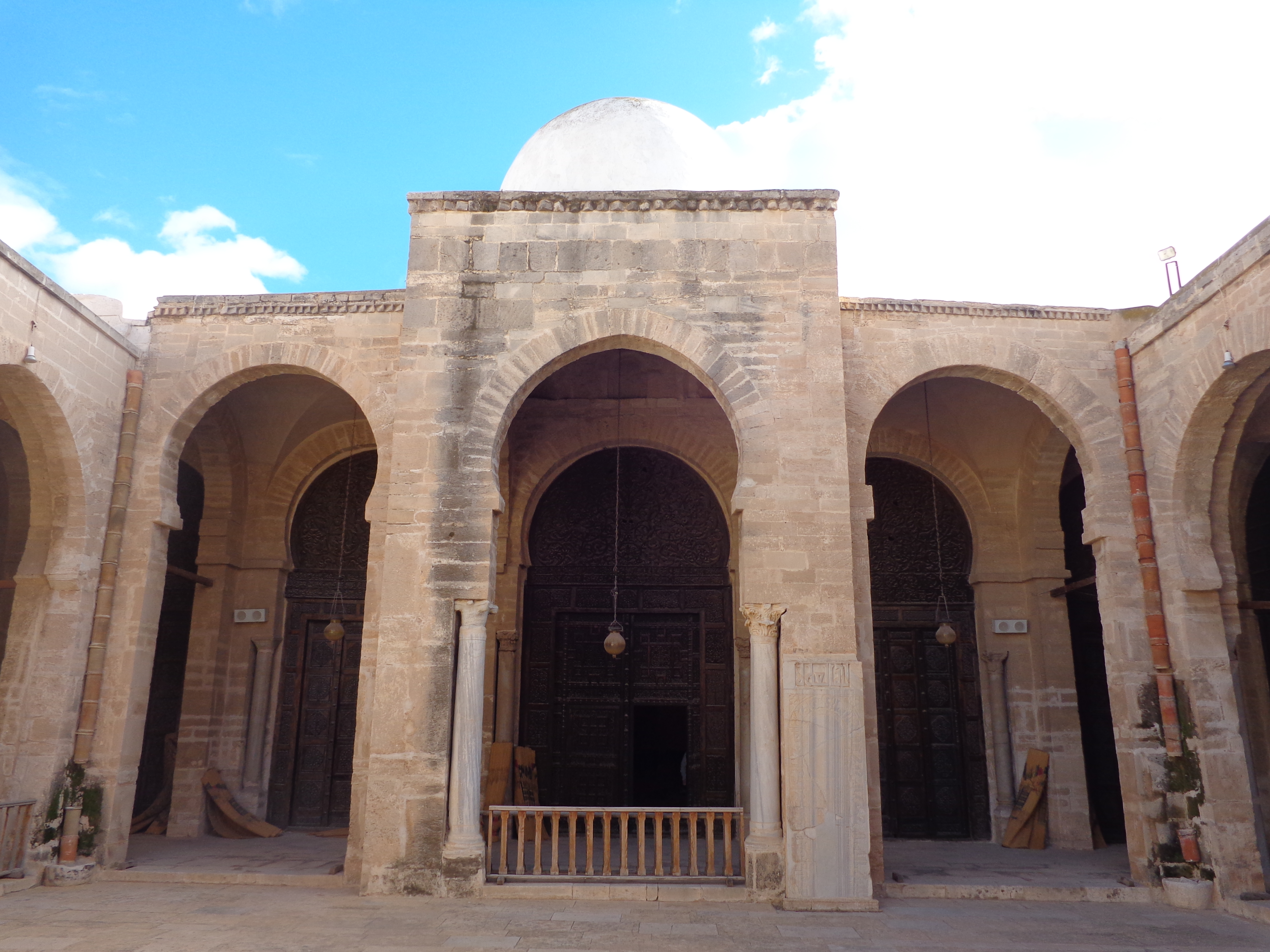
Courtyard of the mosque, looking south to the domed portico preceding the prayer hall

The courtyard is surrounded on all four sides by an arcaded gallery also covered by groin vaults. On the south side is a kind of "narthex" that leads to the prayer hall, five bays wide. Its central bay projects slightly outward into the courtyard and is covered by a dome. Unlike older Aghlabid domes, the dome does not rest on an octagonal drum. The piers supporting this dome are adjoined by columns, and the western pier facing the courtyard (on the right when looking towards the prayer hall) is partly covered by a tall marble plaque carved in the shape of an arch with Kufic inscriptions. This plaque served as a kind of outdoor mihrab for those performing prayers in the courtyard, similar to an anaza. It has been attributed to the Fatimid period (10th century) based on the style of the Kufic script. The wooden doors that grant entry from the narthex to the prayer hall were crafted by a master carpenter named Ahmed Sha'abuni. They ornately carved with geometric and vegetal motifs and were originally painted with colours.

=== Minaret ===
The minaret, a thick cuboid tower built in the Zirid period around the original Aghlabid minaret, rises from the corner of the courtyard, near the middle of the mosque's northern edge. The original minaret also had a square base but it measured only 4.2 metres per side and it rose to a possible height of 20 metres. The present minaret is quite different from contemporary minarets of the Fatimid-Zirid period and its shape evokes instead the 9th-century minaret of the Great Mosque of Kairouan. It is roughly 25 metres tall. Like the latter, it is composed of three tiers. The first tier, the largest, is three stories tall and is pierced by a door on the ground floor and a window on each of the floors above. The windows have mixtilinear shapes (a mix of straight and curved lines). The top of the shaft is crowned by several horizontal bands of decoration: a cornice of triangular dentils, a frieze of recessed circles, an elegant Kufic inscription frieze, and, at the top, a line of ornate pierced merlons. The merlons recall a similar form of decoration found in the Mosque of Ibn Tulun and in Fatimid mosques in Cairo. This decoration is repeated for the second tier of the minaret, which rises one story. The last tier at the summit is a thin lantern-like structure open on four sides, with engaged colonettes at its corners, and topped by a dome.

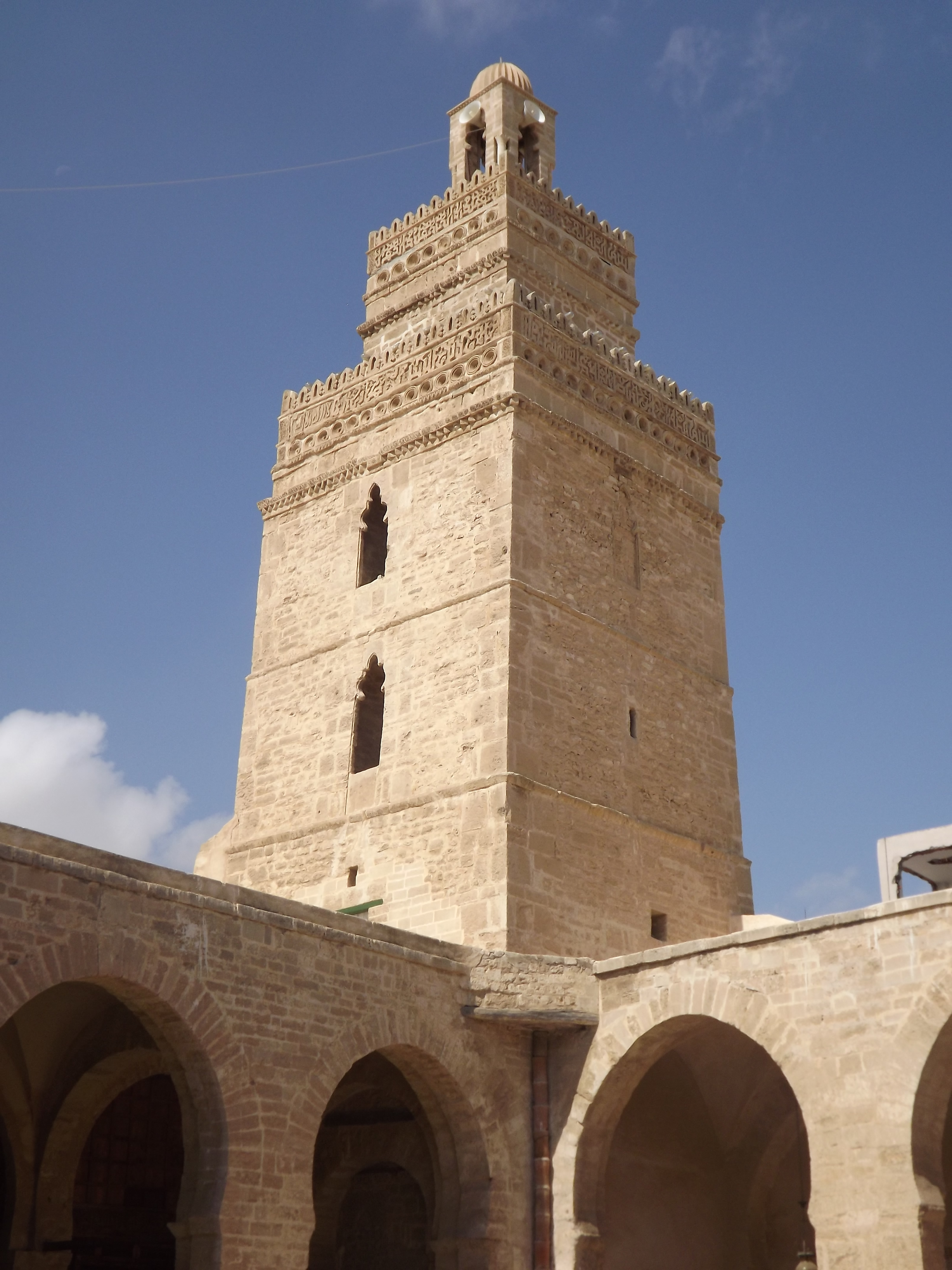
The minaret, seen from the courtyard

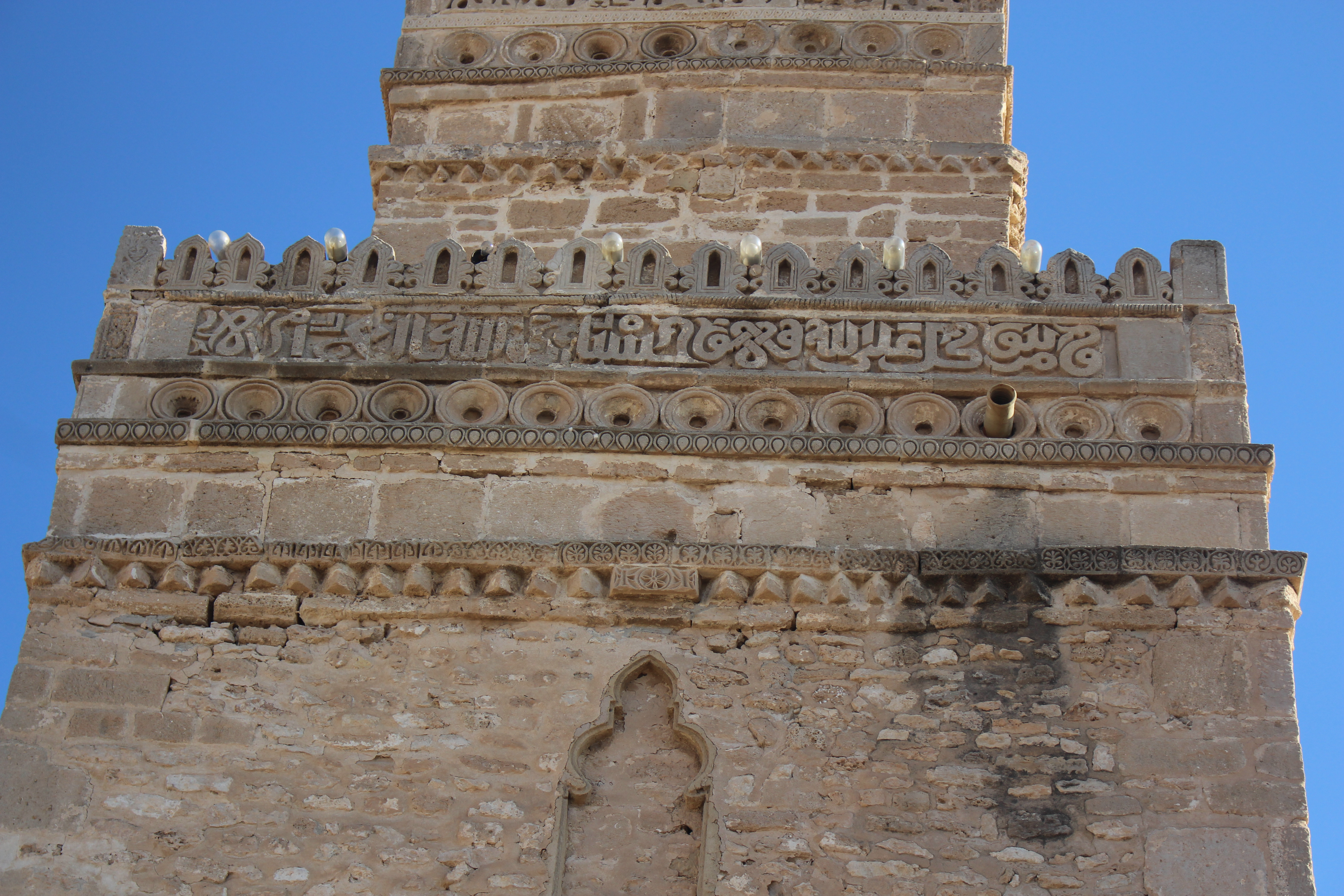
Detail of decoration of the minaret's first tier

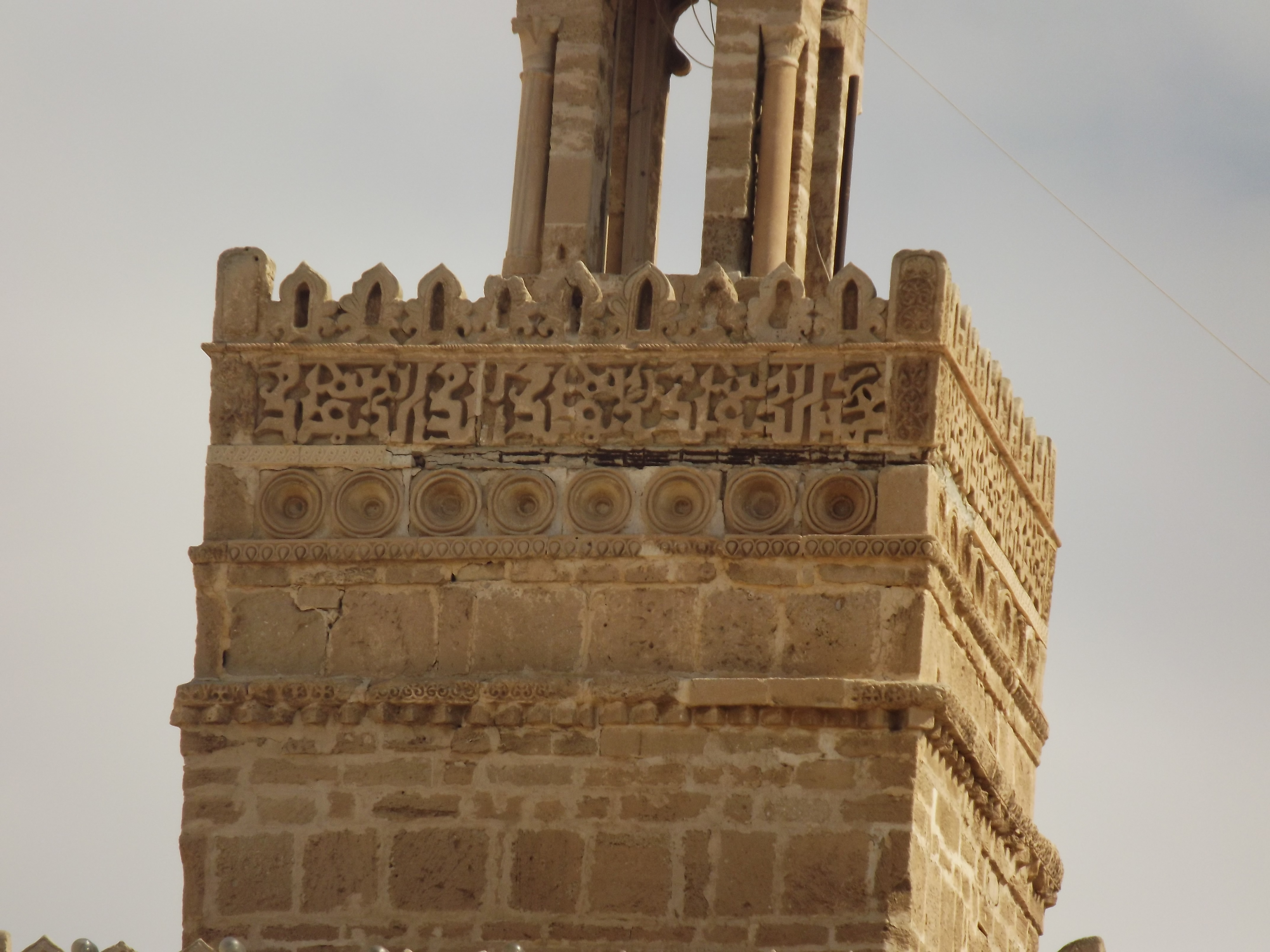
Detail of decoration around the top of the minaret

=== Eastern façade ===
The exceptional eastern exterior façade of the mosque is embellished with a series of decorative horseshoe arch-shaped niches or recesses above the doors and windows. Some of them contain Arabic inscriptions. This façade may be from the original 9th-century mosque but its unique and unusual appearance may date it to a later period. Multiple scholars attribute it to the Zirid period, including Lucien Golvin and Georges Marçais. In addition to the overall composition, another unusual feature is the reuse of a Byzantine marble panel with Christian votive themes set into the wall above one of the windows. The panel is carved with an image of two peacocks facing each other (partly erased by chisel at some unknown date) against a background of foliate motifs and with a Greek inscription above. The incomplete inscription appears to have been part of an invocation of God, Christ, or the Virgin Mary. This incorporation of a Christian work of art with figural motifs so clearly on a mosque is difficult to explain, but may have been possible due to Fatimid tolerance of unorthodox expressions or due to the existence of local patrons of Byzantine ancestry who chose to reuse this panel. As the inscription no longer names the Christian figure to which it was dedicated, it may have been compatible with a general religious message for the mosque.

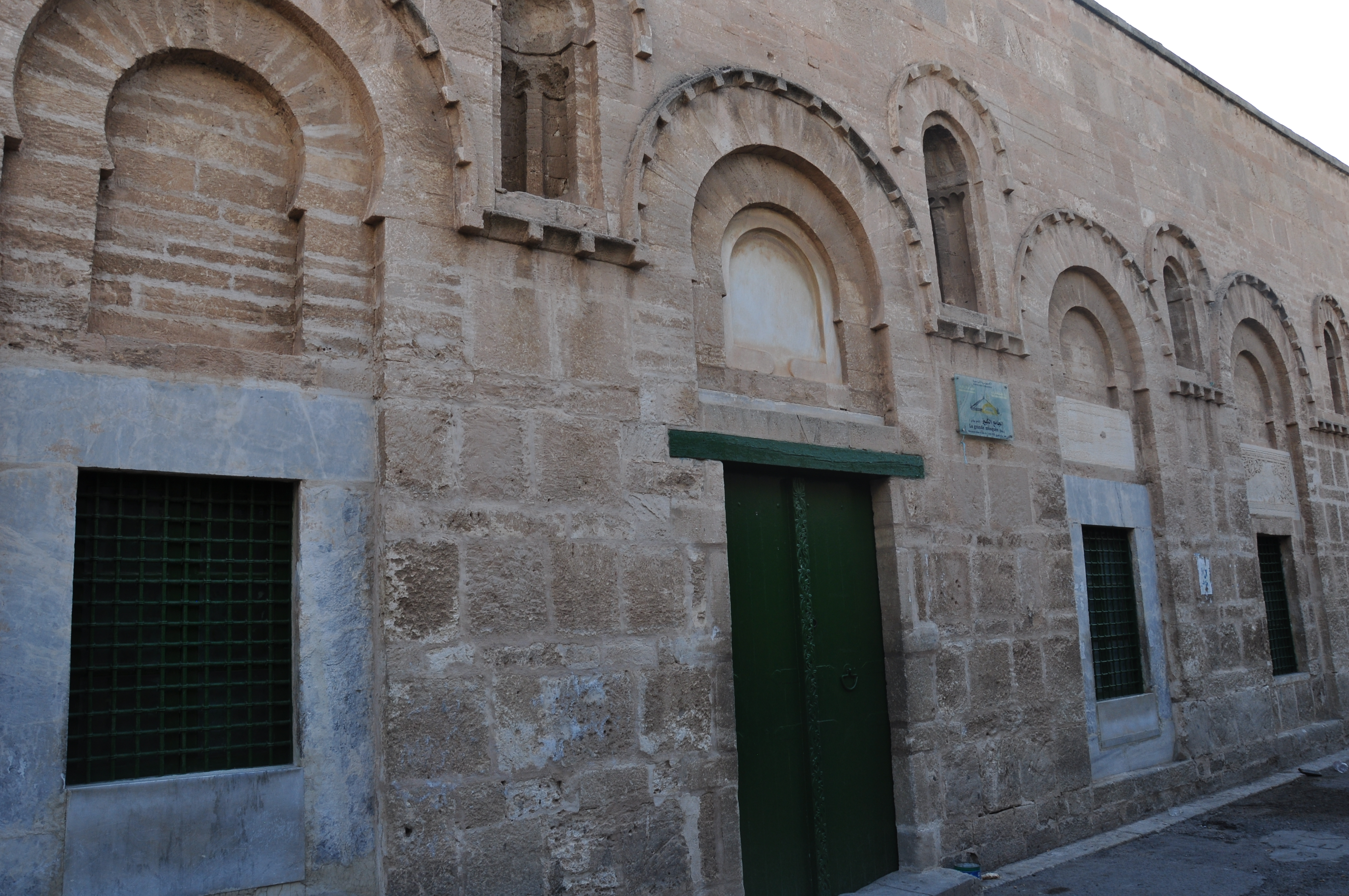
The exterior eastern façade of the mosque

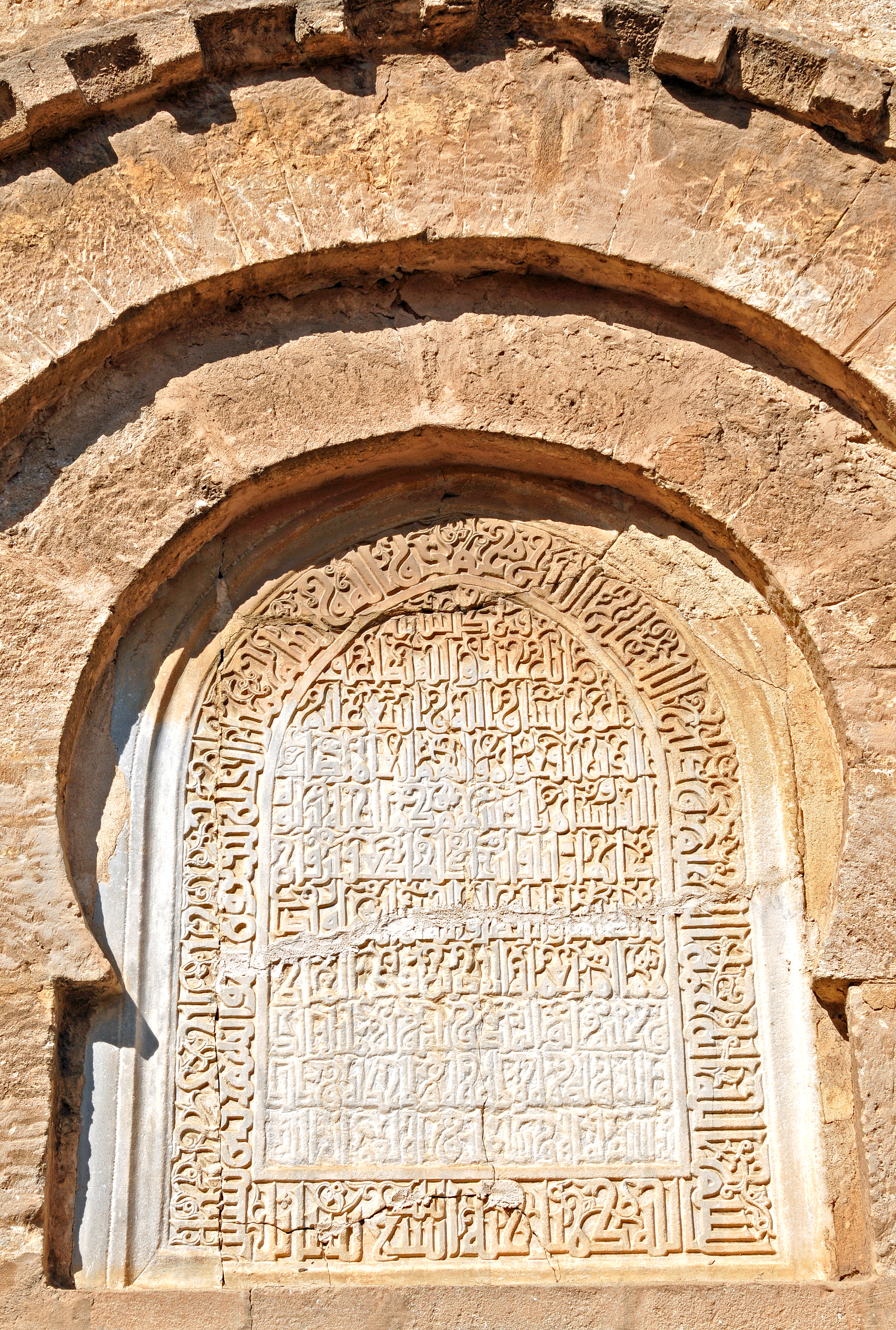
Inscription plaque in one of the recessed arches

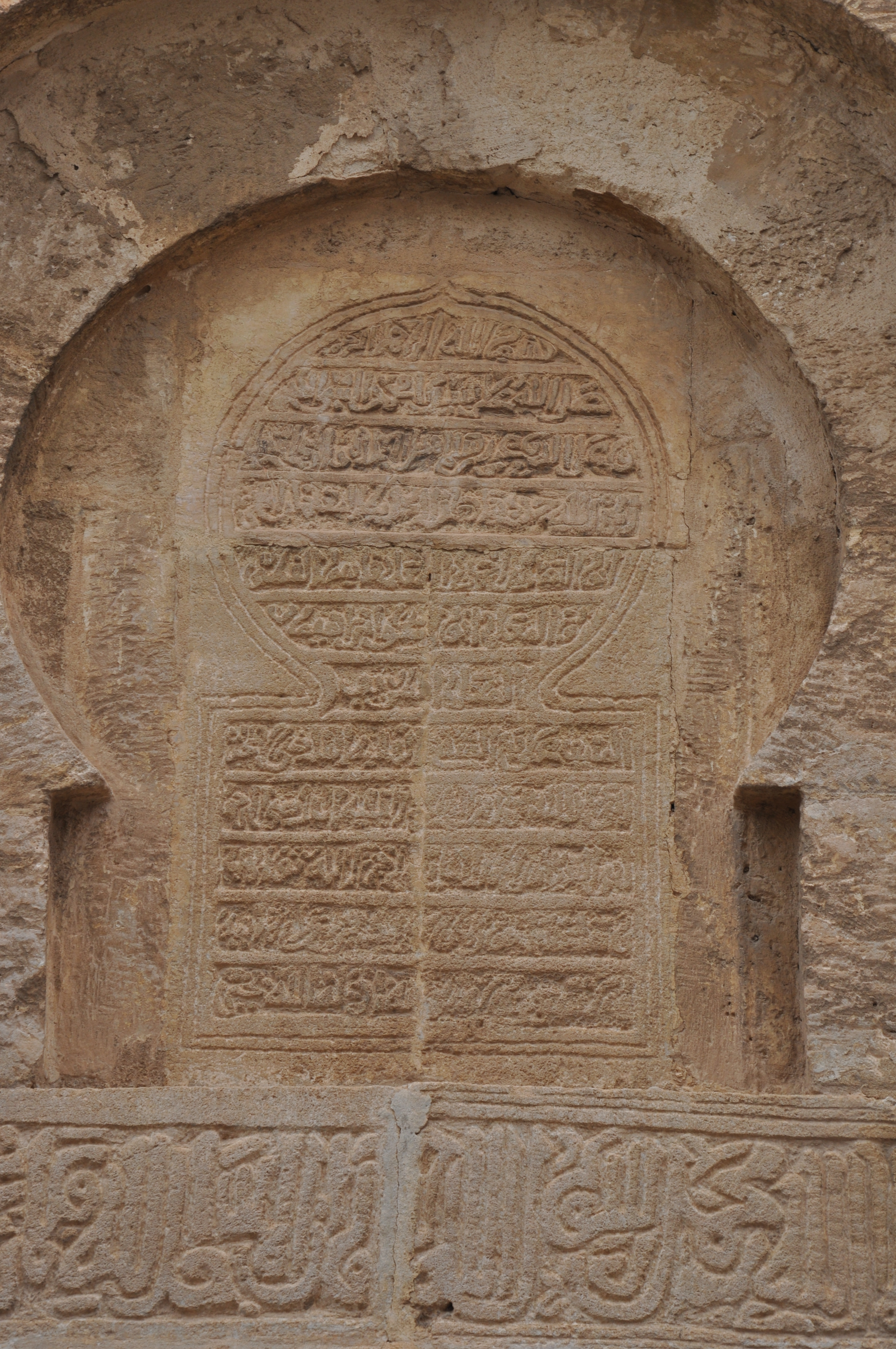
Another inscription on the façade

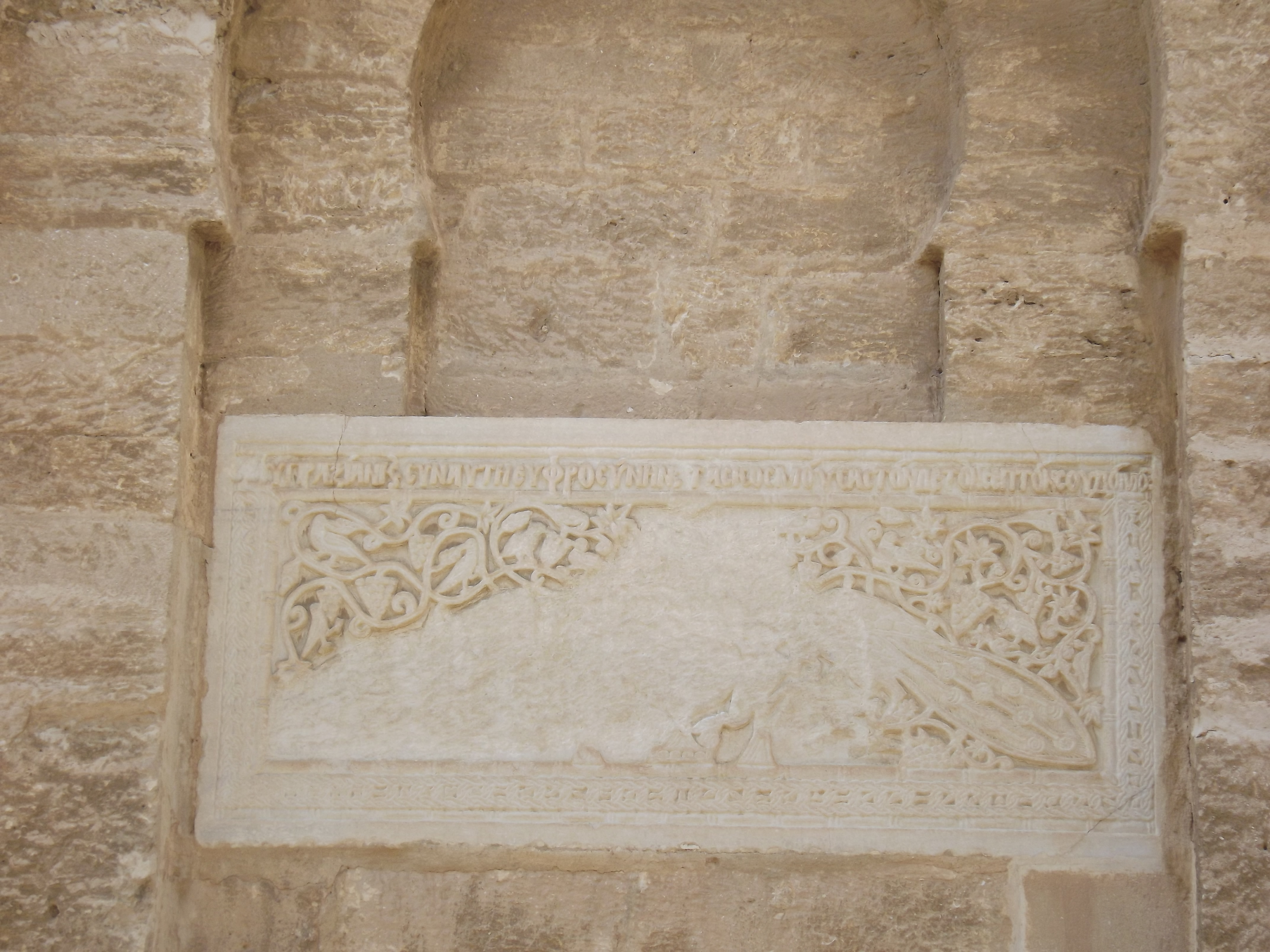
Byzantine marble panel in the eastern façade

== See also ==
- List of the oldest mosques
- Early medieval domes
