= Souk El Kebabjia =

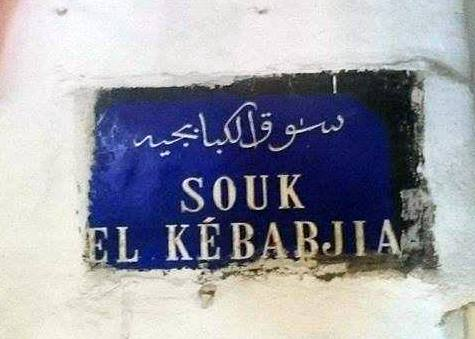
Metallic sign indicating Souk El Kebabjia

Souk El Kebabjia (Arabic: سوق الكبابجية) is one of the souks of the medina of Tunis. It is specialized in the trading of traditional clothing accessories. Its craftsmen are specialized in kbaïeb, plural kobba (silk and cotton yarns).

== Location ==
It is situated west of Al-Zaytuna Mosque, in parallel to Souk El Berka and close to Souk El Trouk from one end and to Souk Es Sekajine from the other end.

== History ==
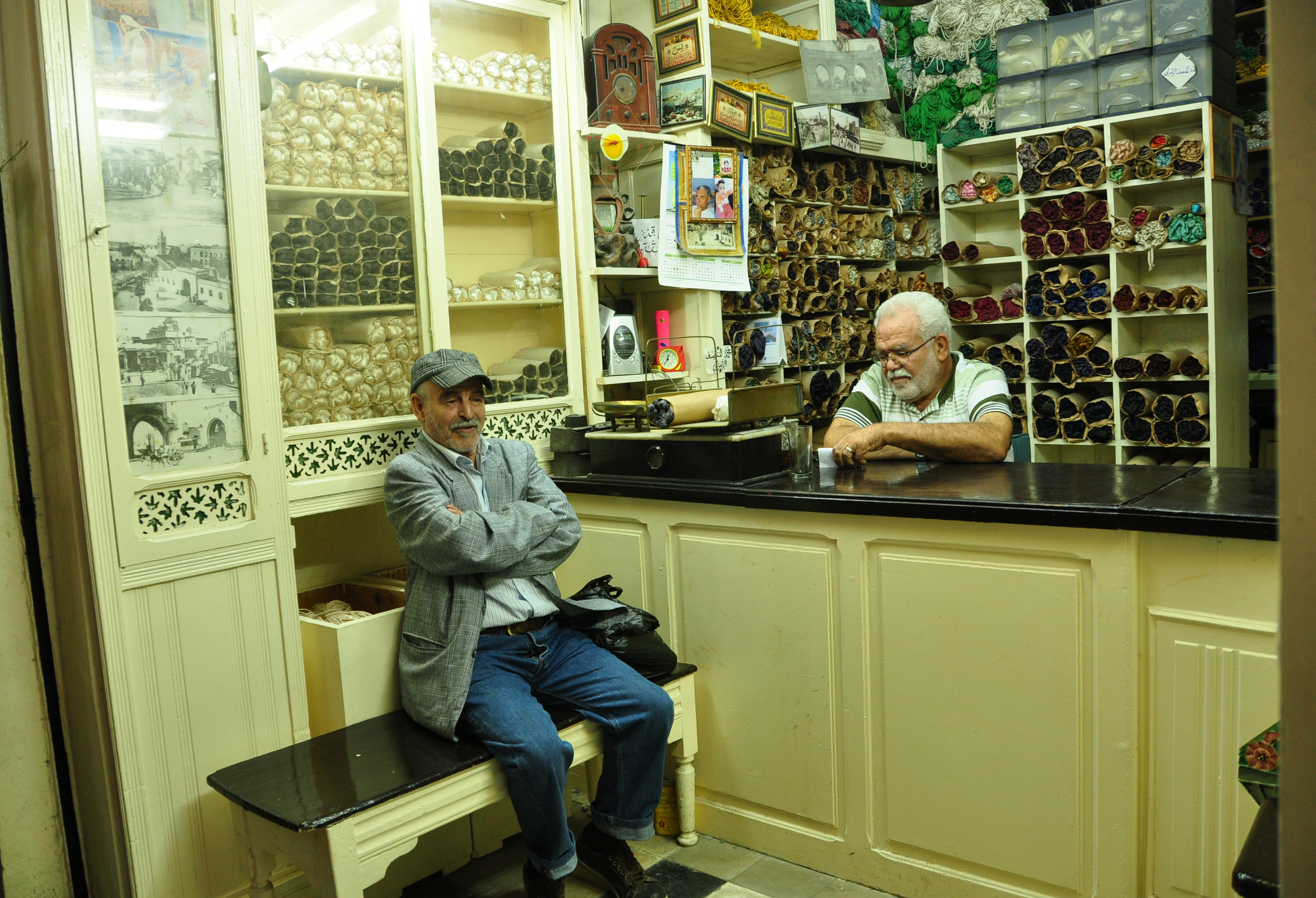
Kebabji (kobba seller) shop at the souk

The souk was constructed at the same time as Souk El Trouk by Yusuf Dey during the 17th century.

== Products ==
The souk has silk yarns for weaving traditional clothing.
