= Souk Al Asr =

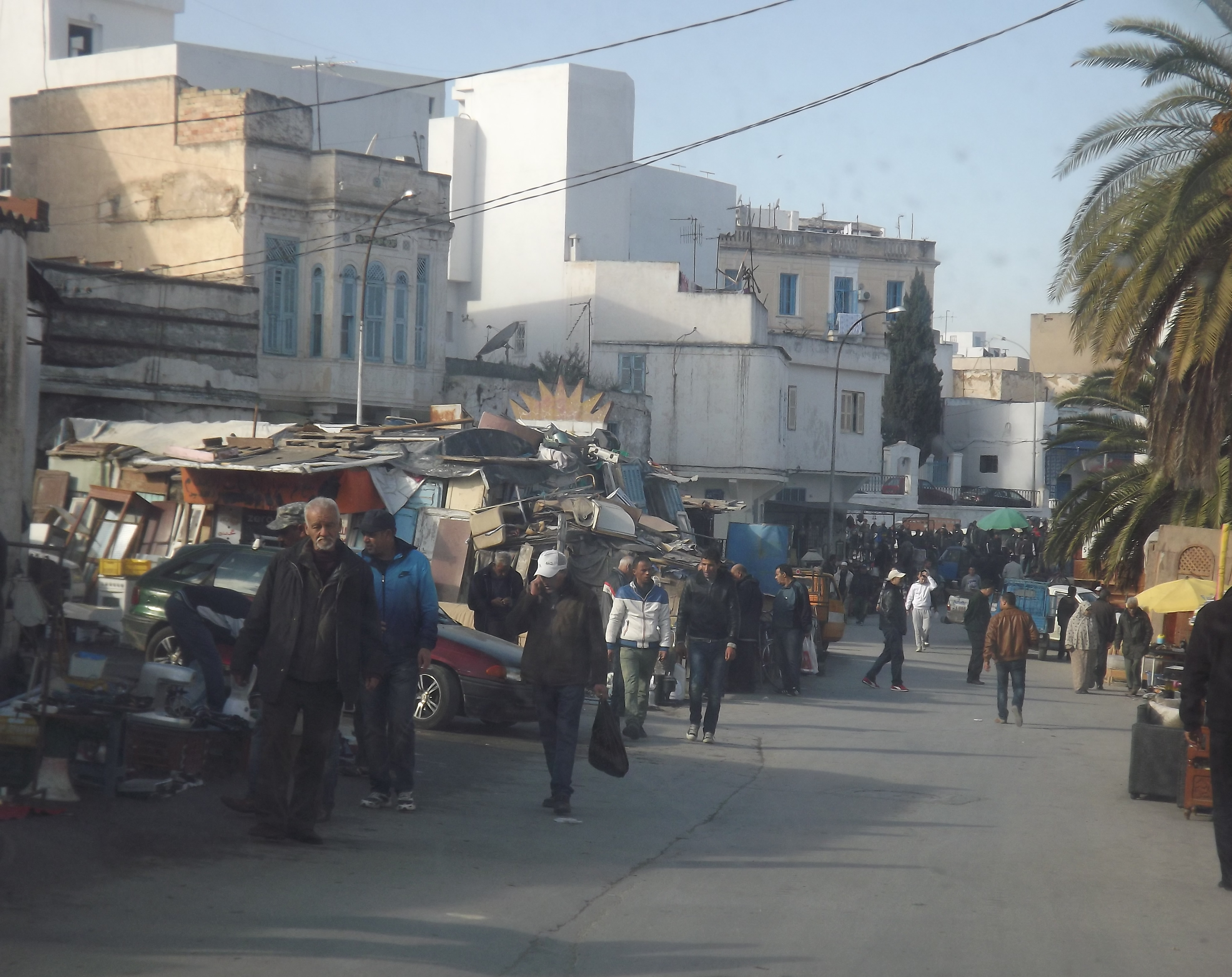
A view of souk Al Asr

Souk Al Asr (Arabic: سوق العصر; English: Era market) is one of the souks of Tunis, specialized in selling antique products. The souk is mainly intended for the middle class and poor.

== Location ==
It is located behind Bab Al Gorjani, one of the medina's doors and near three low-income neighbourhoods of Tunis, i.e. Mellassine, Saida Manoubia and Helal City.

== History ==
The souk didn't exist before the Husainid era (1705-1957), while other souks emerged under the Hafsid dynasty (1228-1537). It was a tiny souk that stood between prayers of the afternoon and the sunset (third and fourth prayers of the day).

== Products ==
Souk Al Asr is totally the opposite of its own name as it sold only old products like household utensils, antique furniture and other rare items. This market is full of items that can be particularly useful and rare, that are not likely to be found elsewhere.
