= Cheikh Rasaa Mosque =

Mosque in Tunis, Tunisia

- مسجد الشيخ الرصاع

Religion
- Affiliation: Sunni Islam

Location
- Location: Tunis, Tunisia

Architecture
- Type: Mosque

Cheikh Rasaa Mosque (Arabic: مسجد الشيخ الرصاع) is a Tunisian mosque in the north of the Medina of Tunis. It does not exist anymore.

== Localization ==
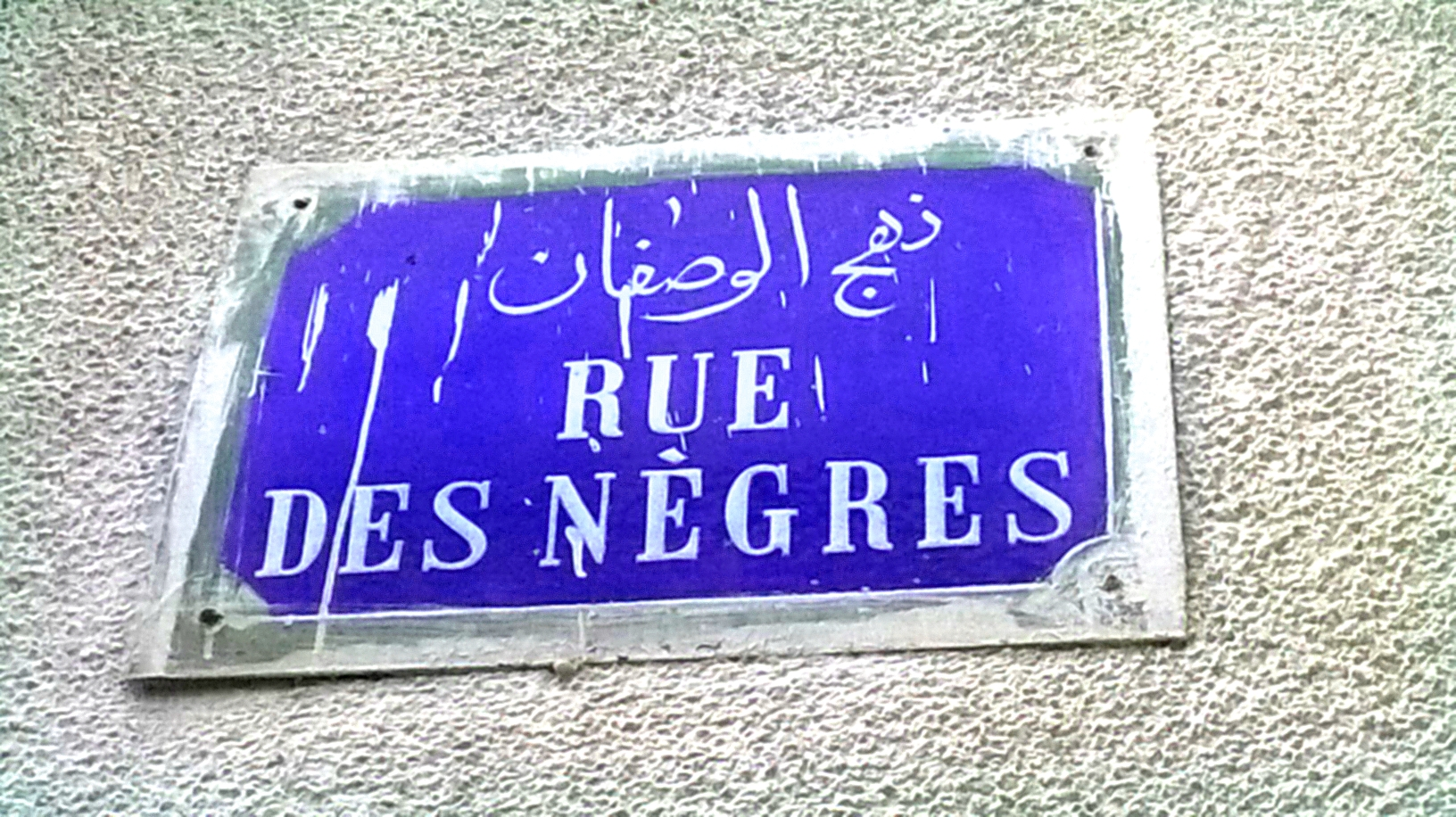
Metallic plaque of the street

The mosque was near Souk En Nhas in the Hafsia district.

== Etymology ==
It was named after the saint Cheikh Rasaa, one of the Imams of Al-Zaytuna Mosque, who died in 1489.

== History ==
The mosque was built during the Hafsid era. It has a hall and the tomb of its founder.
