= Souk Sidi Boumendil =

Coordinates: 36.794069°N 10.175890°E

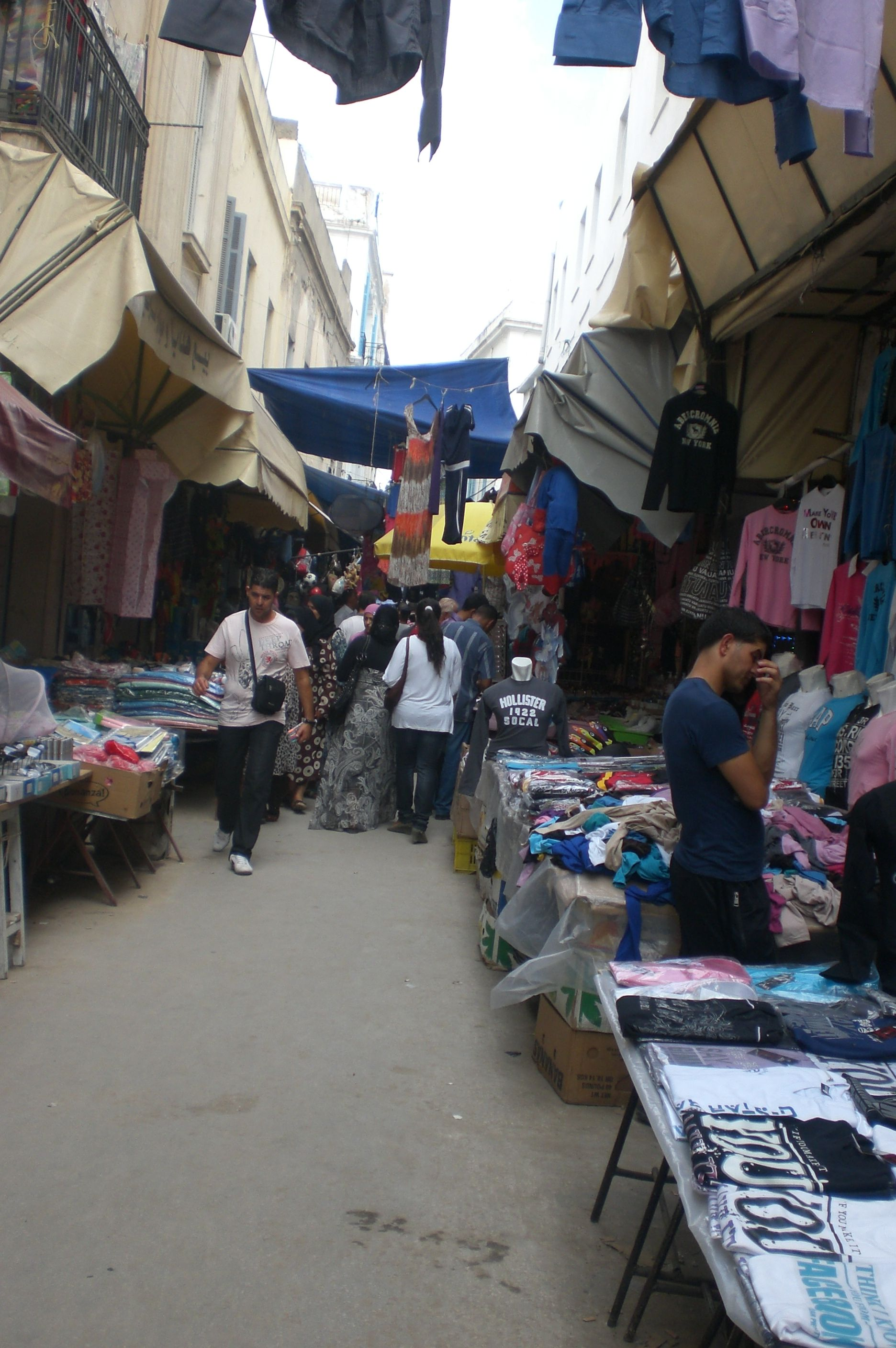
Souk Sidi Boumendil

Souk Sidi Boumendil (Arabic: سوق سيدي بومنديل) is one of the popular souks of the medina of Tunis.

== Location ==
It is located near the eastern entrance of the medina of Tunis in the Sidi Boumendil Street. It extends from Sidi El Bechir place to Spain Street and La Commission Street.

== Products ==
The souk is specialized in selling products from China and Eastern Asia. These products are known for their low quality and cheap price.

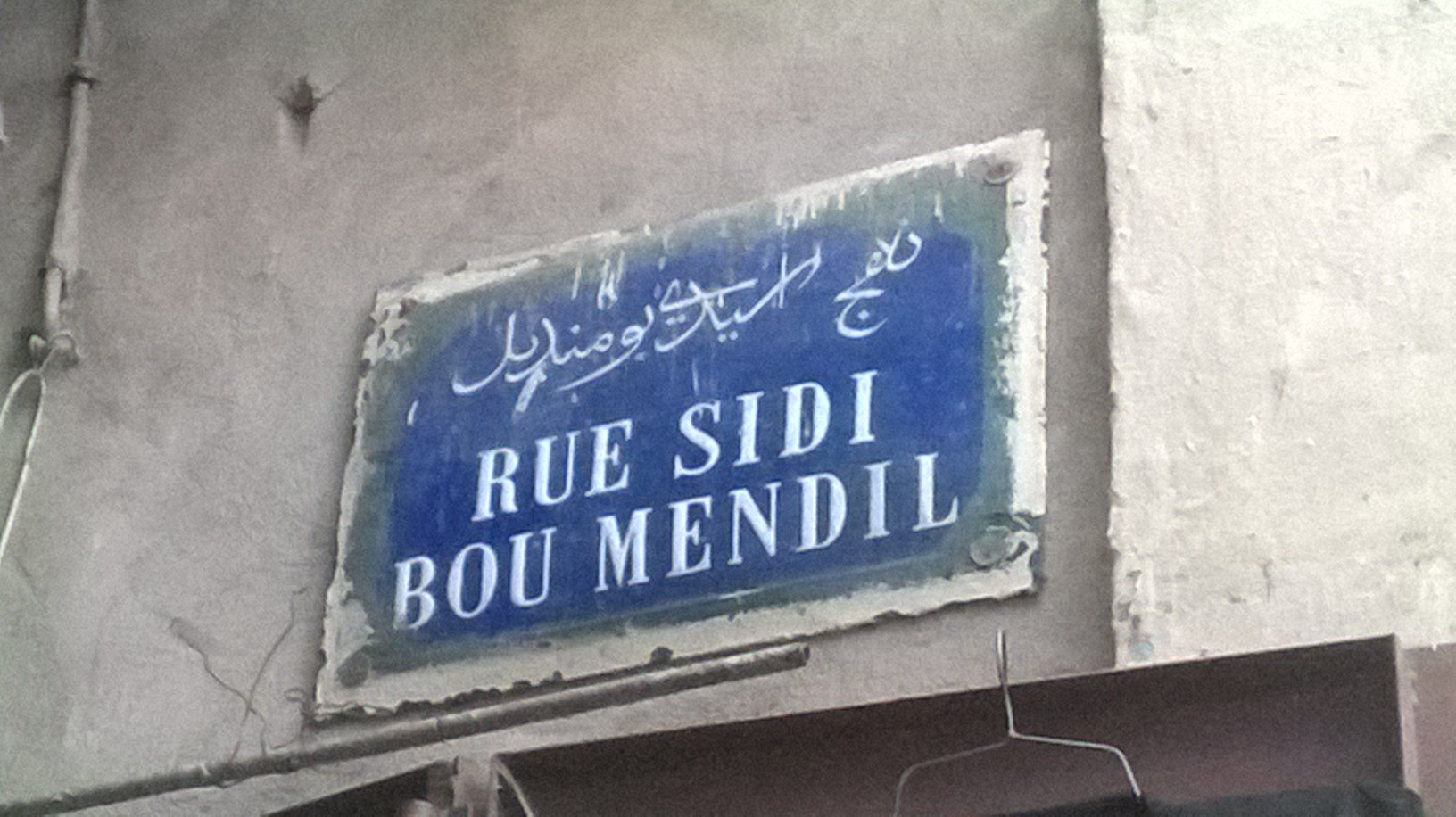
Metallic sign of Sidi Bou Mendil street

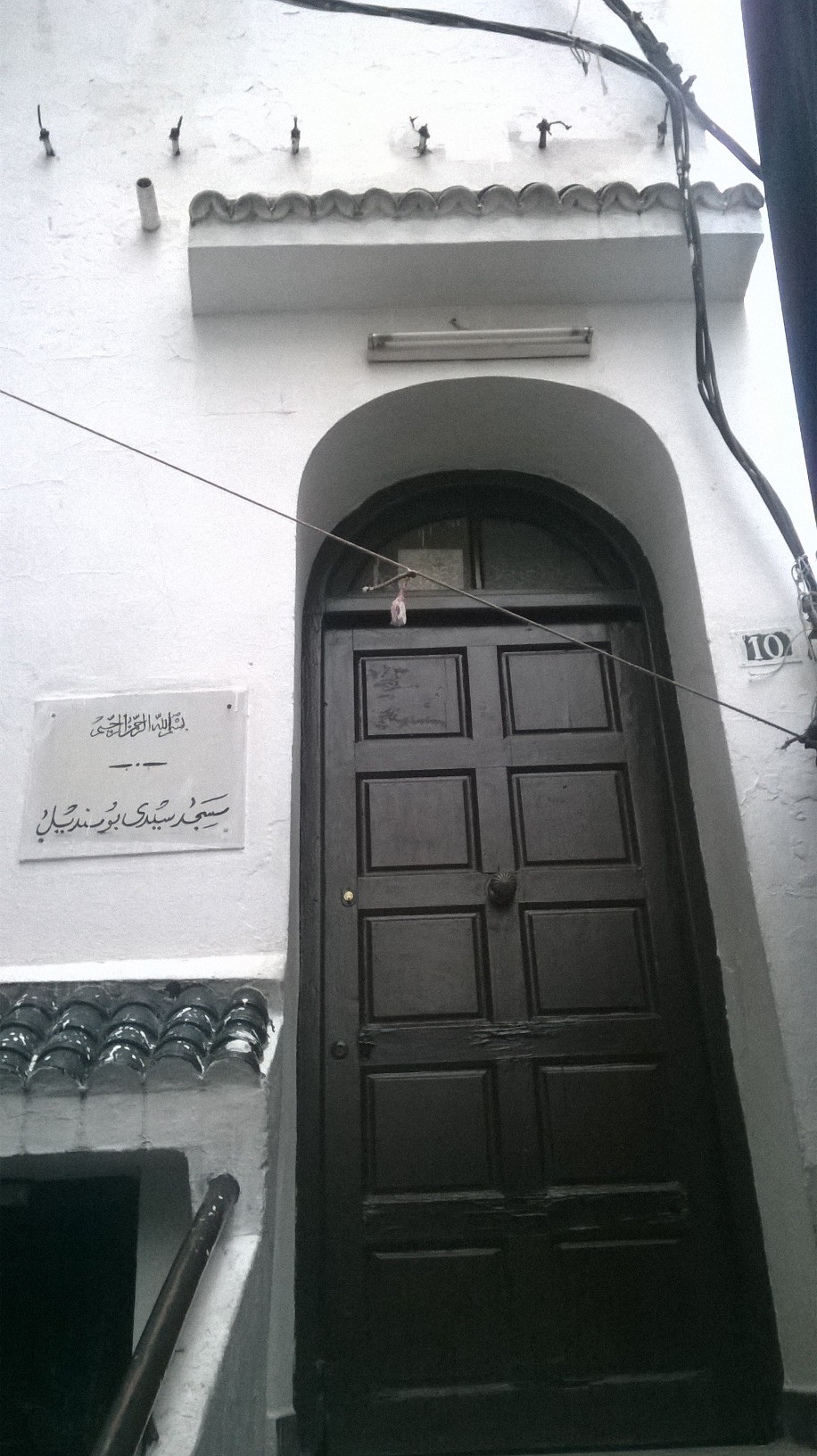
Facade of Sidi Boumendil Mosque

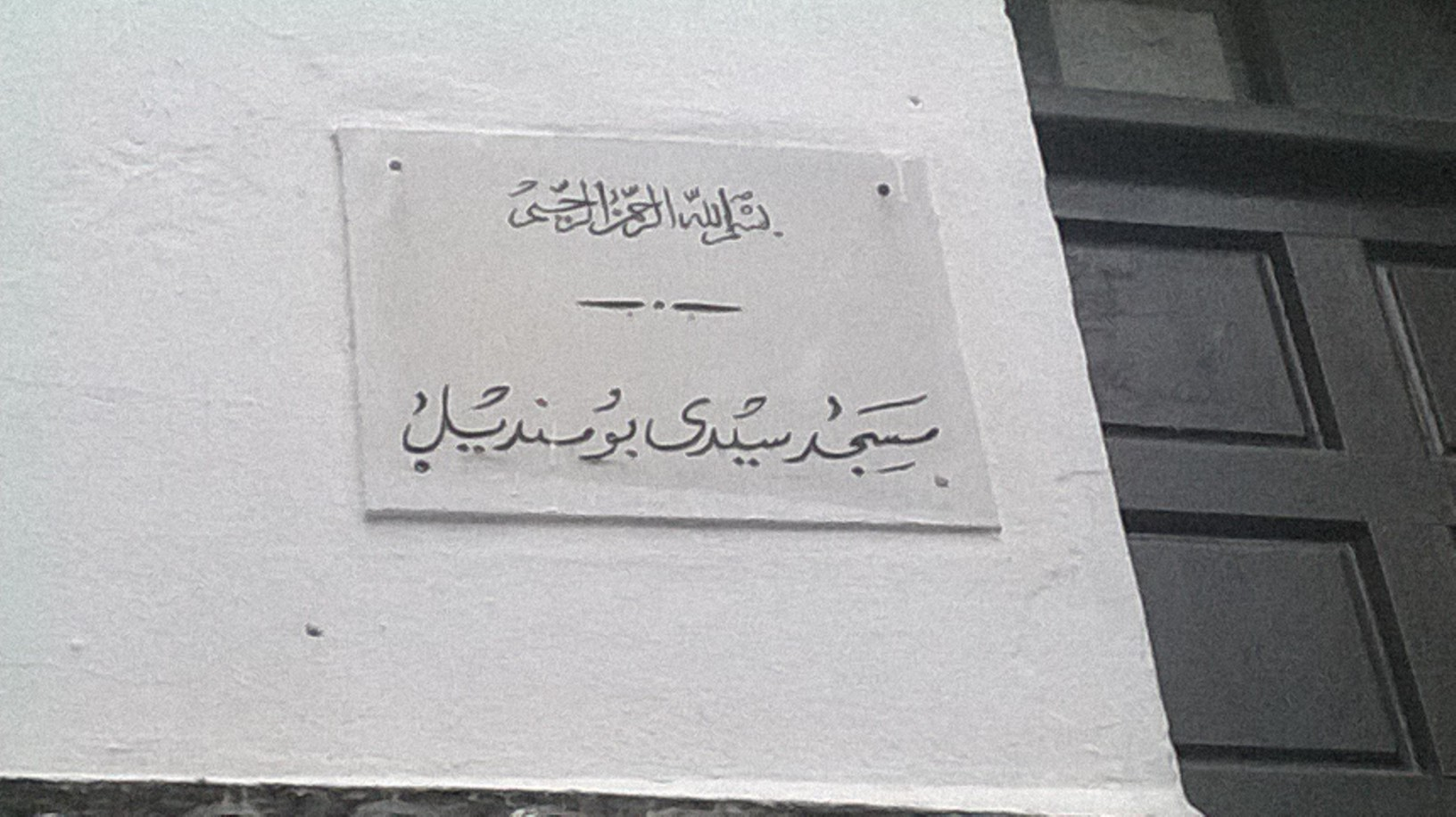
Marble sign of the Sidi Boumendil Mosque
