= Souk El Kouafi =

Coordinates: 36.796669°N 10.169901°E

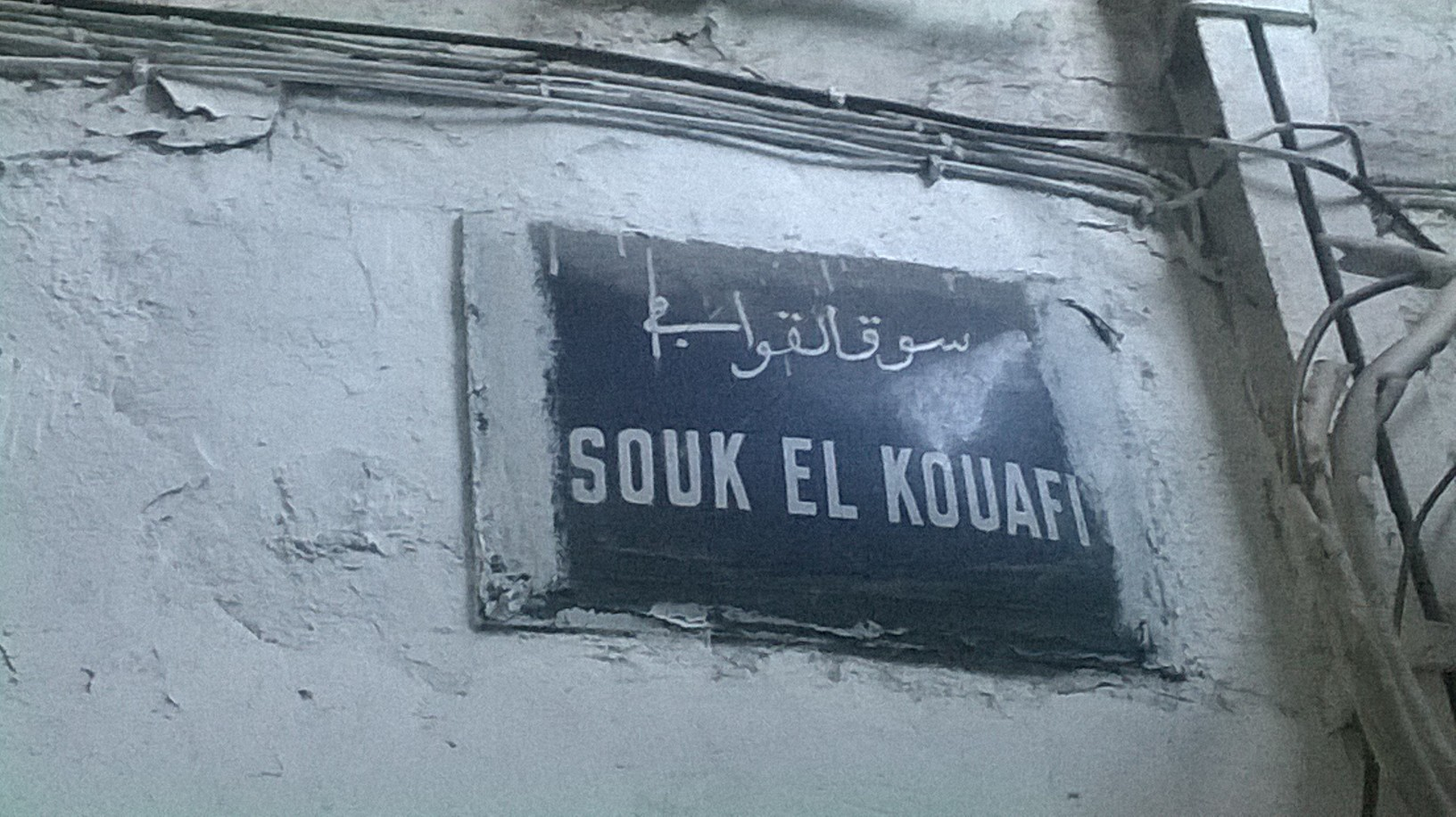
Metallic plaque of souk El Kouafi

Souk El Kouafi is one of the souks of the medina of Tunis, specialized in selling women caps.

== Location ==
It is located in the east of Al-Zaytuna Mosque.
