= El Ichbili Mosque =

Mosque in Tunis, Tunisia

- جامع الاشبيلي
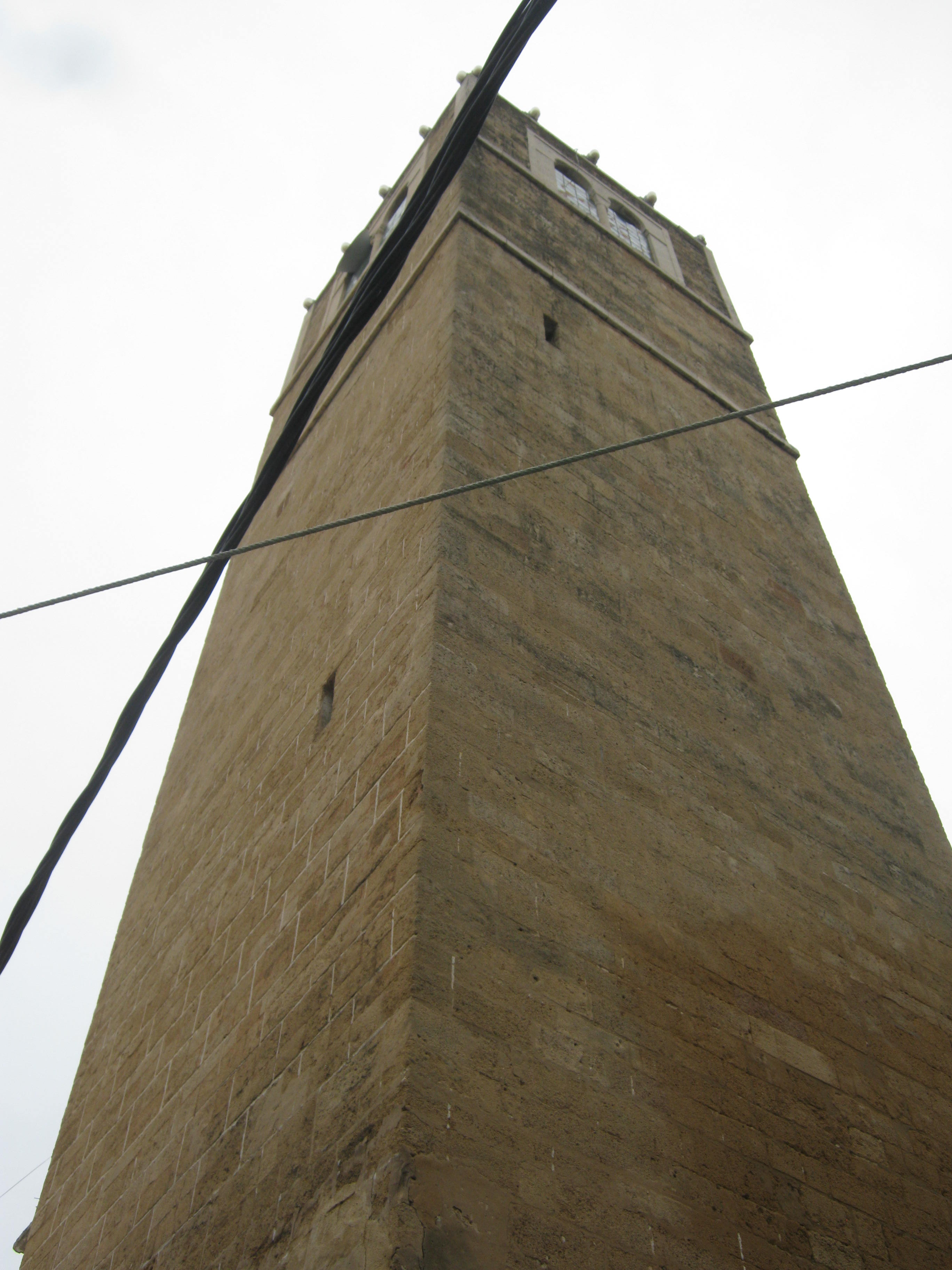

Religion
- Affiliation: Islam
- Branch/tradition: Sunni

Location
- Location: Tunis, Tunisia
- Interactive map of El Ichbili Mosque
- Coordinates: 36°47′47.2″N 10°10′22.8″E

Architecture
- Type: Mosque
- Established: 10th century

El Echbili Mosque (Arabic: جامع الاشبيلي), is a Tunisian mosque located in the medina of Tunis.

== Location ==
The mosque can be found in the intersection between the Bach Hamba Street and the Tresor Street, in front of souk El Blat.

== Description ==
The mosque was built in the 10th century. It has a large facade with three doors. The minaret was added in the 14th century
