= El Hentati Mosque =

Mosque in Tunis, Tunisia

- جامع الهنتاتي
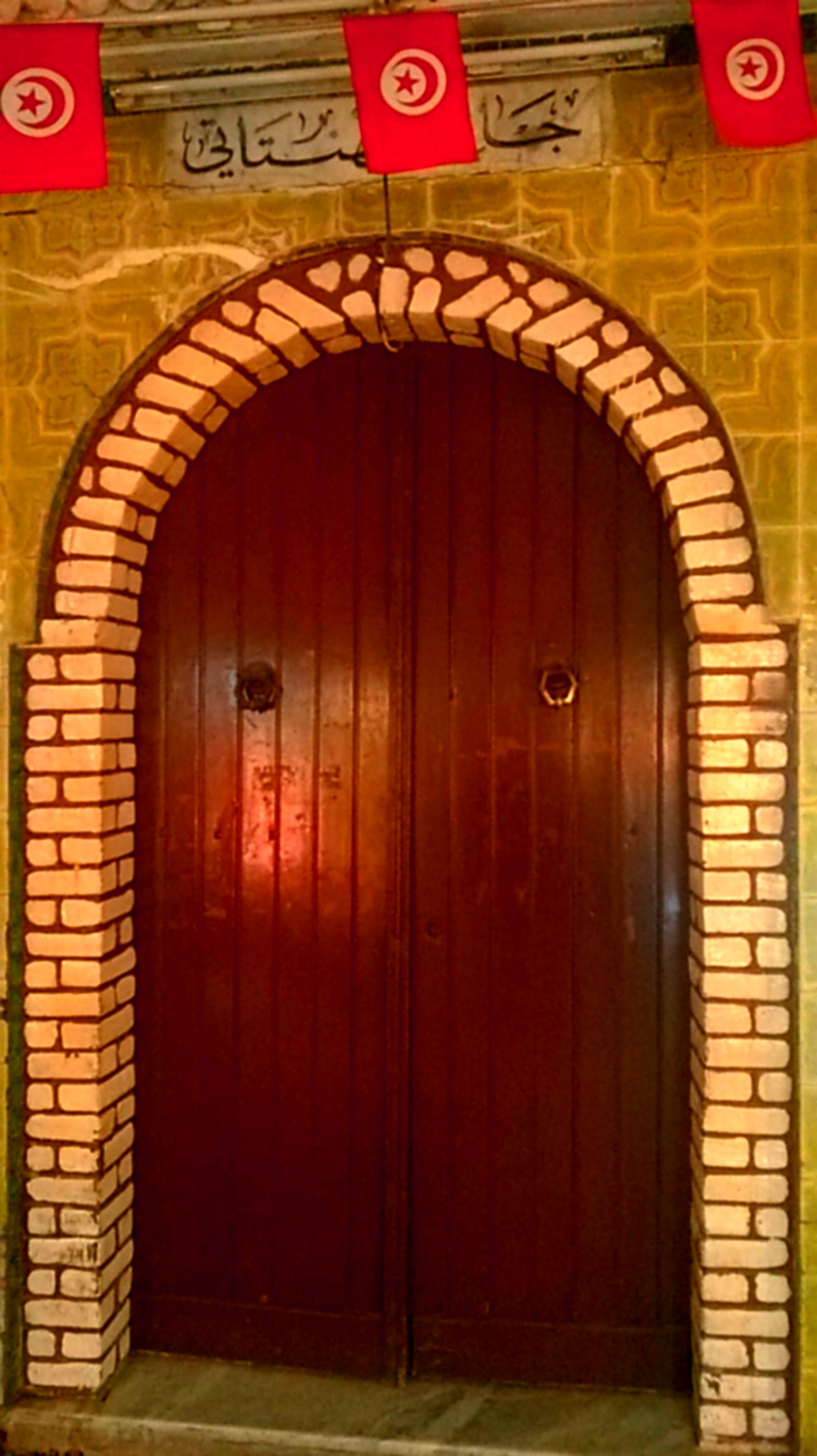

- Location within Tunisia

Religion
- Affiliation: Islam
- Branch/tradition: Ibadism

Location
- Location: Tunis, Tunisia
- Coordinates: 36.796454°N 10.169884°E

Architecture
- Type: Mosque

El Hentati Mosque (Arabic: جامع الهنتاتي) is a small mosque in the west of the medina of Tunis, in souk El Leffa.

== Localization ==
It is located in 88 Souk El Leffa.

== History ==
The mosque was built during the Hafsid era, in which Ibadi was spread in Tunis. Nowadays, Ibadi can be found mainly in Djerba.

== Etymology ==
According to Ibn Khaldoun, the name Hentati comes from the Hintata tribe led by Abu Hafs Umar ibn Yahia El Hintati (Arabic: أبو حفص عمر بن يحيى الهنتاتي), the first emir of Ifriqiya and the Hafsid dynasty.
