= Souk de la Commission =

Souk of Tunis

Coordinates: 36.798270°N 10.175232°E

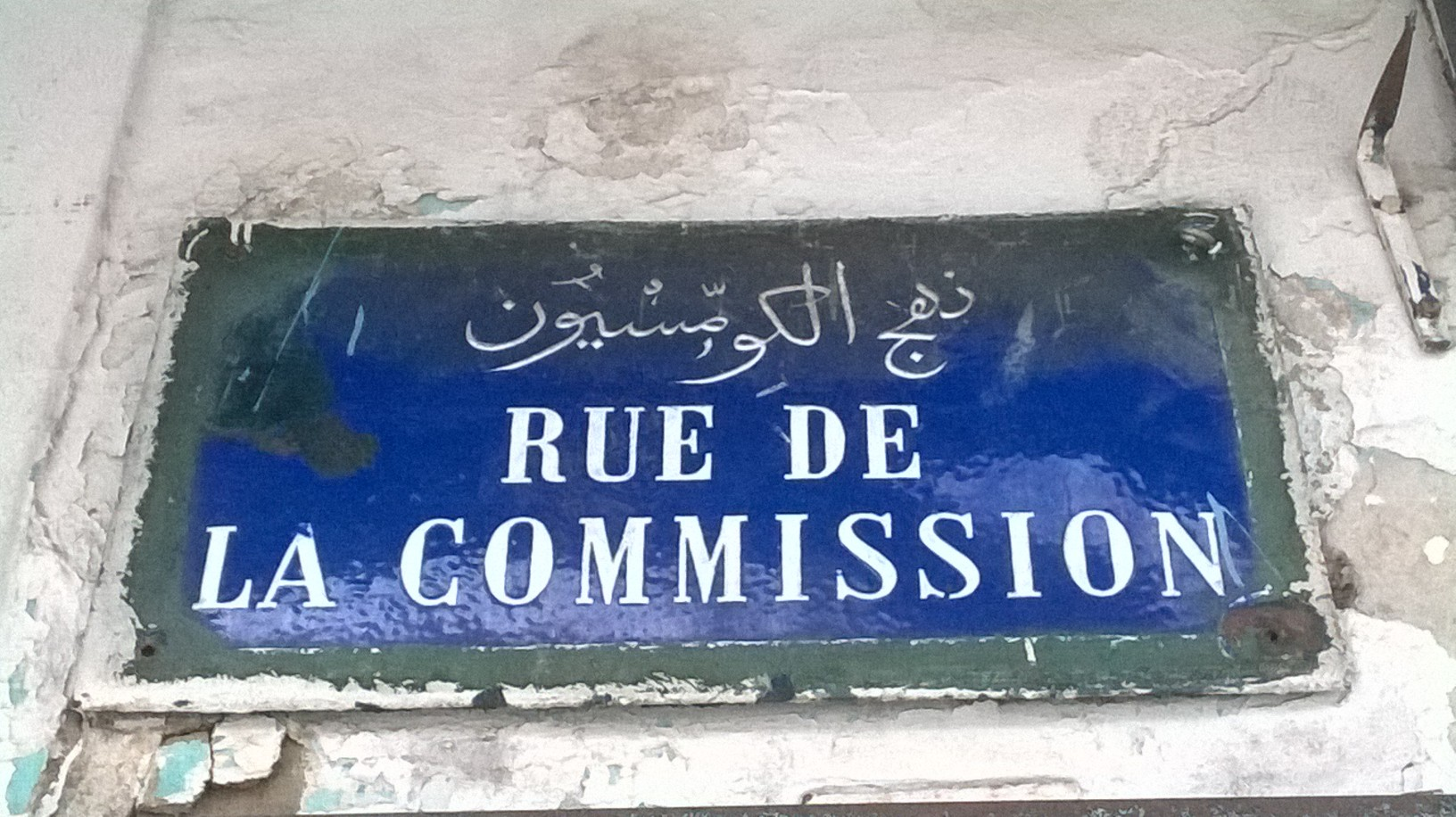
Metallic plaque of the Commission Street

Souk De la Commission (Arabic: سوق الكومسيون) is one of the souks of the medina of Tunis.

== Etymology ==
The souk got its name from the International Finance Committee headquarters in 1869, which was in charge of managing the debt of the Tunisian regency before the French occupation in 1881.

== Location ==
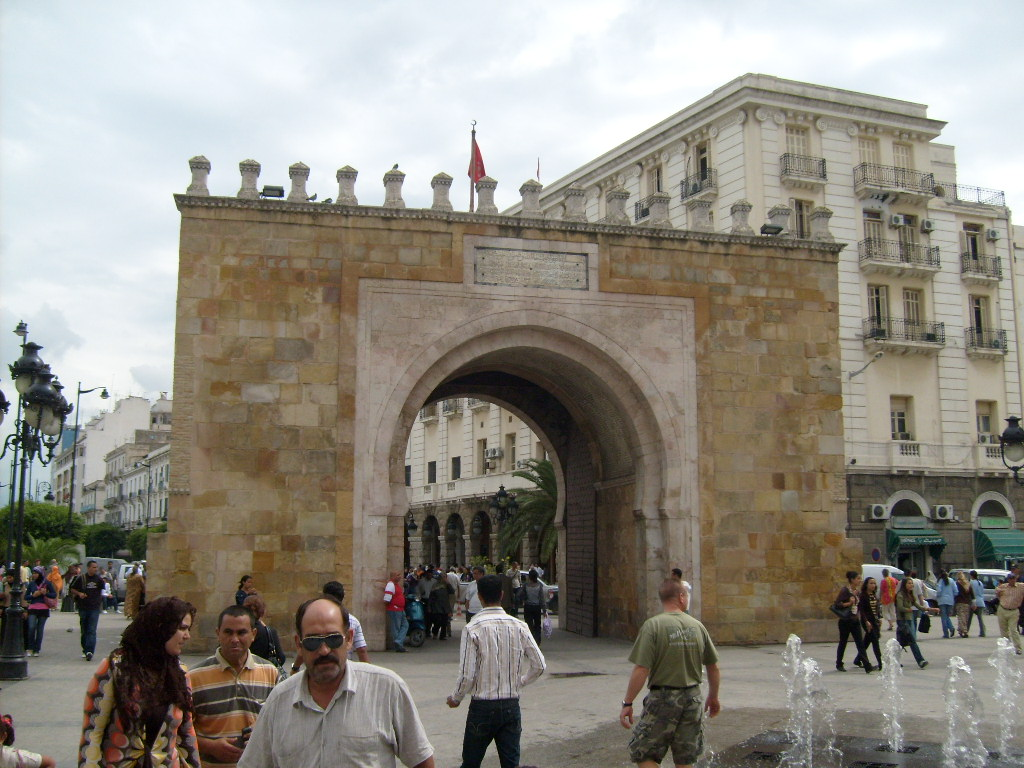
Bab Bhar and the victory square

The souk can be reached from Souk Sidi Boumendil. It leads to the victory square where Bab Bhar (one of the gates of the medina) is located.

== Products ==
It is specialized in selling products imported from China and eastern Asia.
