= Souk El Azzafine =

Coordinates: 36.799475°N 10.171278°E

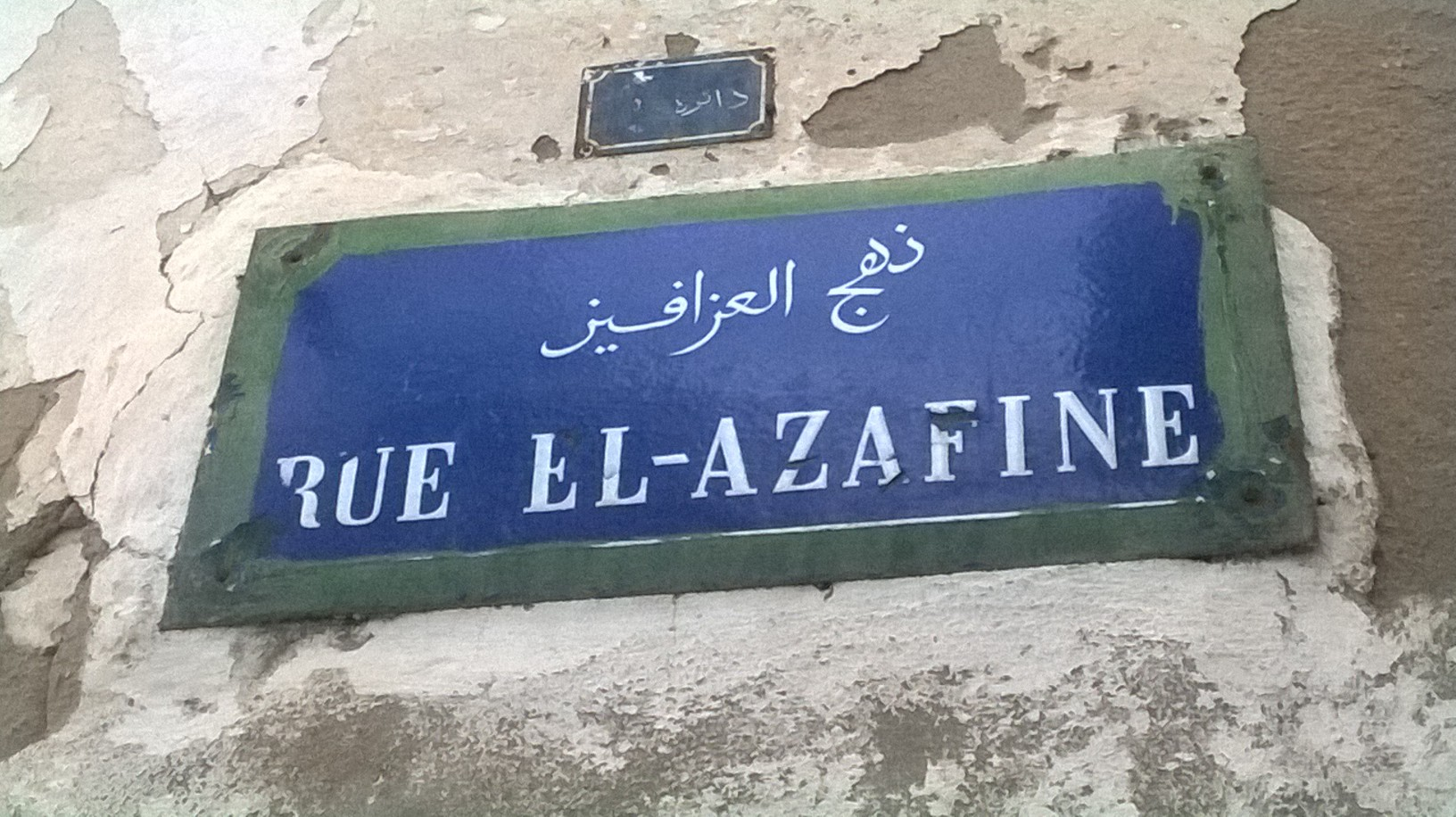
Metallic plaque of El Azzafine Street

Souk El Azzafine is one of the souks of the medina of Tunis and where the musicians used to meet.

== Etymology ==
It got its name from the Arabic word azzafa that means « music playing ».

== Monument ==
Bimaristan Al Azzafine, which is a hospital that was built during the reign of Hammuda Pasha in 1662, is located in this Souk.
