= Souk El Fekka =

Coordinates: 36.797628°N 10.171707°E

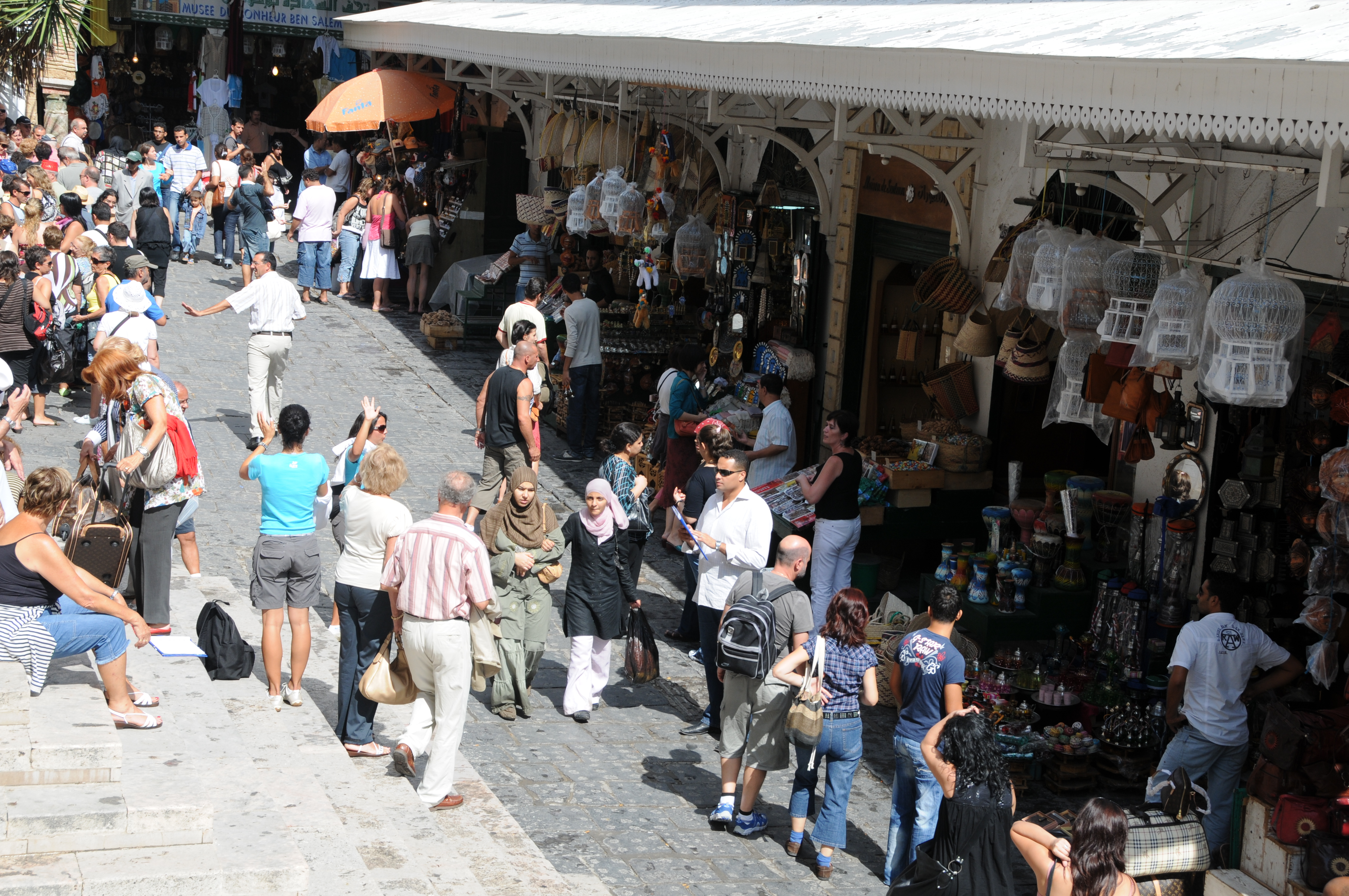
View of souk El Fekka.

Souk El Fekka is one of the souks of the medina of Tunis.

== Location ==
It is directly located in front of the Ez-Zituna Mosque, near Souk El Attarine.

== Products ==
It is possible to buy ingredients for the preparation of cakes present at every celebrations, such as birth, circumcision, marriage or Eid al-Fitr, which marks the end of the month of Ramadan. Almonds, as well as walnuts, pistachios and raisins are available in baskets, whereas bottles of almond or pistachio syrups, called rouzata from the Spanish word orchata, are aligned on the shelves.
