= Souk El Leffa =

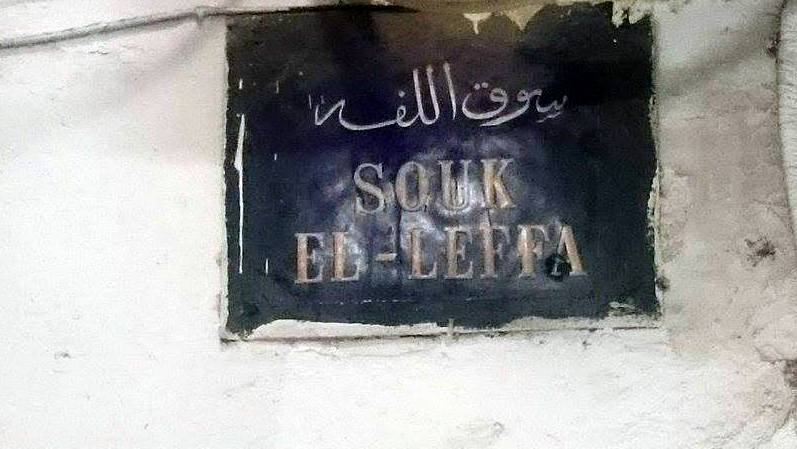
A metallic sign indicating Souk El Leffa

Souk El Leffa (Arabic: سوق اللَفة), also called Souk of Djerbians, is one of the souks of the medina of Tunis. It is called as such because it was mainly occupied by merchants from the Tunisian island of Djerba.

== Location ==
The souk is situated at the heart of the medina of Tunis, next to the Al-Zaytuna Mosque. It continuous towards Souk Es Sekajine, constructed in the early 18th century and specialized today in selling leather crafts.

== History ==
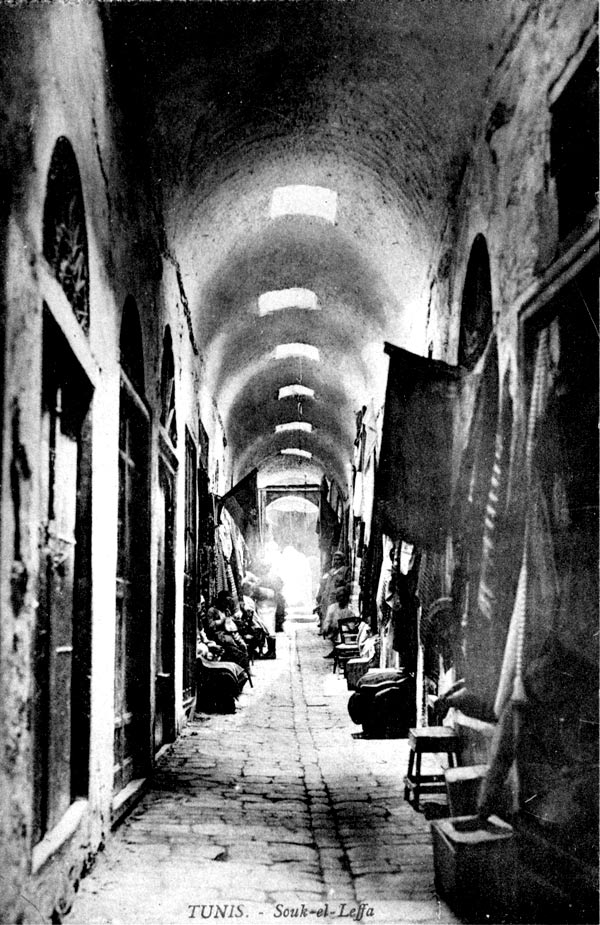
An old image of the souk

Its construction was initiated by Yusuf Dey in the first half of the 17th century as part of an architectural complex resulting in an urban rehabilitation of 200 meters between the Al-Zaytuna Mosque and the kasbah.

It is famous for its wool products trading thanks to merchants from the island of Djerba who mainly trade wool woven products from their island and surrounding regions, especially Gafsa, Tozeur and Djerid. Some craftsmen also weave sefseri at this souk.

== Architecture ==
The souk is covered with barrel vaults made of bricks, with small openings which bring light and ventilation. At this souk, shops are raised about a meter in height by means of plates, which allows visitors and buyers to communicate better with merchants and to observe their goods.

This souk is known to be calm comparing to other souks of Tunis.

== Evolution ==
Founded by Ottomans in the 17th century, being one of their first souks marking a new era in the history of Tunisia, its main activities today are the trading of various products such as textiles, bed covers, clothing, shoes and handicraft products.
