= Souk En Nhas =

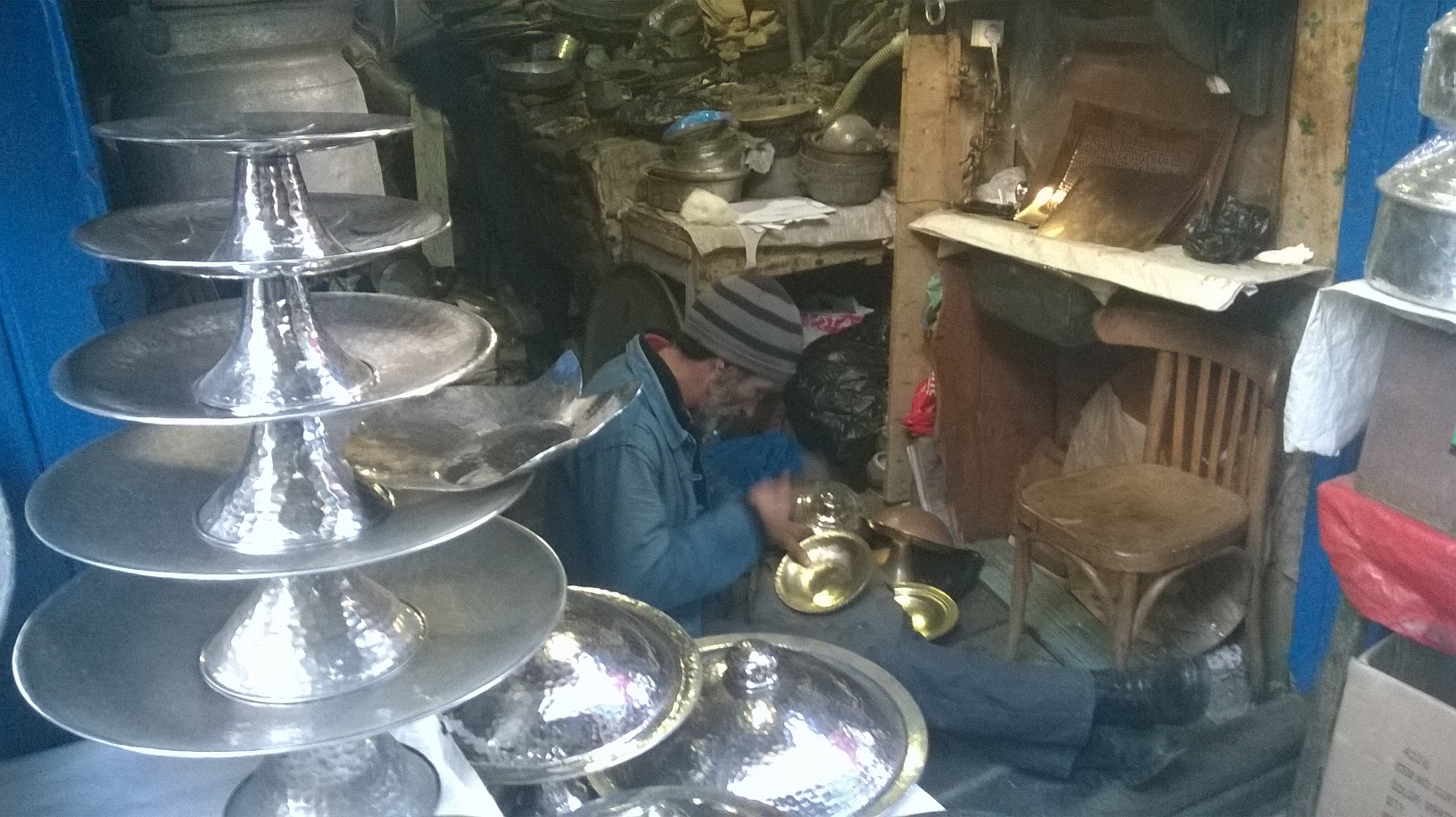
Craftsman in Souk En Nhas.

Souk En Nhas (English: copper market) is one of the souks of the medina of Tunis. It is specialised in selling copper utensils.

== Location ==
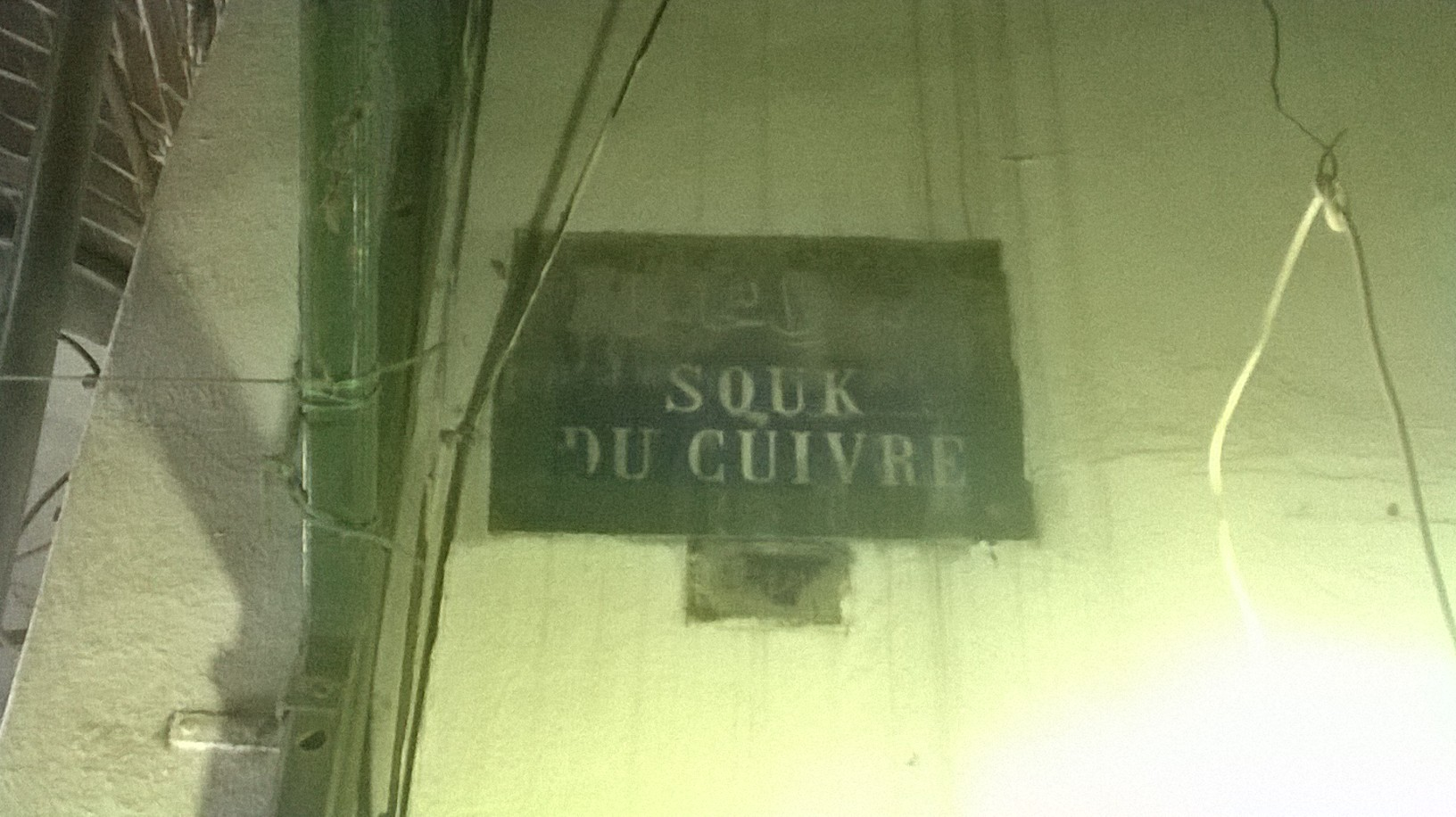
Metallic plaque of Souk En Nhas

The souk location is between the Kasbah Street and Souk El Grana.

== Testimonies ==
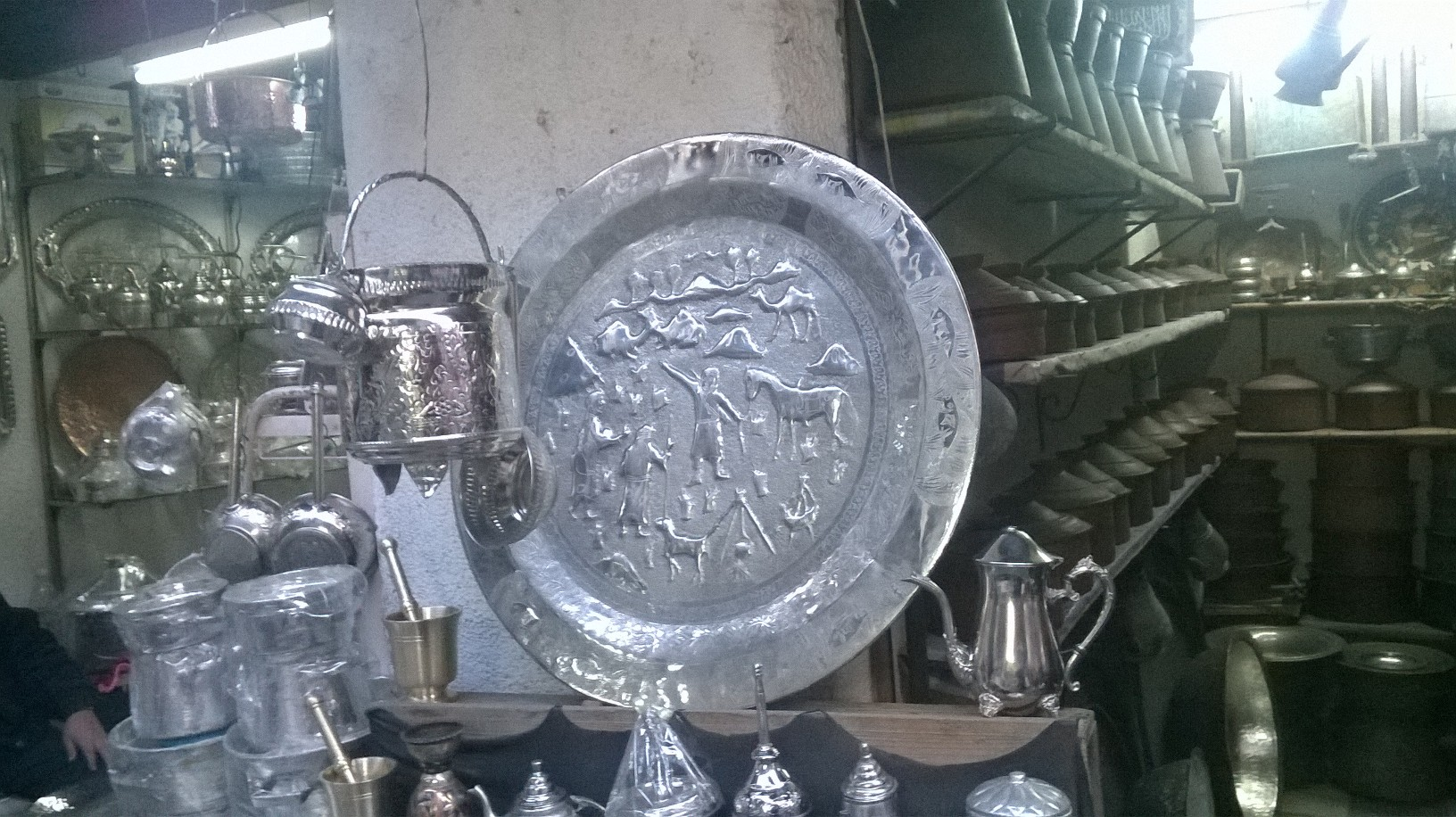
Products at the souk

Charles Lallemand visited Tunisia in the end of the 19th century and left a testimony about the souk.
