= Souk El Trouk =

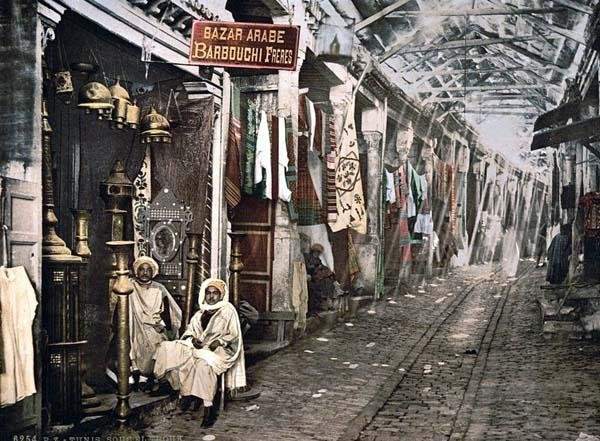
Photochrom of Souk El Trouk in 1899

Souk El Trouk (Arabic: سوق الترك) is one of the souks of the medina of Tunis. It is specialized in clothing and embroidery trading.

== History ==
Souk El Trouk was initiated in the early 17th century by Yusuf Dey to satisfy the Turkish community. At the start, it was dedicated to tailors and embroiders of Turkish costumes such as the kaftan. Its main clients were the Turkish militia in Tunis and the dignitaries of the beylical regime.

== Location ==
The souk is located at the intersection of the Sidi Ben Arous and Tourbet El Bey streets, next to the Youssef Dey Mosque.
