= Souk El Grana =

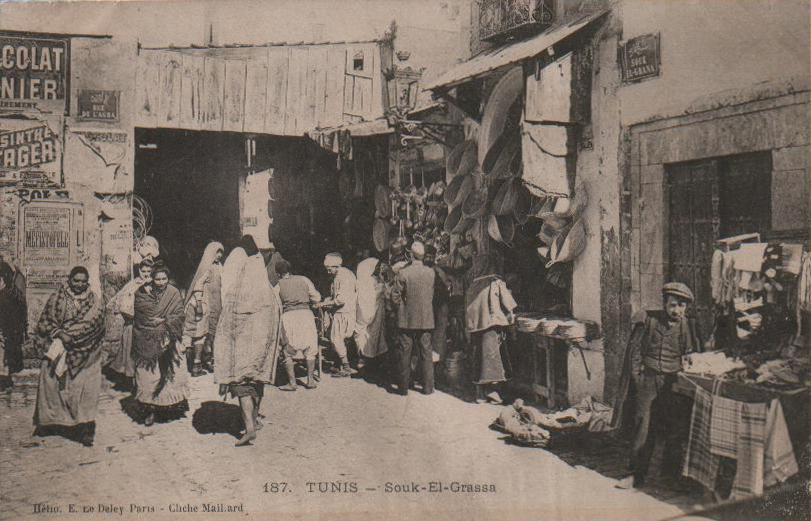
Old view of Souk El Grana

Souk El Grana (Arabic: سوق القرانة) is one of the souks of Tunis. Its name comes from the Granas (Jews from Livorno) who came to Tunisia in the 17th century.

== Location ==
This souk is located in the north of the medina of Tunis, in the Bab Souika neighborhood and near the Al-Zaytuna Mosque.

== History ==
Although this souk existed before the arrival of the Jews from Livorno, it became bigger and better with them. During the 17th century, the Jews transformed this souk into an economic center in Tunis. Agricultural products, crafts, caravans, chachias, ivory, and many other products were sold in this market.

== Architecture ==
The souk is covered by a barrel vault made from bricks. There is also a synagogue made from dimension stone that were taken from the ruins of Roman buildings in Tunis.
