= Souk El Blat =

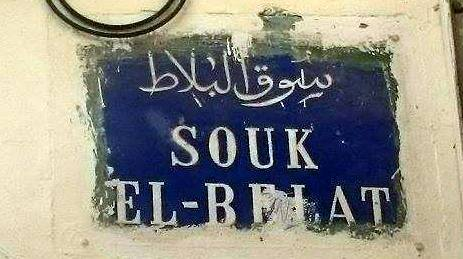
Metallic plaque at the entrance of the souk

Souk El Blat (Arabic: سوق االبلاط) is one of the souks of the medina of Tunis, specialized in medicinal plants.

== Location ==
Souk El Blat is located at the heart of the medina of Tunis. It can be accessed from the south from the Al-Zaytuna Mosque by walking through Souk El Kachachine, or from the Dyers Street. Souk El Blat includes several notable monuments, including:

- Khalwa of Sidi Abou Hassan al-Chadhili
- Dar Bach Hamba
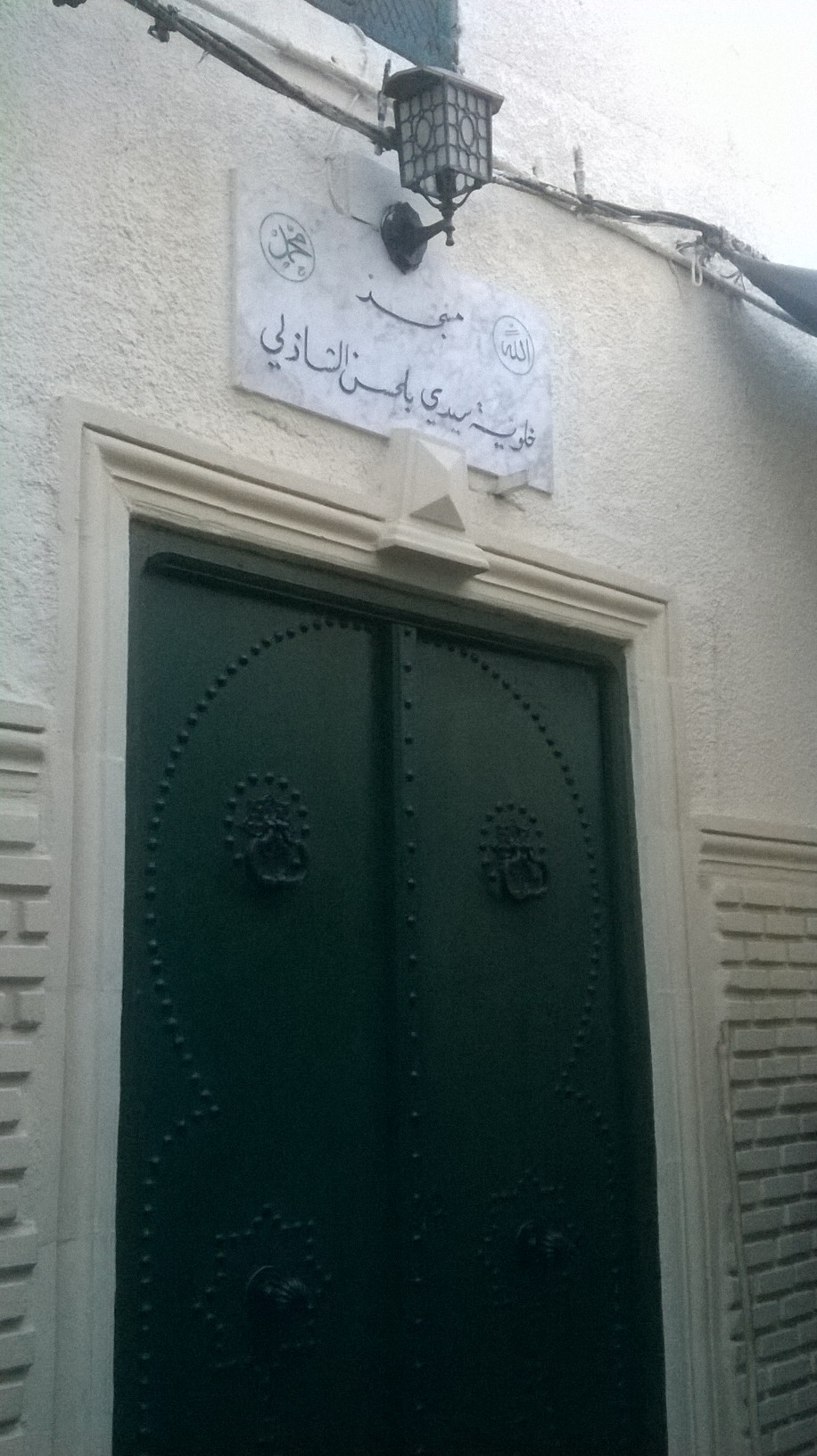
Khalwa of Sidi Abou Hassan al-Chadhili

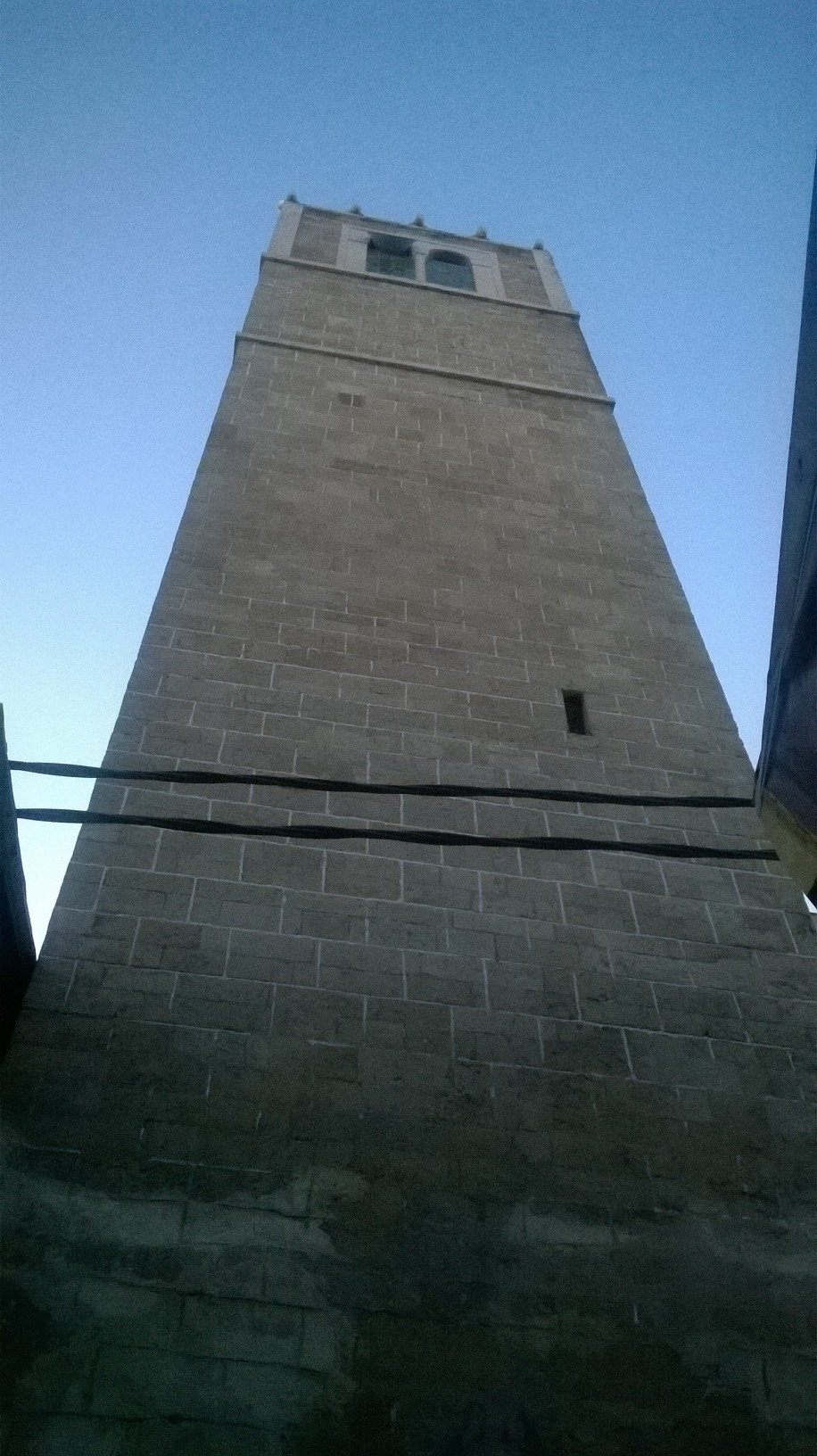
Minaret of the Khalwa of Sidi Abou Hassan al-Chadhili

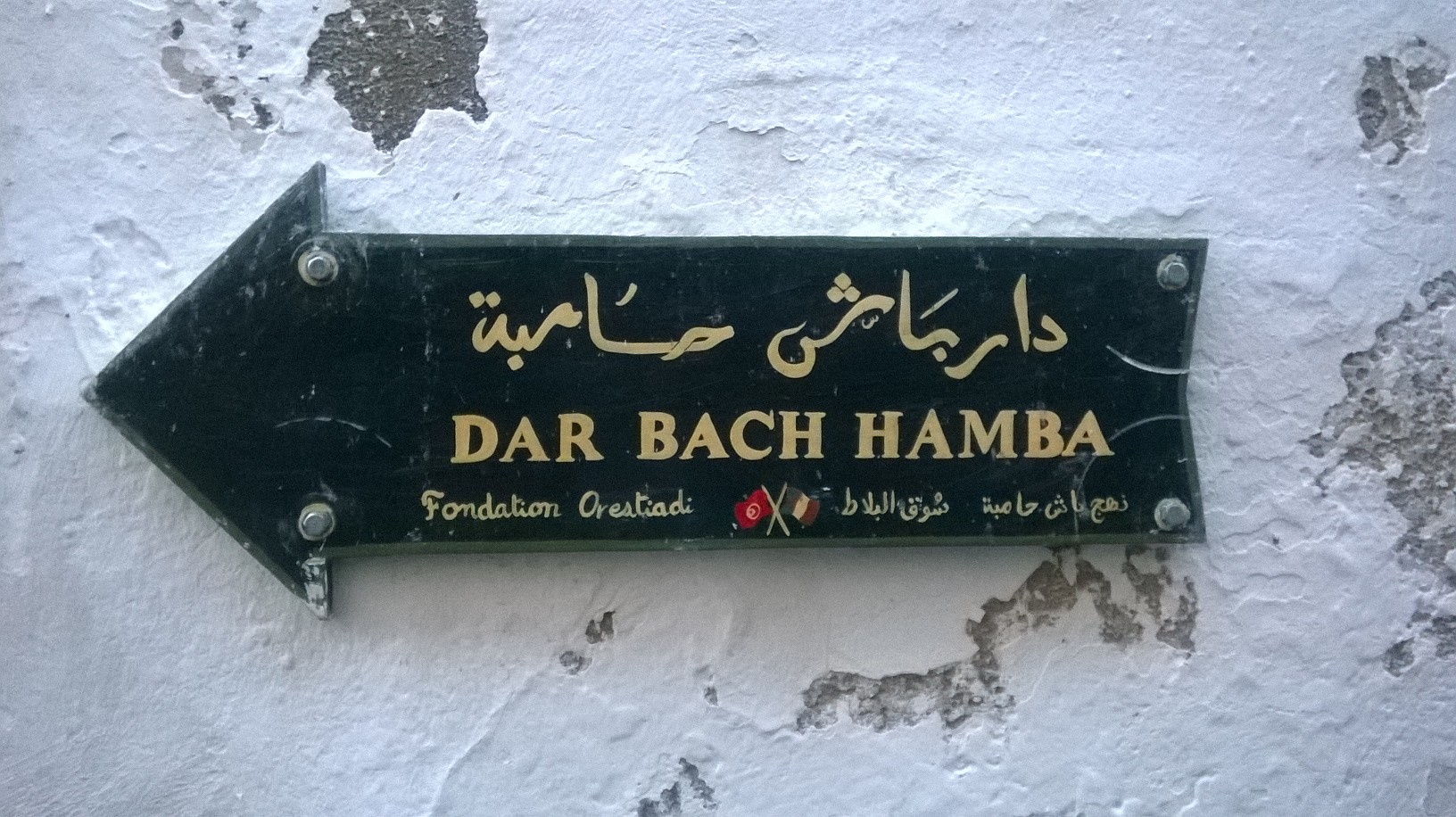
Dar Bach Hamba

== History ==
There is no clear consensus as to when the souk was first established. Some say that it was founded in the 9th century under the Aghlabids, an Arab dynasty that ruled significant portions of North Africa. Others say that it was founded in the 7th century by the army corps of the Khurasanid dynasty. In any case, this market existed during the Hafsid dynasty.

There are many explanations for the naming of this market, such as Charles Lallemand's attribution of the souk's name to that of a specific plant (blata), that used to be found in abundance near the palace of Khurasanids.

== Products ==
Following its establishment, this souk specialized in the selling of medicinal herbs, such as thyme, rosemary, chamomile, cauliflower, fennel, wood violet, poppy, coriander, verbena, eucalyptus, ginger, ginseng, as well as other typical products such as beeswax.

In addition to herbs used for medicinal purposes, one would also find animals like the chameleon or the turtle. Chameleons were placed in a kanoun, a clay vessel typically used to hold burning coals, or sacrificed to protect the house from the evil eye, while turtles were placed at the entrance of the house to guard against infidelity in marriage.

Due to the emergence of modern medicine, the number of vendors in this souk has decreased, thus pushing merchants to change their activities. Most vendors in this souk now sell clothes.
