= Souk Es Sekajine =

Coordinates: 36.795824°N 10.168642°E

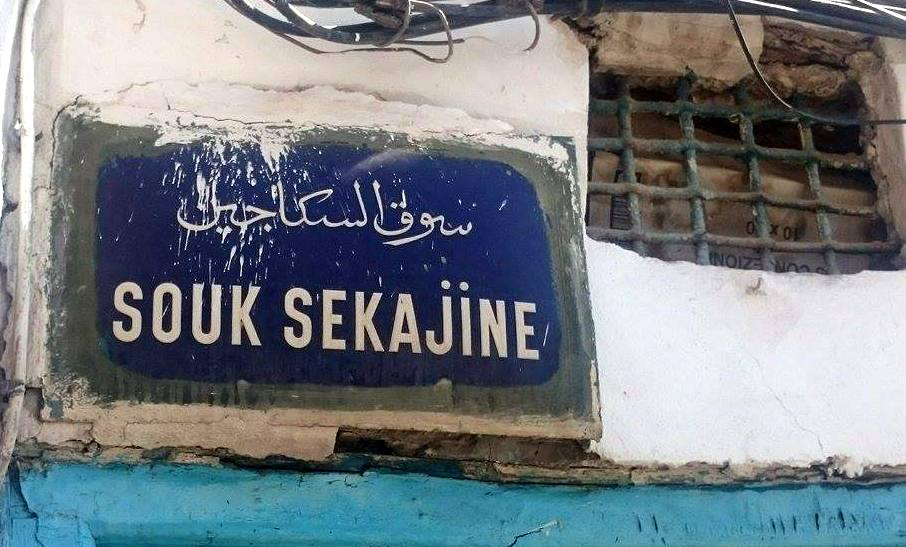
Signage

Souk Es Sekajine (Arabic: سوق السكاجين) or Souk Es Sarragine is one of the souks of the medina of Tunis. specializing in leather goods, saddles, and horse harnesses.

== Name ==
The term Es Sekajine is a mutation of ach-chakkazine, referring to traditional craftsmen who made achkouz, saddles of high-quality leather.

In some European books, it is instead called Souk des Selliers, meaning "souk of saddlers".

== Location ==
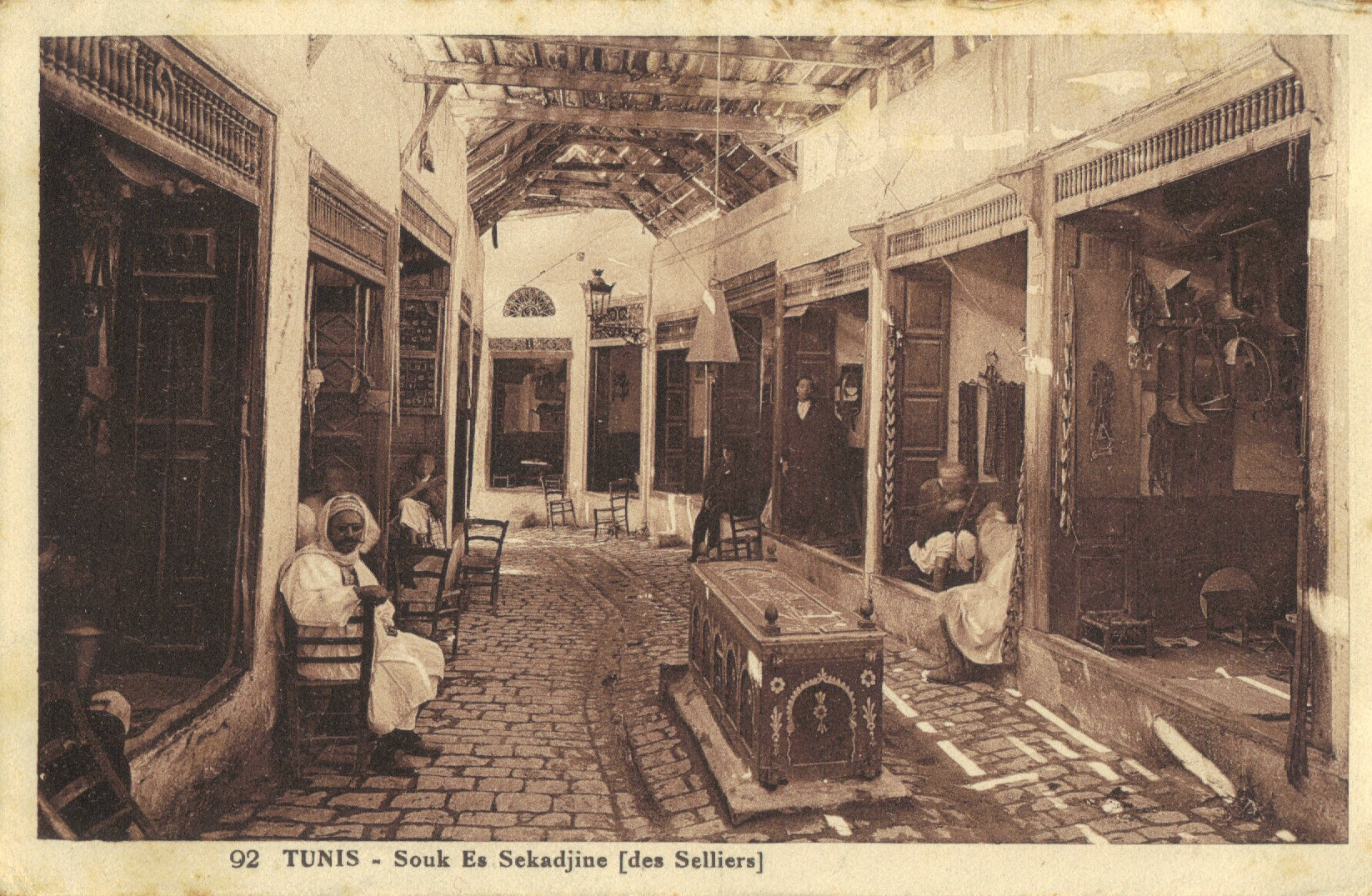
Pre-1930s postcard of the souk

The souk is situated west of Al-Zaytuna Mosque and east of Bab Menara gate.

== History ==
The souk has existed since the 15th century CE. It was revived in the 18th century by Al-Husayn I ibn Ali of the Husainid Dynasty.

In modern times, the souk has a variety of merchants and there are only two saddlemakers remaining there.

== Monuments ==
The souk has two monuments: a Tomb of the Unknown Soldier and the tomb of the Majorcan writer Anselm Turmeda.

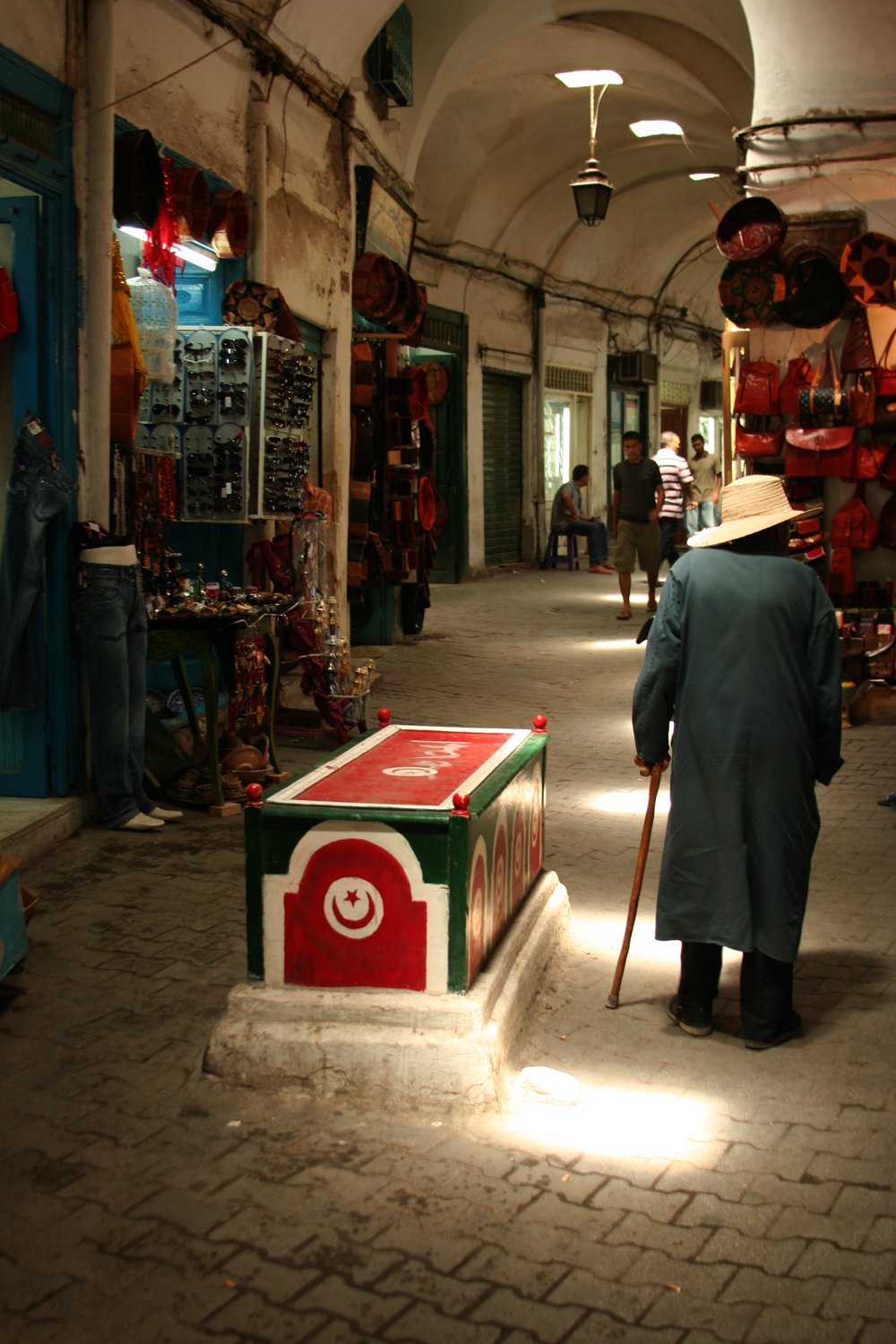
Tomb of the Unknown Soldier.

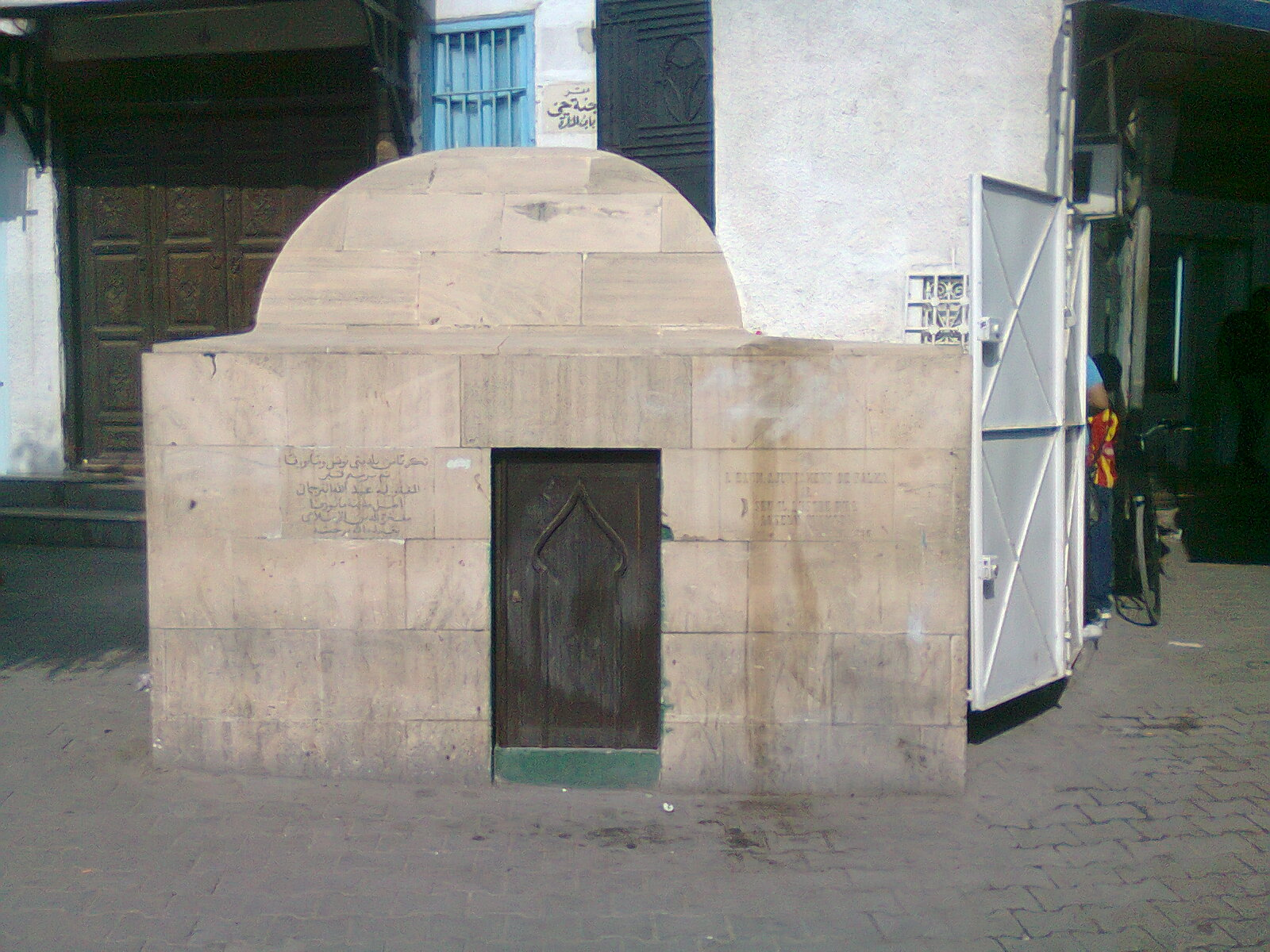
Tomb of Anselm Turmeda, who wrote in both Arabic and Catalan.

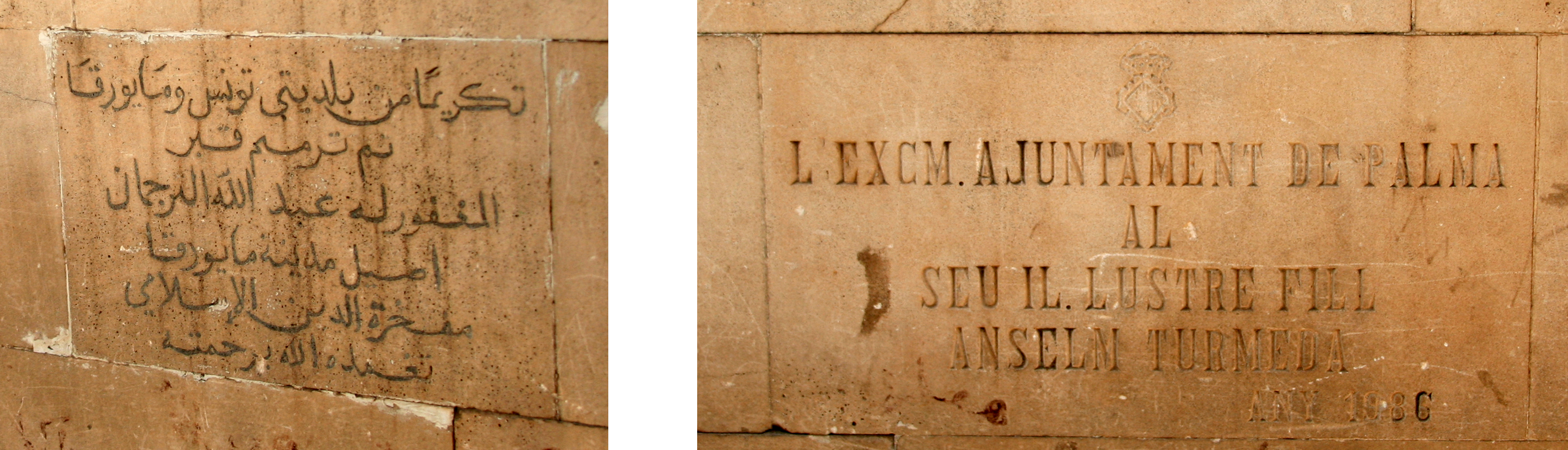
Memorial plaques in Arabic and Catalan on the tomb of Turmeda.
