= Souks of Tunis =

Souqs in Tunis, Tunisia

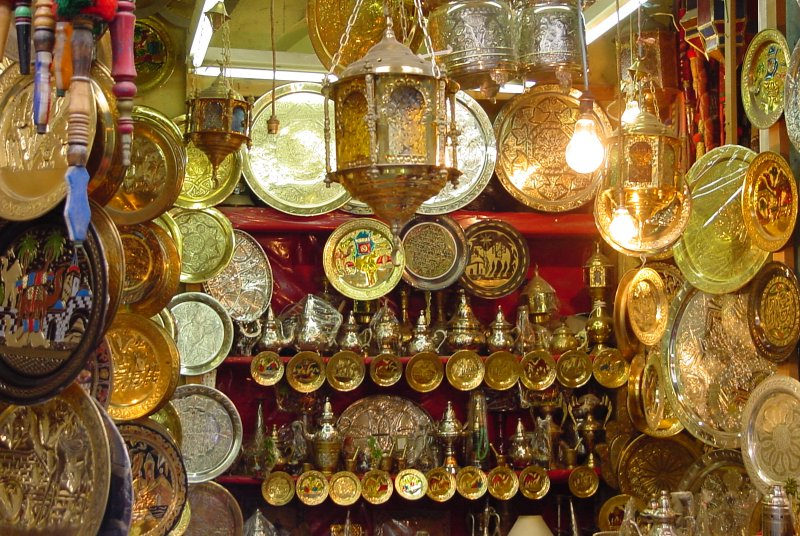
Products at the souk En Nhas

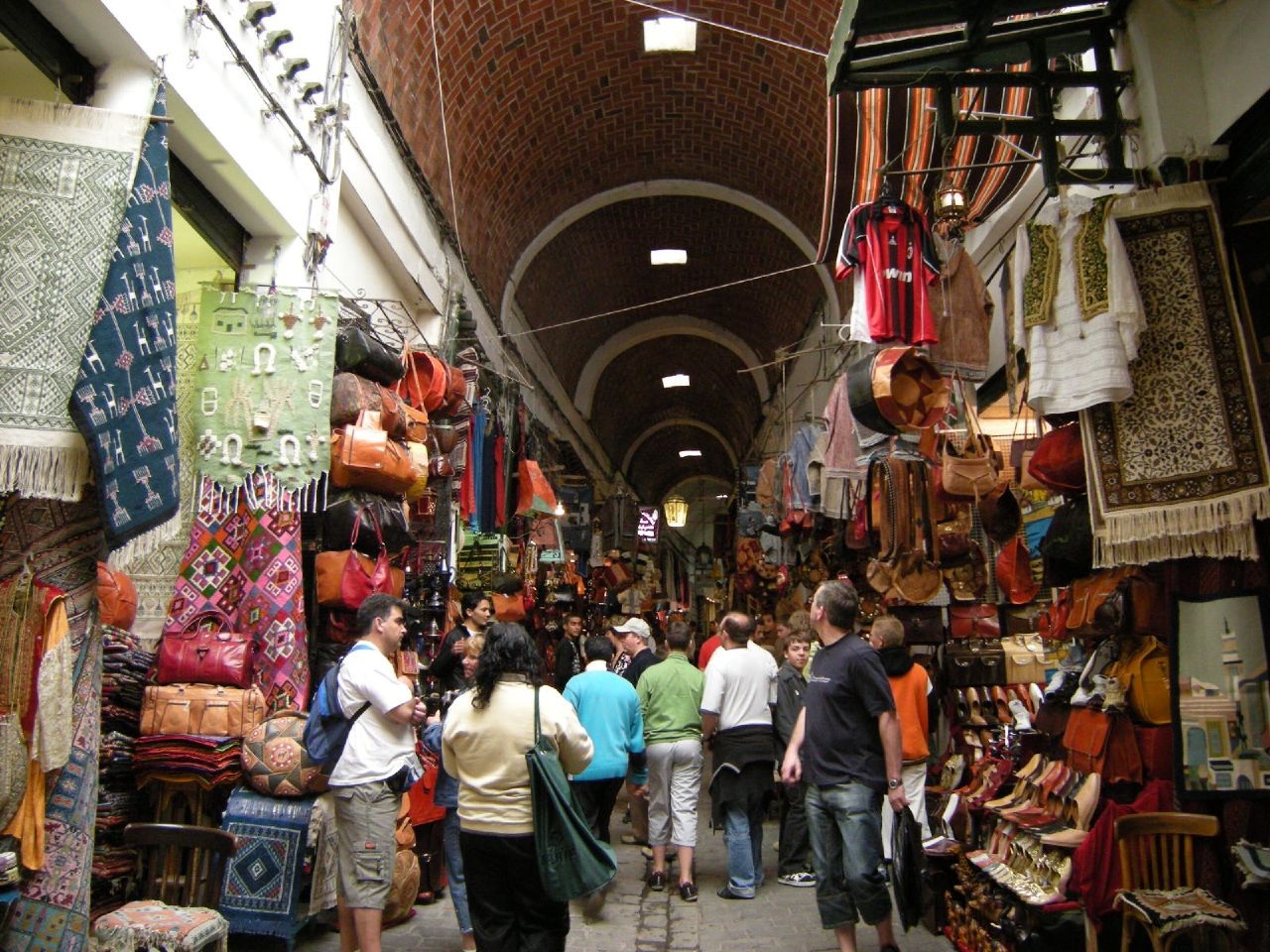
View of the souk El Trouk

The souks of Tunis are a set of shops and boutiques located in the medina of Tunis, capital of Tunisia. Most of the souks were built under the Hafsid dynasty in the 13th century and near the Al-Zaytuna Mosque.

They are organized in several streets and alleys.

== Souk Ech-Chaouachine ==
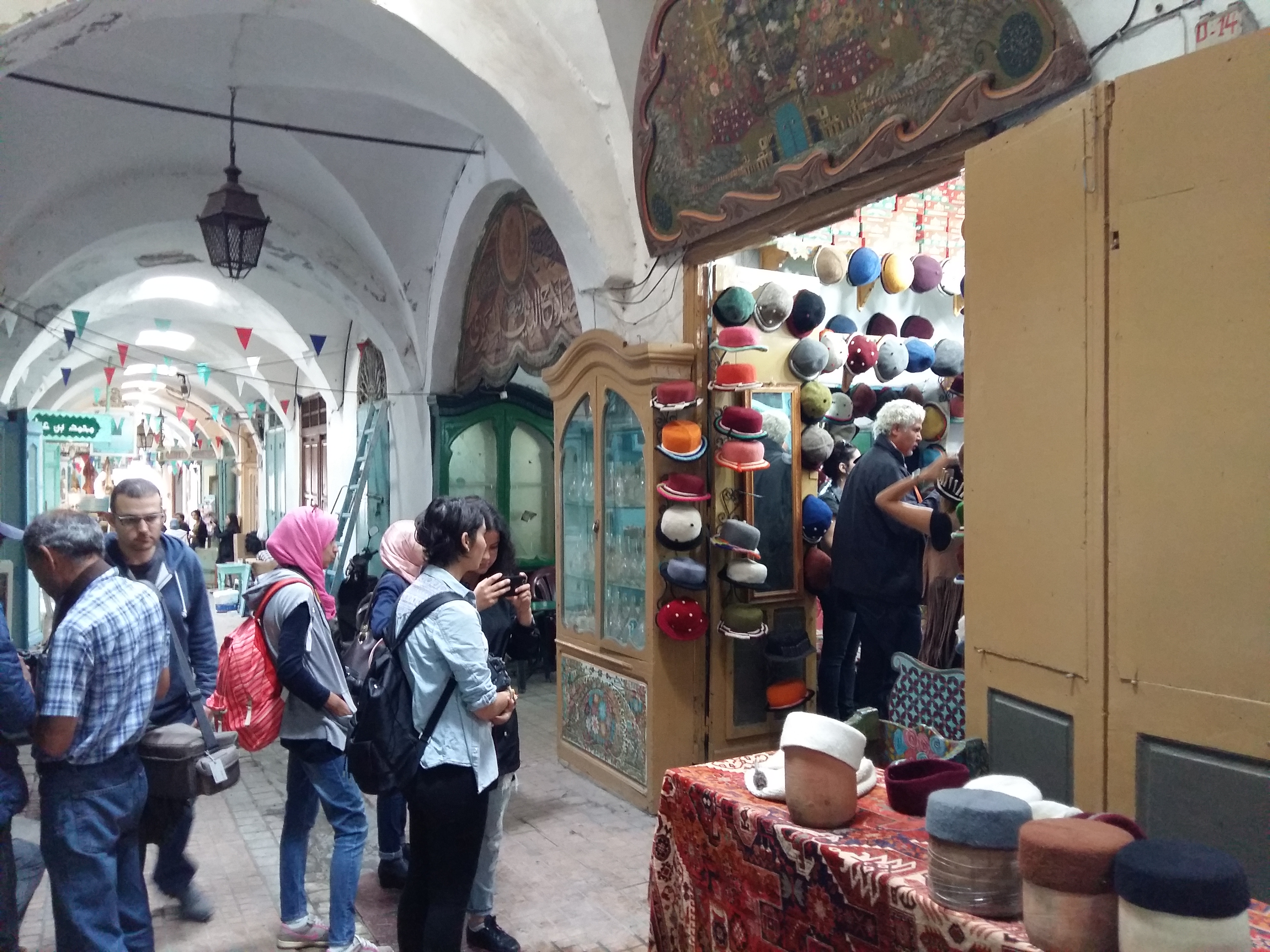
View of souk Ech-Chaouachine

The three souks that form the souk Ech-Chaouachine were built by the Muradid sovereign Mohamed Bey El Mouradi in 1691–1692. At that time, Andalusian immigrants imported the chachia production technique.

== Souk El Attarine ==
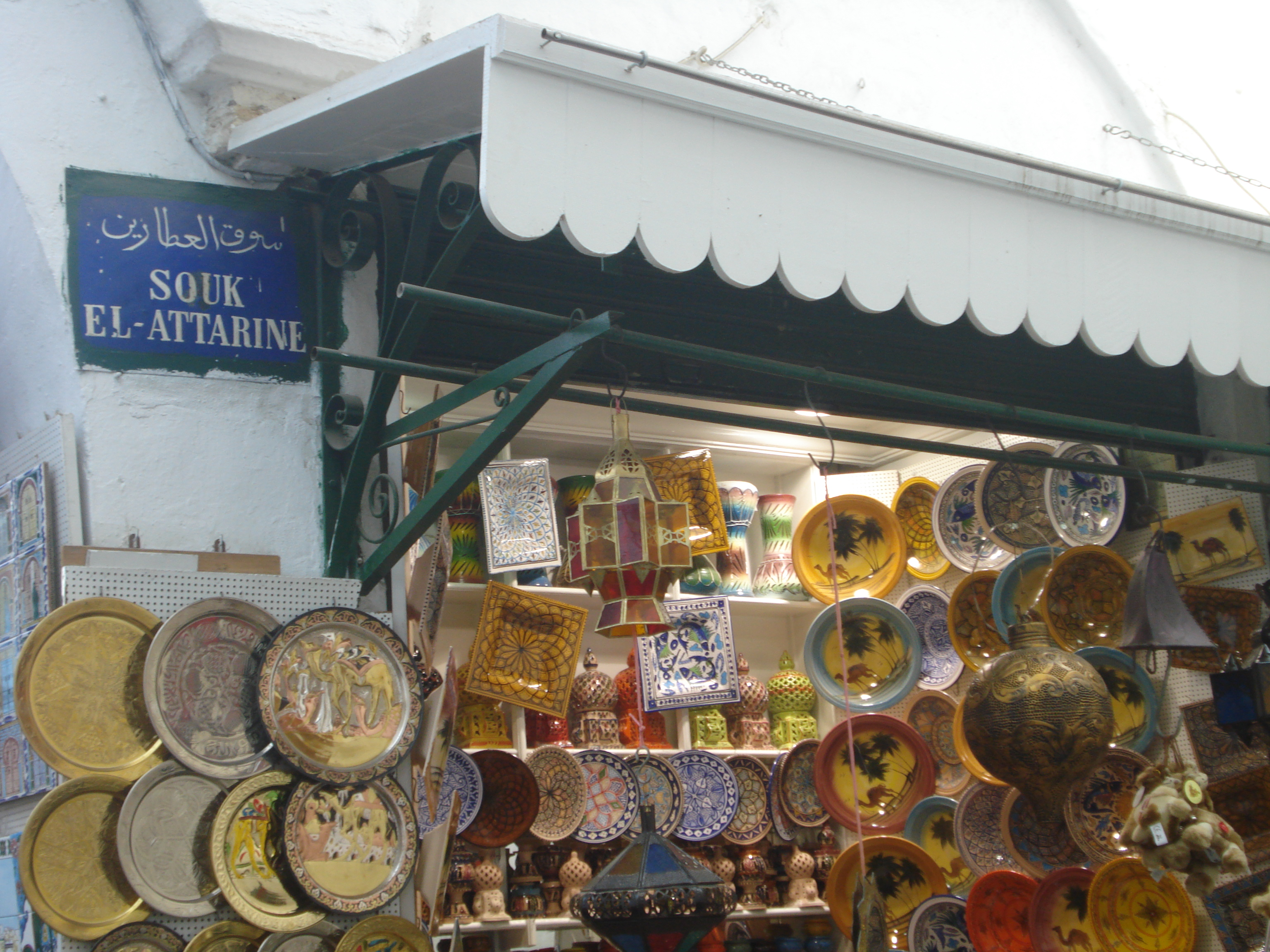
Shop at entrance of souk El Attarine

Built in 1240 by the Hafsid sovereign Abu Zakariya Yahya, the souk El Attarine or souk of perfumers is the oldest souk of Tunis. It is located just behind the Al-Zaytuna Mosque. When this souk was built, nobles and business owners were the only ones with the right to do this job. Therefore, it was considered one of the finest. Fragrances compounds of rare and valuable species were sold, there was also incense from India and Yemen, as well as some cosmetics.

== Souk El Berka ==
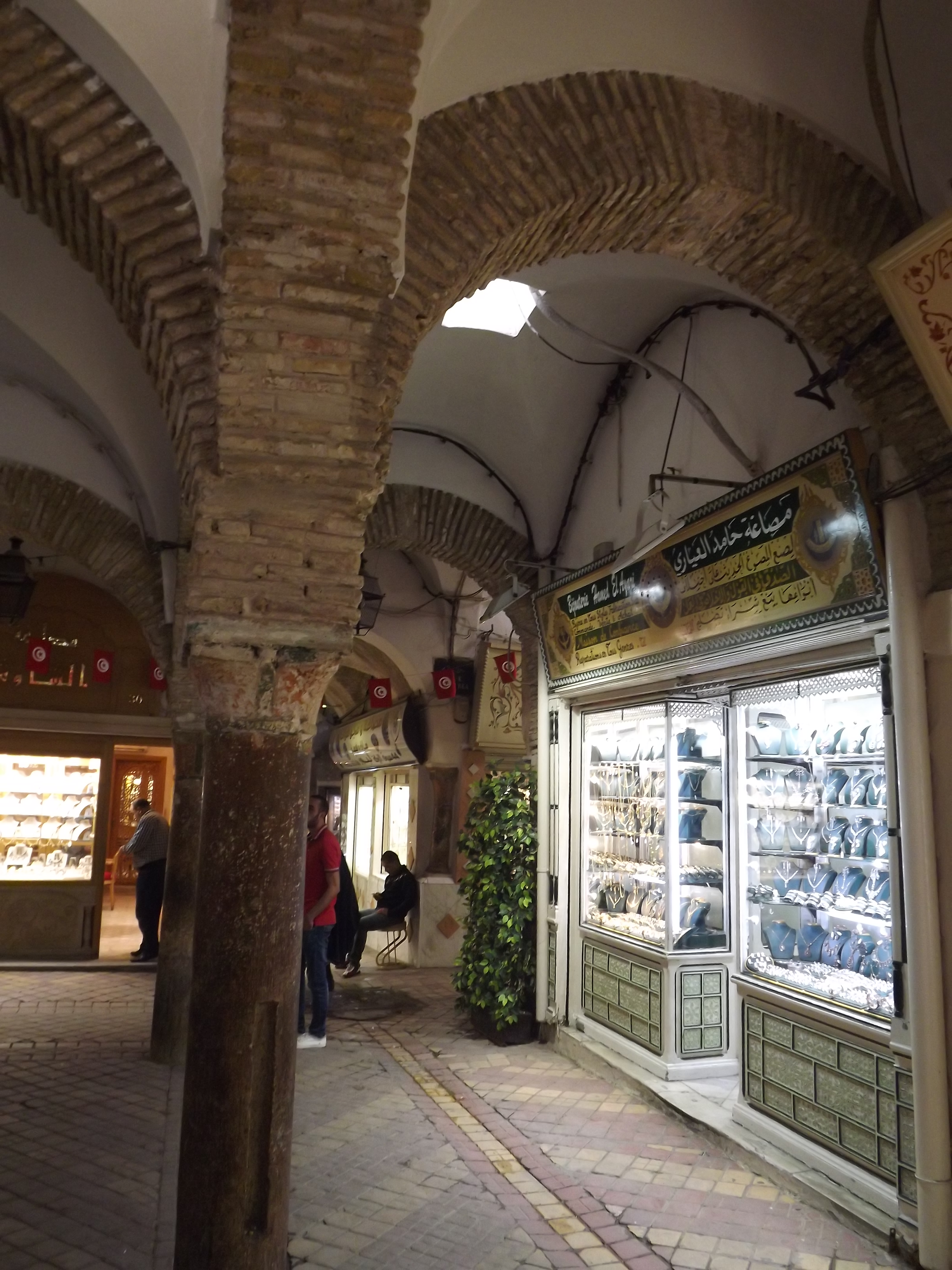
Boutique from souk El Berka

Built in 1612 by Yusuf Dey, the souk El Berka is the old souk of black slaves in Tunis. This souk became later the souk of jewelers.

This souk has a square form, with a wooden platform in the middle which was the place where slaves were presented and waited for the outcome of the sale. Potential buyers were sitting on benches around the souk and participated in the auction. The white slaves, considered the rarest and most valuable, were not sold in the souk but in more remote locations because the sale concerned only wealthy potential buyers. The abolition of slavery in Tunisia was declared by Ahmad I ibn Mustafa in 1846 and caused the transformation of the souk into souk of jewelers specializing in silverware.

== Souk El Bey ==
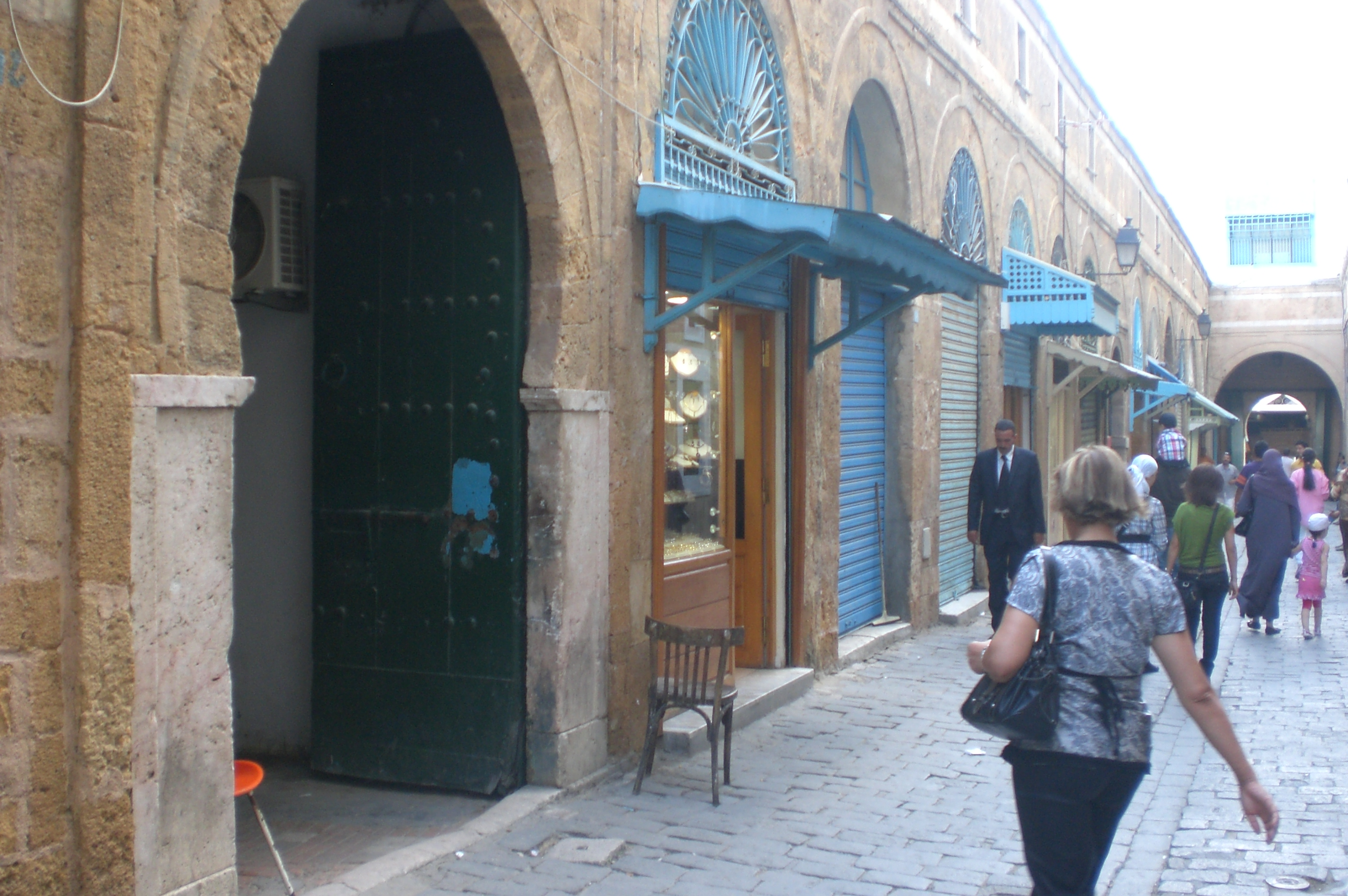
View of souk El Bey

The souk El Bey was founded by Hammuda ibn Ali. It is located between the Kasbah of Tunis and the souk El Berka. The souk is now specializing in the sale of precious metals.

== Souk El Blaghgia ==
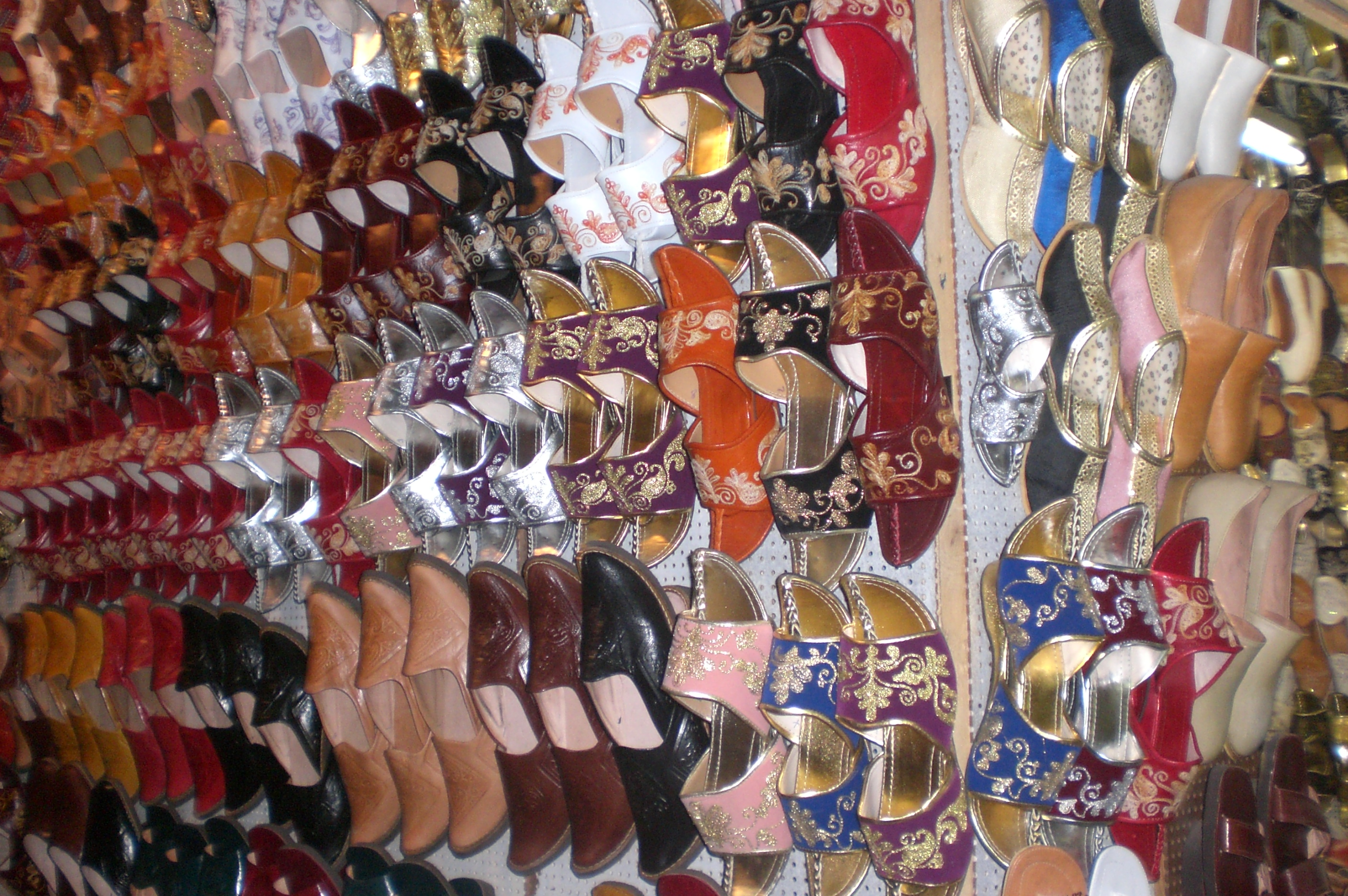
Different models of balghas in the souk

The souk El Blaghgia was founded by Abu Zakariya Yahya in the early 18th century. It is located between souk El Attarine and the Kasbah Street. This souk is specialized in the sale of balghas, a shoe made from leather.

== Souk El Blat ==
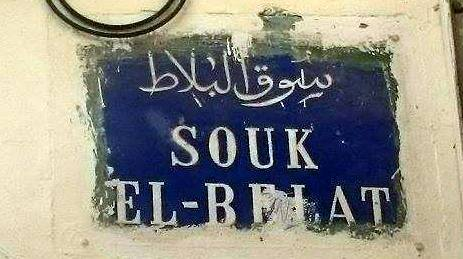
Metal plate at the entrance of souk El Blat

The souk El Blat specializes in the sale of medicinal plants. The number of sellers decreased significantly with the growth of modern medicine.

== Souk El Fekka ==
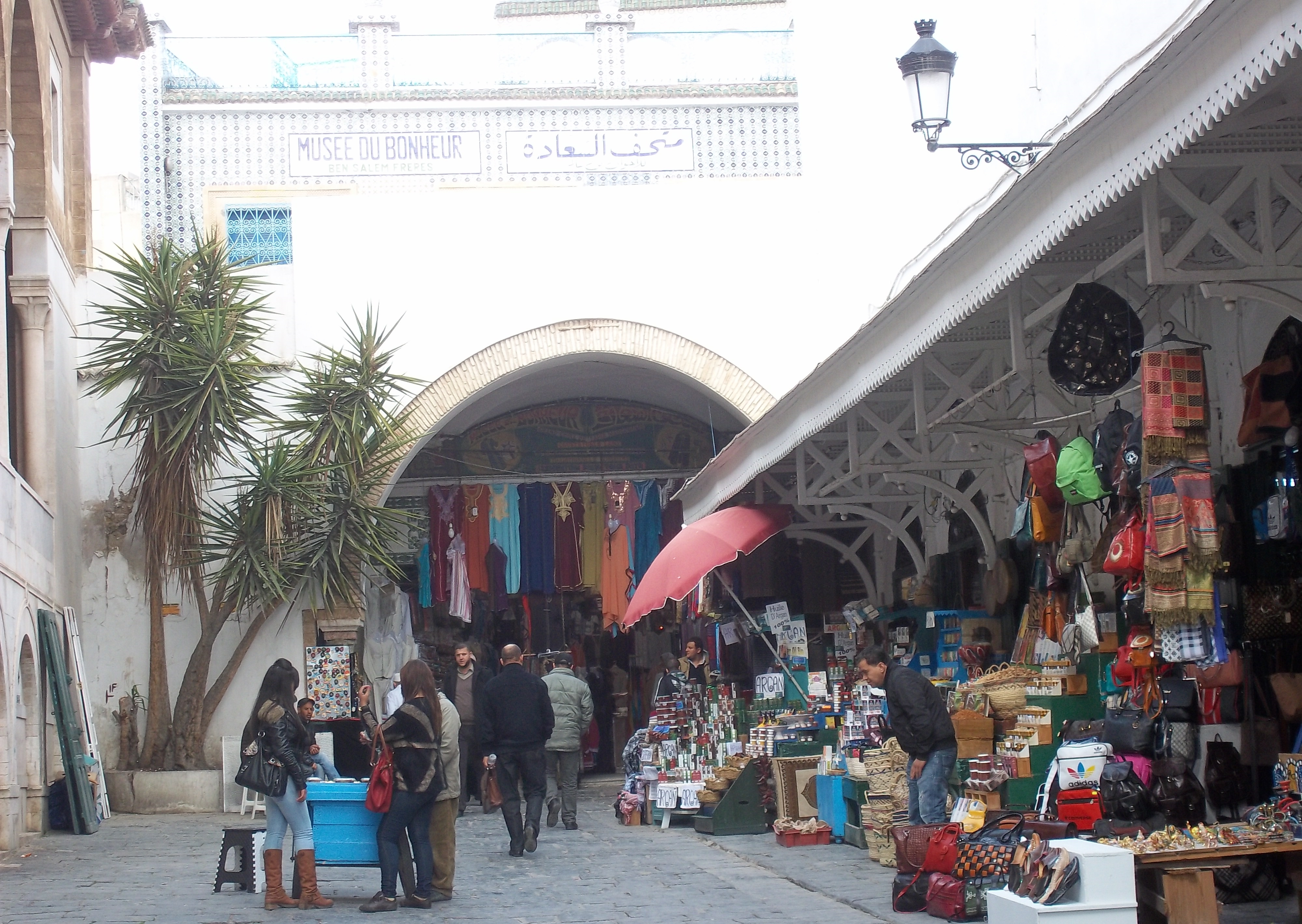
View of souk El Fekka

The souk El Fekka is located directly in front of the Al-Zaytuna Mosque, near the souk El Attarine. It sells ingredients necessary to prepare cakes for various celebrations such as circumcision, marriage or Eid al-Fitr.

== Souk El Grana ==
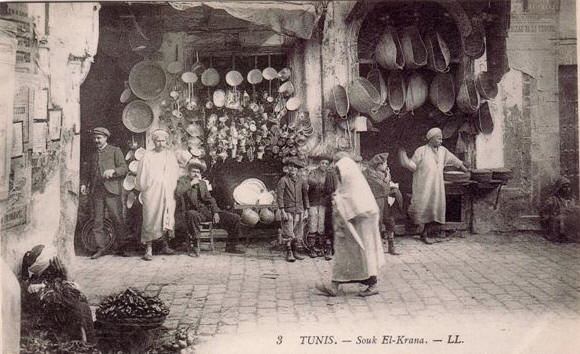
Old view of souk El Grana

The souk El Grana is located in the northern suburb of the medina, in the district of Bab Souika. It has been marked by Granas, Jews settled in Tunisia from Livorno in the early 17th century.

The souk hosts the sale of linens, silks, fabrics, garments and handicrafts.

== Souk El Kébabgia ==
Souk El Kebabjia is located west of Al-Zaytuna Mosque, in parallel to Souk El Berka and close to Souk El Trouk from one end and to Souk Es Sekajine from the other end. It is specialized in the traditional clothing accessories.

== Souk El Kmach ==
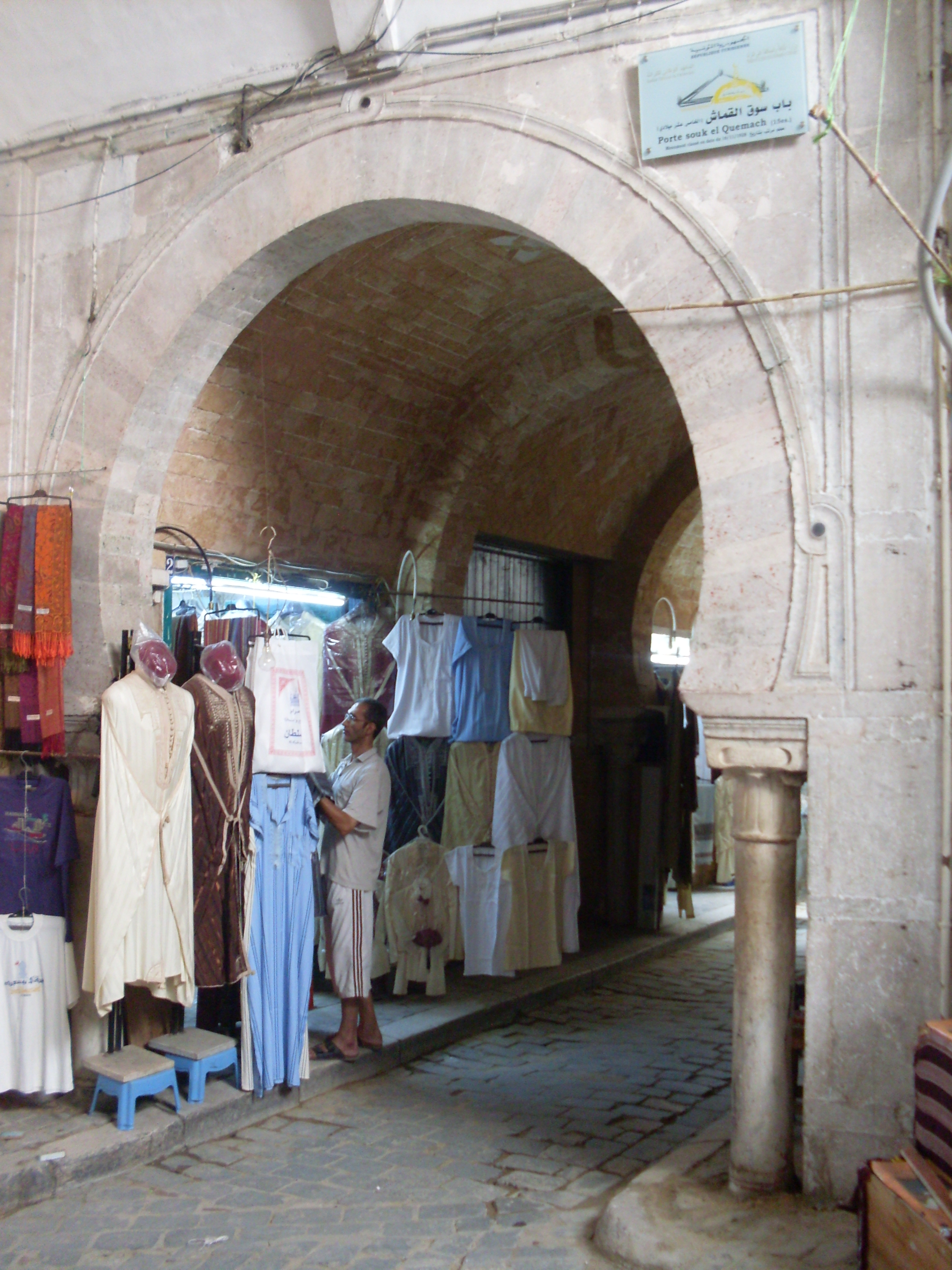
Entrance of souk El Kmach

The souk El Kmach or souk of textile, was founded in the 15th century by the Hafsid sovereign Uthman. It is located on the western facade of the Al-Zaytuna Mosque.

== Souk El Koutbiya ==
The souk El Koutbiya was built by Abu l-Hasan Ali I in 1750. It is specialized in selling books.

== Souk El Leffa ==
The souk El Leffa, also called Souk of Djerbians, is known for the sale of wool products through merchants from the island of Djerba. Artisans also make the traditional sefseri (a traditional outfit for women).

== Souk El Nissa ==
El Nissa means Women in Arabic. This souk is located at the south of Al-Zaytuna Mosque, near the souk of wool. Women used to come to buy and sell goods.

== Souk El Trouk ==
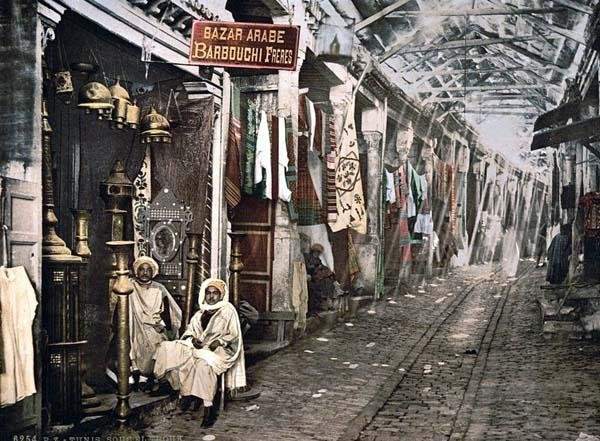
View of souk El Trouk in 1899

The name of the souk El Trouk is much debated, but there is an agreement that the word comes from tourk (Turkish) in Arabic with trouk, the word for Antiquities (tirka).

This souk was built in 1620 by Yusuf Dey. It is located between the Al-Zaytuna Mosque and the centers of Ottoman power, the Kasbah and Dar El Bey. It was dedicated to Turkish customers and craftsmen; Turkish craftsmen were replaced gradually by Jewish craftsmen.

This souk is now the place where items like flea markets and antiques are sold.

== Souk En Nhas ==
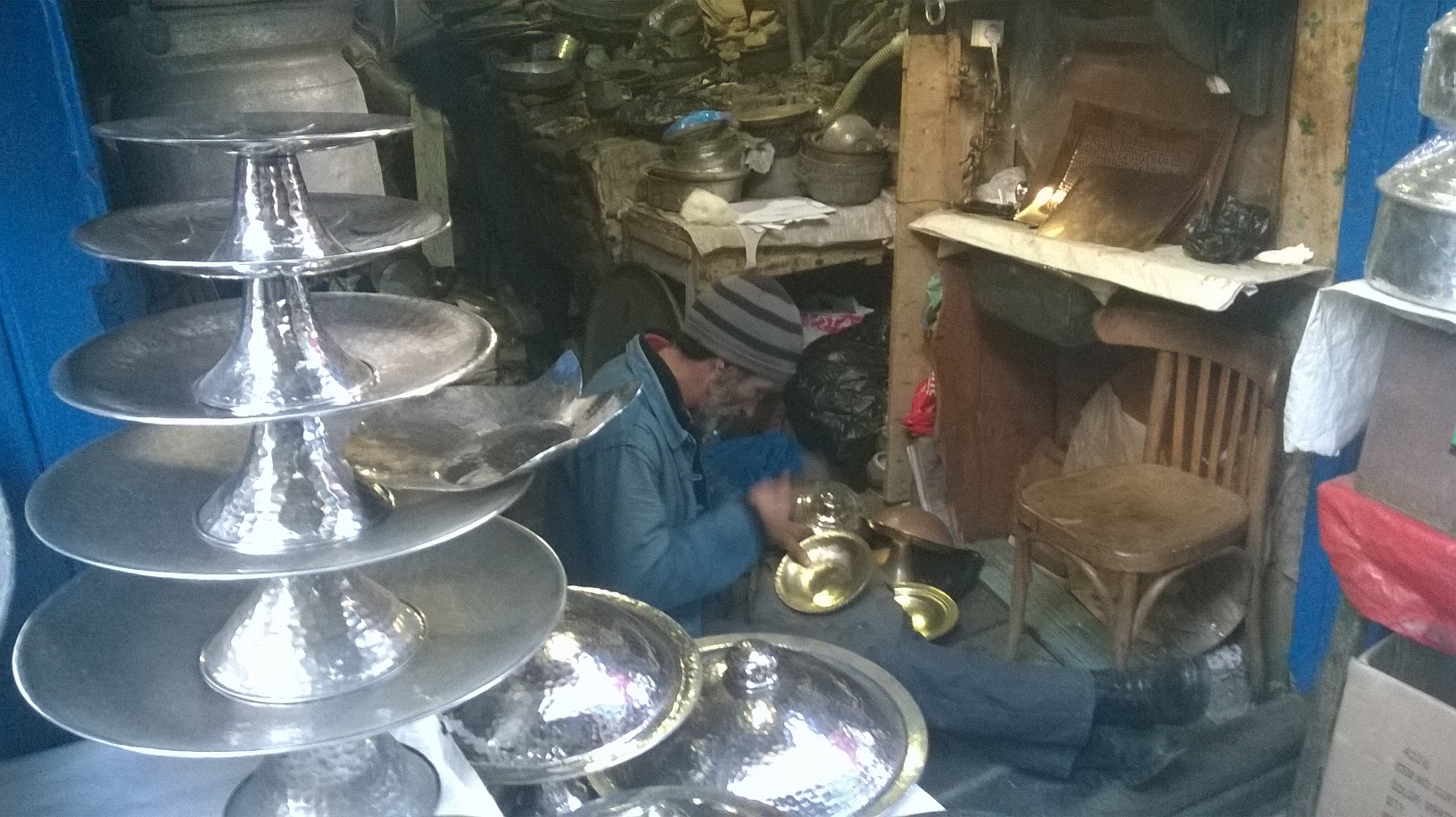
Some products of souk En Nhas

Built under the Hafsid dynasty, the souk En Nhas or souk of copper is specialized in the sale of copper utensils. It is located between the souk El Grana and the Kasbah Street.

== Souk Es Sabbaghine ==
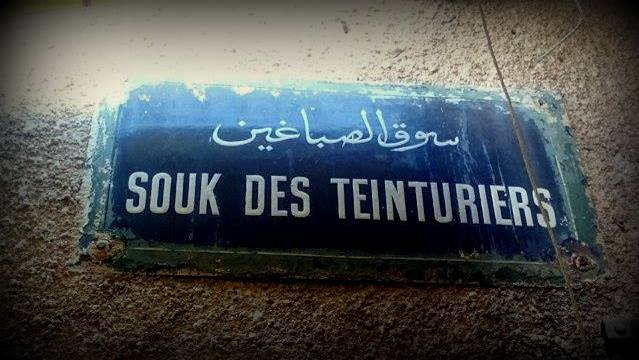
Metal plaque showing the name of the souk

The souk Es Sabbaghine, or souk of Dyers, is located on the outskirts of the medina, far away from the Al-Zaytuna Mosque because dyeing is considered a polluting activity. The denomination Es Sabbaghine or Dyers originates from the dyeing of wool, cotton and silk.

Today, the souk sells a variety of products, especially ready-to-wear clothes and shoes, but also fish and meat.

== Souk Es Sarragine ==
Souk Es Sarragine or Souk Es Sekajine is situated west of Al-Zaytuna Mosque and east of Bab Menara gate. It is specialized in leather goods, saddles, and horse harnesses.

== See also ==
- Bazaar
- Bazaari
- Market (place)
- Retail
- Souq
