= Mohamed Zouaoui (footballer) =

Tunisian football figure (1896–1978)

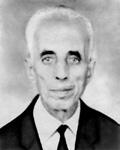

Personal information
- Date of birth: 1896
- Place of birth: Damascus, Syria
- Date of death: 31 March 1978 (aged 81–82)

Senior career*
Years	Team	Apps	(Gls)
1919–c. 1931	Espérance		

Managerial career
- 1925: Espérance (president)
- * Club domestic league appearances and goals

Mohamed Zouaoui (1896 – 31 March 1978) was a notable figure in Tunisian football. He was a co-founder of the club Espérance Sportive de Tunis (EST) and played for them for 12 years.

== Biography ==
Born in 1896 in Damascus to a family of Kabyle origin, Zouaoui studied at a madrasa as his father opposed him learning French, the language of the colonizers. In 1903, he pursued his studies in Halfaouine, then from 1916 to 1918, he attended the Zitouna Mosque. However, he abandoned his studies and became an apprentice shoemaker in Souk El Blaghgia.

As a co-founder of Espérance Sportive de Tunis (EST) in 1919, Zouaoui initially served as vice-president in the club's first executive board. Later, with Louis Montassier's appointment as president, Zouaoui became a regular board member, despite his initial reluctance to be part of a committee led by a French national. Zouaoui played for EST for 12 years and briefly held a symbolic leadership role for a few weeks in 1925 to fill the vacancy left by Chedly Zouiten, who had traveled to France to study medicine.

In 1928, Zouaoui became a merchant in Lafayette before working for a major trader in Souk El Attarine. From 1935, he was employed at Nhas store in North Africa and later co-managed a fruit business until 1958.

He remained single throughout his life and dedicated himself to raising eight children left behind by one of his deceased relatives. He died on 31 March 1978.
