= Souk El Ghrabliyya =

Souk of the medina old town of Tunis

Coordinates: 36.798201°N 10.171737°E

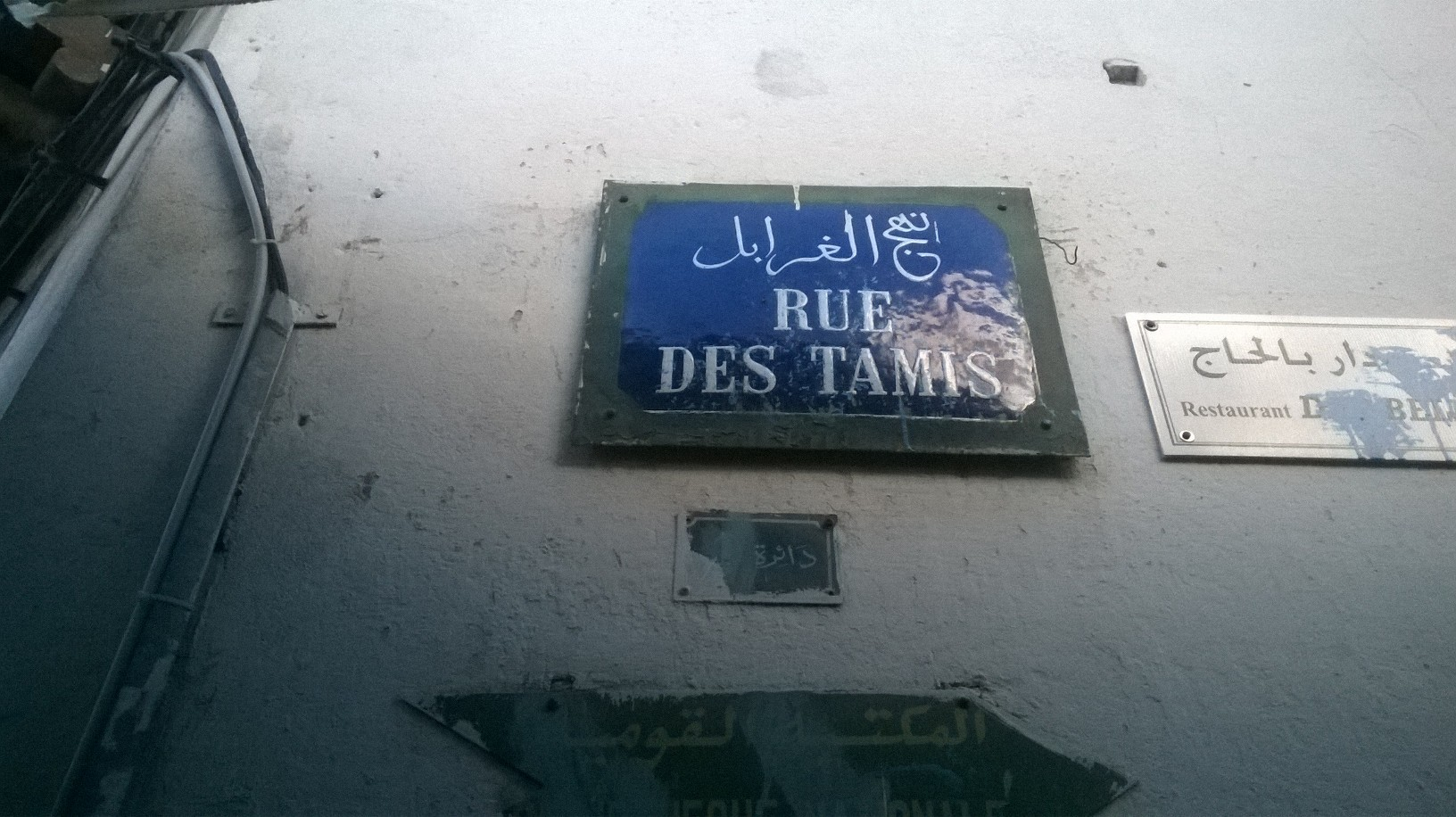
Plaque métallique indiquant la rue des Tamis, siège du souk El Ghrabliyya

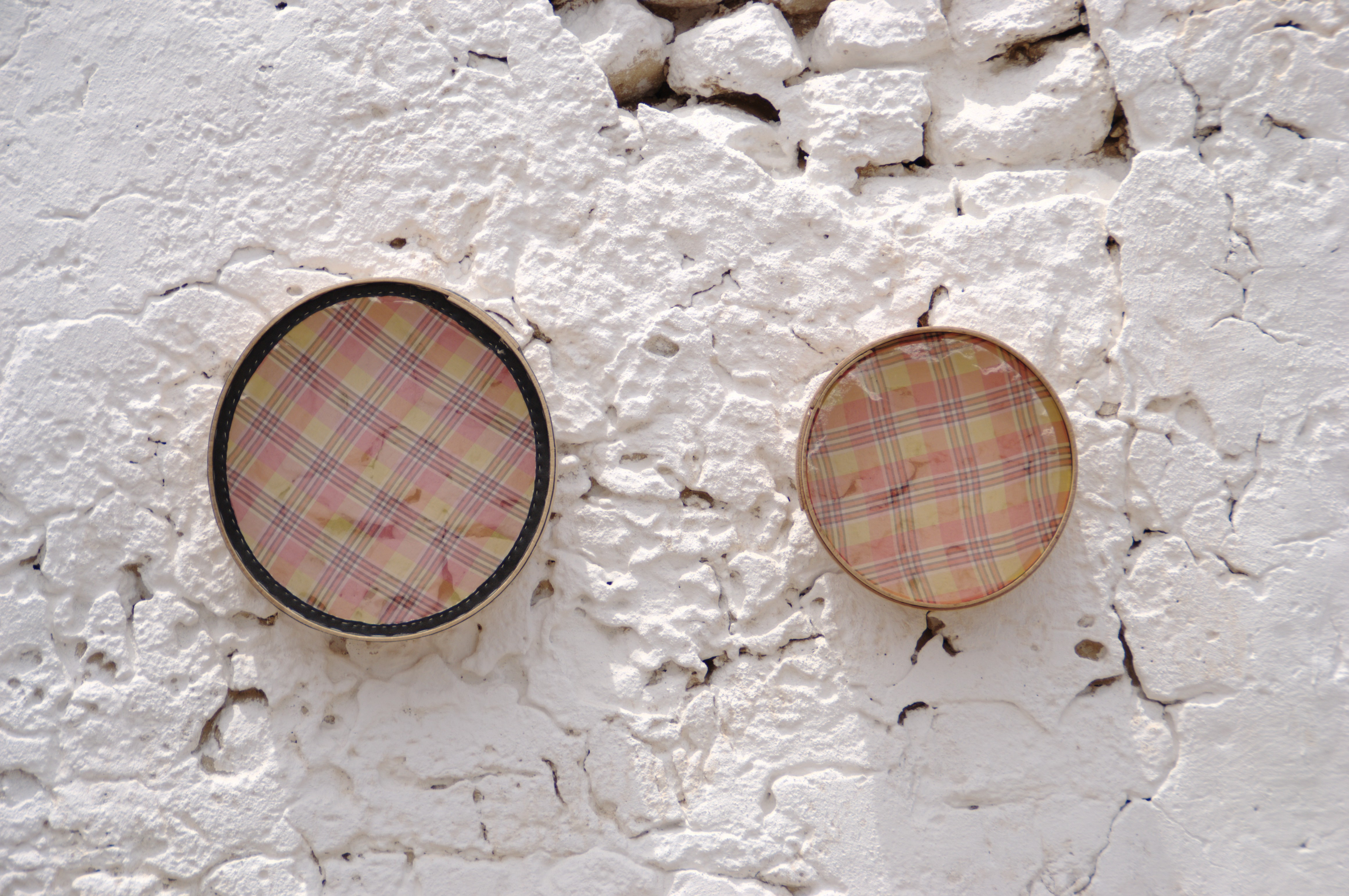
Example de tamis

Souk El Ghrabliyya (Arabic: سوق الغرابلية) is one of the souks of the medina of Tunis.

== Location ==
The souk is located in the north-east of Al-Zaytuna Mosque, in El Ghrabel Street.

It can be accessed from Souk El Attarine, Souk El Blaghgia, and Souk El Ouzar.

== Products ==
It is specialized in the producing and selling of sieves.
