= Souk El Kmach =

Souq in Tunis, Tunisia

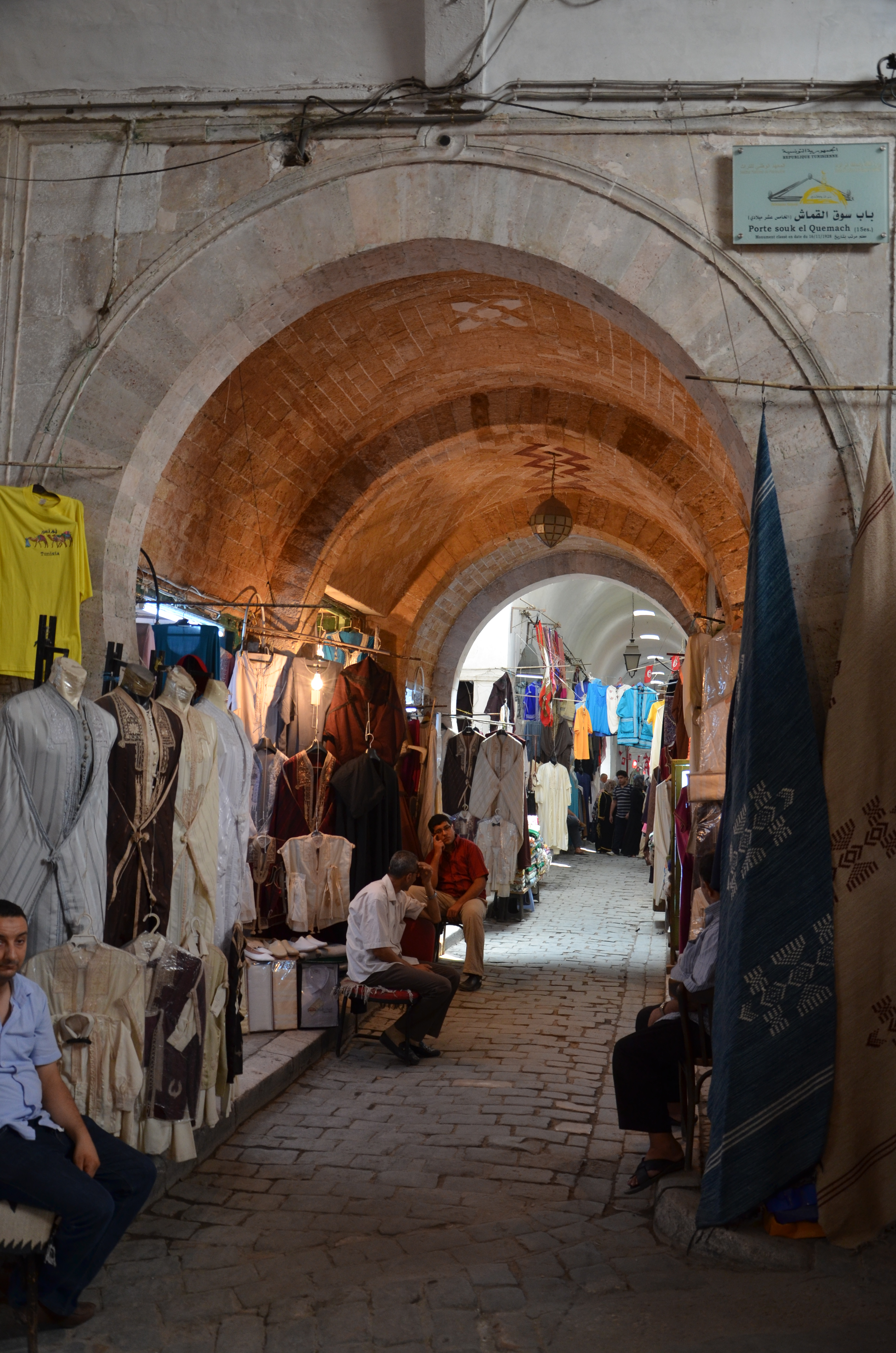
Entrance of souk El Kmach

Souk El Kmach (Arabic: سوق القماش) or the fabrics market is one of the most important souks of the medina of Tunis. It is the place where fabrics and tissues are sold, whether they are made in Tunisia or luxury products especially imported like silk or linen.

== History ==
The souk was constructed at the order of the Hafsid sovereign Abou Amr Uthman in the 15th century at the place of an older souk, namely Souk El Rammadine.

== Location ==
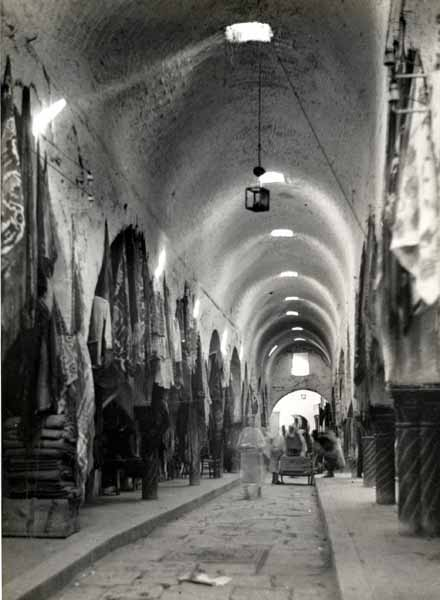
Ancient picture of the souk

Souk El Kmach goes along with the western facade of the Al-Zaytuna Mosque. In fact, it offers easy access to the mosque through three doors. Also, it is bounded by three other souks : Souk El Trouk, Souk El Leffa and Souk El Nissa.

Two doors provide direct access to Souk El Kmach : Souk El Attarine's is known for its two Spanish-Maghrebi capitals columns. Bab Souk El Kmach is a gate.

== Description ==
The souk has three aisles separated by two rows of columns. The one at the centre allows traffic while the two lateral aisles give access to the stores. All the souk is covered by longitudinal cradles. Yet, some skylights in the central vault illuminate the place. This lighting system can be found in the stores of the souk, too. Among the monuments of this souk are the madrasa Mouradiya and the zawiya of the savant Ibn Asfour.
