= Souk El Souf =

Market in Tunis, Tunisia

Coordinates: 36.7970°N 10.1712°E

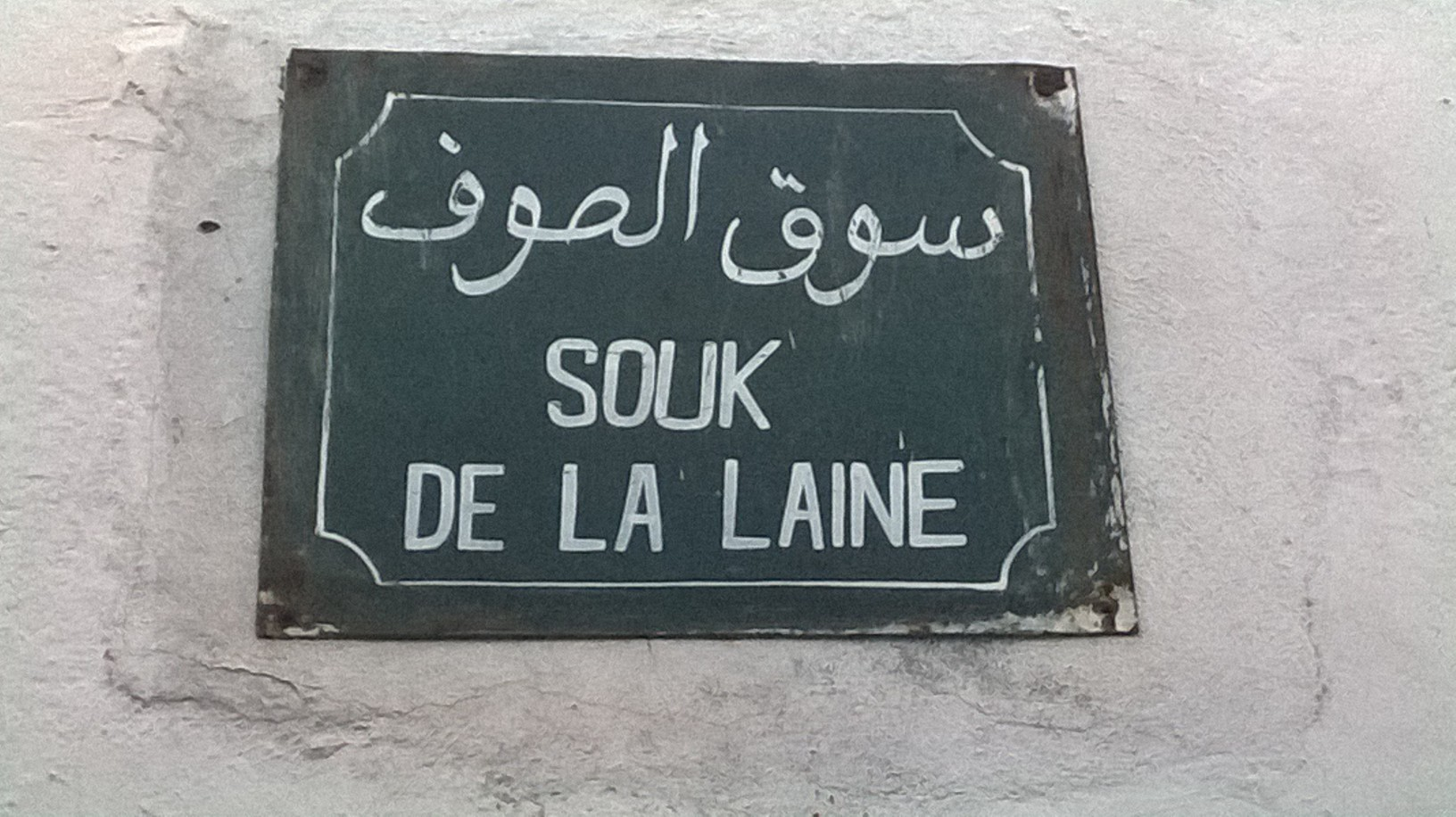
Metallic plaque of souk El Souf

Souk El Souf (Arabic: سوق الصوف) is one of the souks in the medina of Tunis. It is specialized in the selling of wool.

== Location ==
It is located in the south of Al-Zaytuna Mosque, near Souk El Kmach.
