= Fondouk El Attarine =

Historic caravanserai in Tunis, Tunisia

Coordinates: 36.7977°N 10.1718°E

- فندق العطارين
- Interactive map of the Fondouk El Attarine area

General information
- Type: Caravanserai
- Location: Medina of Tunis, Tunis, Tunisia

Fondouk El Attarine (فندق العطارين) is a historic caravanserai in Souk El Attarine in the Medina of Tunis, Tunisia. It operates as a restaurant and local craft gallery.

== History and use ==
The fondouk's origins may date to the Hafsid period. It formerly served the perfume trade as storage and accommodation, and is located in the perfume market near the Al-Zaytuna Mosque. It also accommodated foreign travellers before its later reuse.

After nearly 40 years of closure, it was converted into a restaurant and local craft gallery. The conversion added a transparent covering over the central patio, which is framed by stone walls, arcades and columns. The building retained its central courtyard and two-level galleries during restoration.

Before the conversion, the ground floor was used for storing goods and resting animals, while rooms on the first floor opened from the gallery. The restoration consolidated the structure, rebuilt the floor slab, restored vaults and stone fittings, replaced wooden elements, and enlarged some rooms for exhibition use.
