= Souk Erbaa (Tunis) =

Coordinates: 36.797063°N 10.171360°E

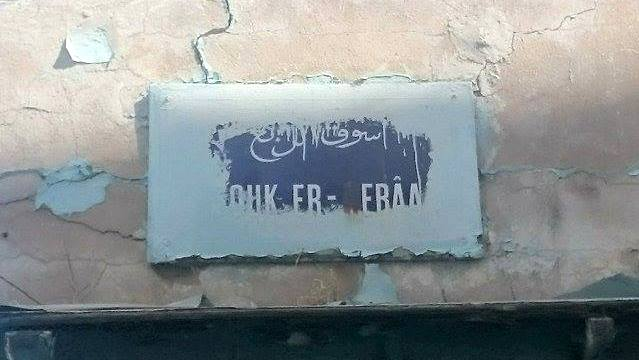
Metallic plaque of Souk Erbaa

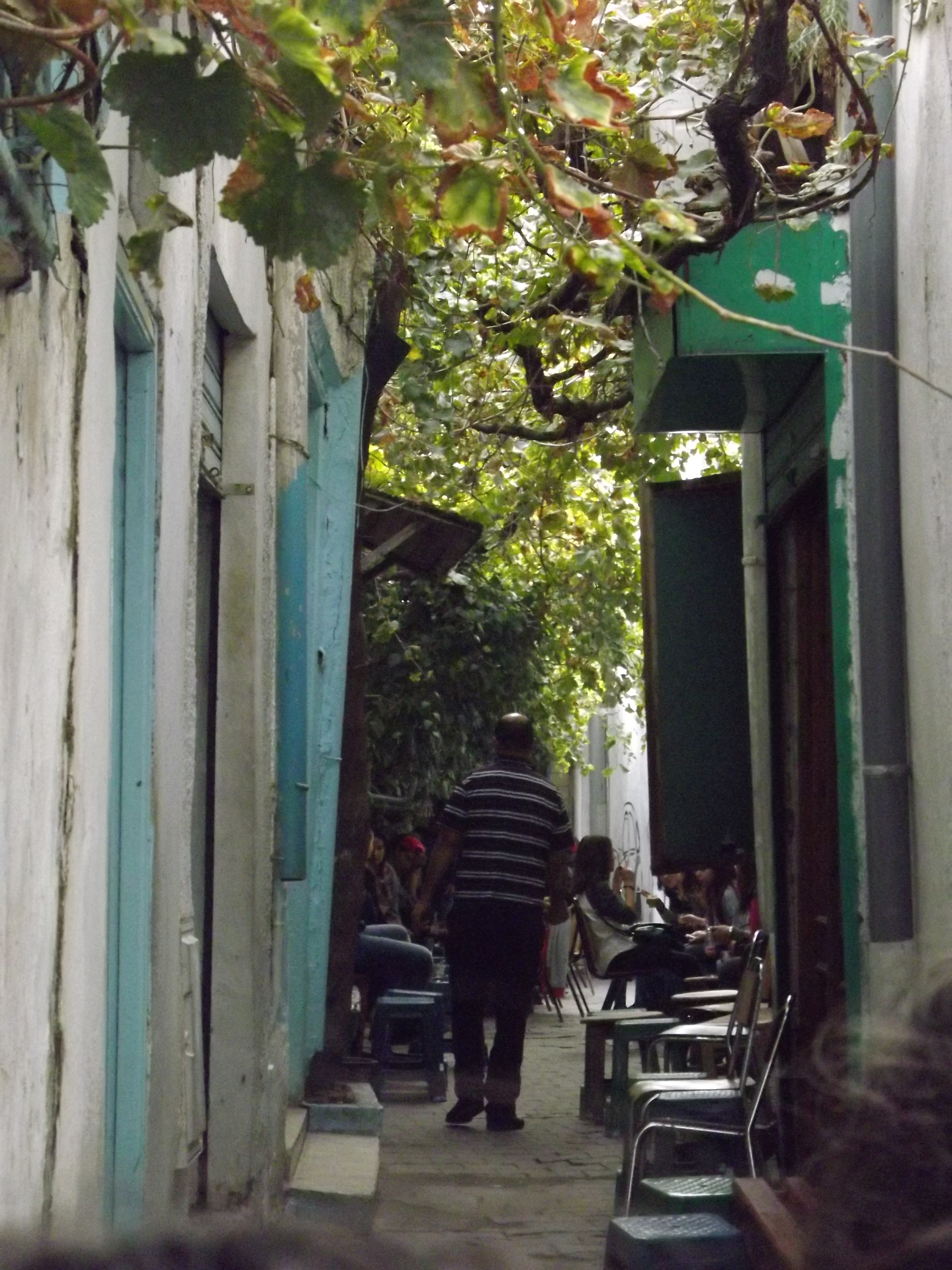
El Enbaa coffee shop in Souk Erbaa

Souk Erbaa (Arabic: سوق الربع) is one of the souks in the medina of Tunis.

== Etymology ==
Some historians say that the souk got its name erbaa or quarter from the fact that the quarter of the incomes in every shop was paid as a tax. Some others believe that this name comes from the word tarbiaa (Arabic: تربيعة) that refers to the position in which the traders of this souk used to sit in front of their shops with their legs crossed.

== Location ==
It is located in the south of Al-Zaytuna Mosque, near Souk El Souf.

== History ==
The souk was founded during the Hafsid era between 1128 and 1535.
