= Souk Erbaa =

Souk Erbaa usually refers to one of the following souqs:

- Souk Erbaa (Sfax) in Sfax, Tunisia
- Souk Erbaa (Tunis) in Tunis, Tunisia
