= Souk El Nissa =

Market in the medina of Tunis, Tunisia

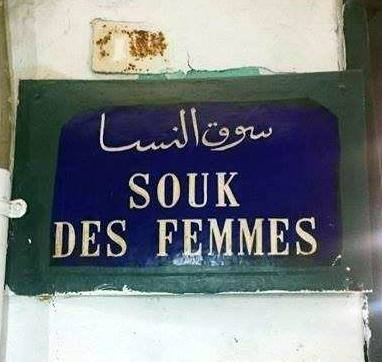
Metallic plaque showing the name of the market

Souk El Nissa (English: Women market) is one of the souks of the medina of Tunis.

== Location ==
This market is located in the heart of the medina, at the south of Al-Zaytuna Mosque, near the souk of wool.

== History ==
The name of this market comes from the fact that women came there for buying and selling some products, like traditional feminine clothes, lace, hijab, etc.

Nowadays, the market isn't specialized in this type of product anymore.
