= Souk El Kammadine =

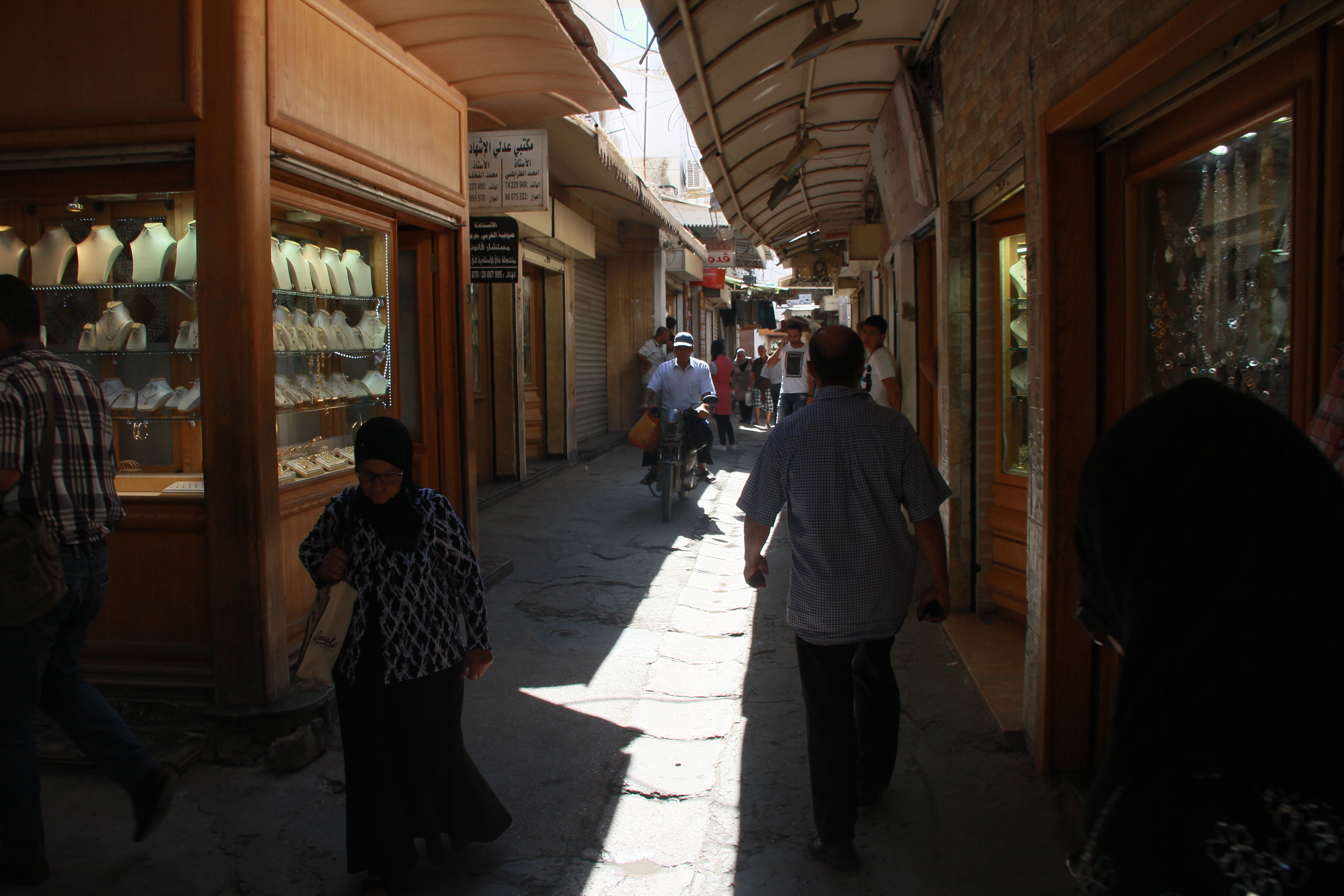
Souk El Kammadine

Souk El Kammadine (Arabic : سوق الكمادين ) is one of the souks (or market) of the medina of Sfax.

== Localization ==
The souk used to be located in Zuqaq El Marr (or Nahj El Bey) but then it was changed to the southern part of path of Adoul. And it used to reach Sidi Ali Karray Street and Rahbet Rmed. It used to have Kaysriyet El Ashr which is now called Kaysriyet El Ayedi.

== Etymology ==
The name Kammadine was derived from the verb Kamada (to poultice) which means to shorten a dress. The poultice is considered one of the most important traditional productions in the medina of Sfax and other towns.

According to El Bakry, in the medieval centuries Souk El Kammadine's artisans were very active and were known for their high quality products.
