= Souk El Blaghgia =

Coordinates: 36.797904°N 10.171243°E

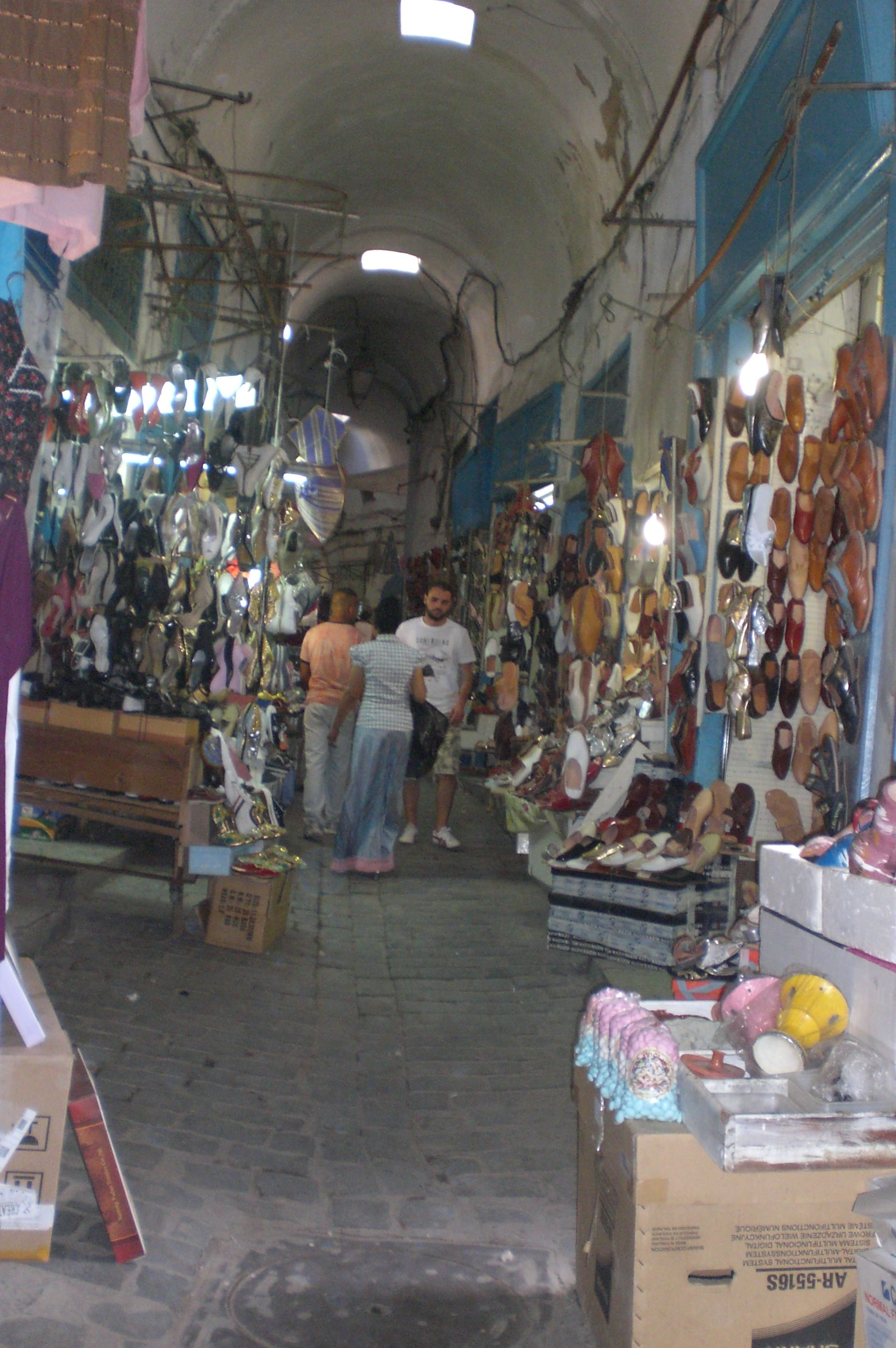
Architecture of Souk El Blaghgia

Souk El Blaghgia is one of the souks of the medina of Tunis.

== Etymology ==
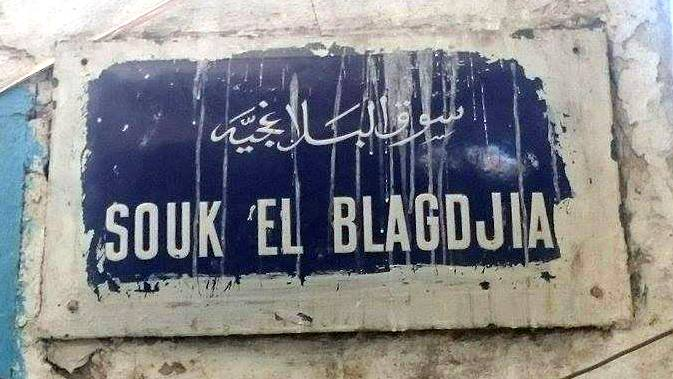
Metallic plaque ofsouk El Blaghgia

Balgha is an Arabic word that refers to a babouche made of leather and which is considered as a part of the traditional clothes in Tunisia and the Maghreb region in general.

== Location ==
The souk is located in the centre of the Medina of Tunis, near Al-Zaytuna Mosque and between Souk El Attarine and the Kasbah Street. It is linked to Foundouk El Blaghgia.

== History ==
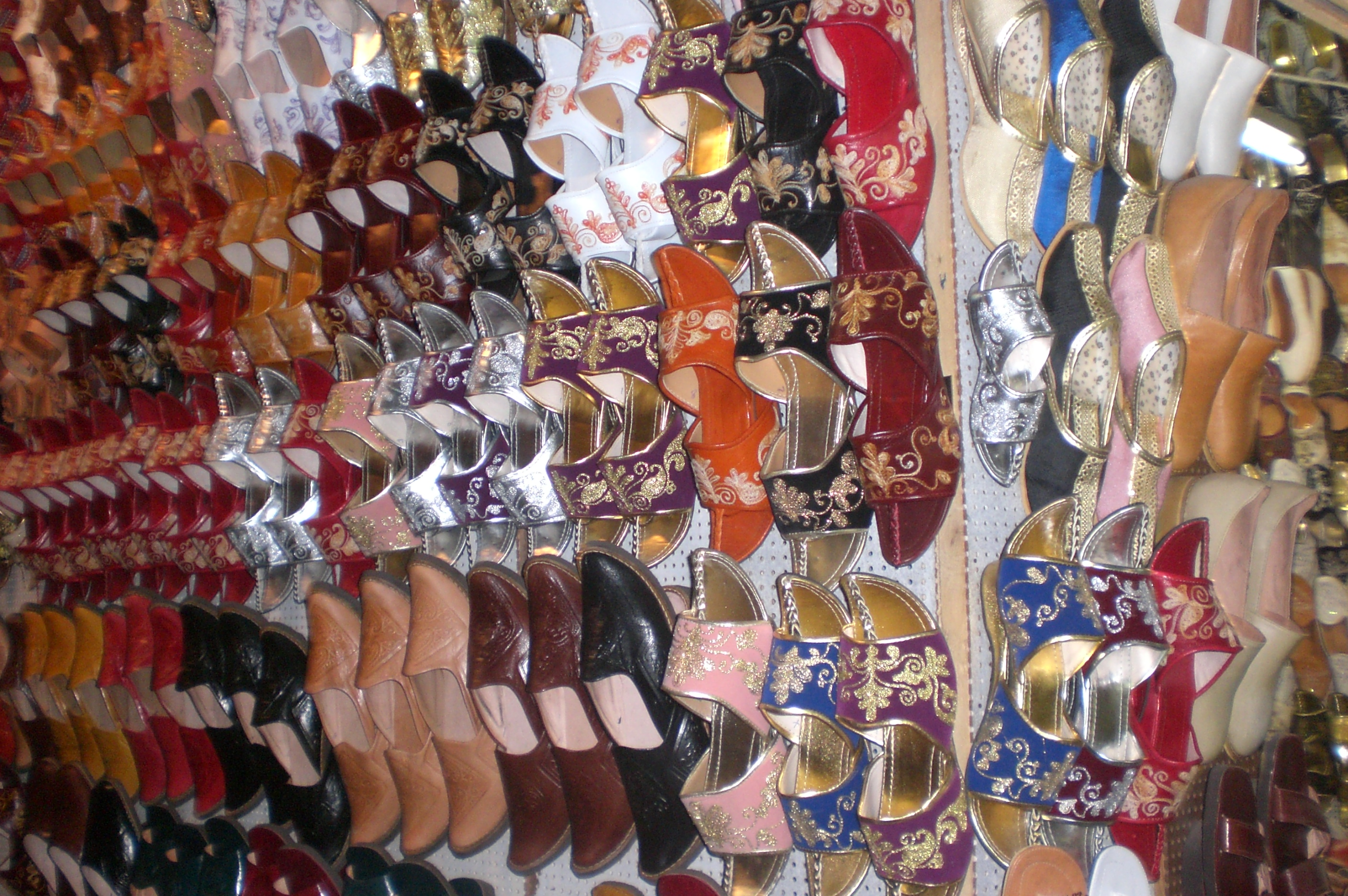
Balghas

It was founded in the 13th century by Abu Zakariya Yahya and then reconstructed again during the Ottoman era between 1756 and 1757.

It was considered during the Husainid reign as one of the most important souks of the Medina of Tunis.

== Architecture ==
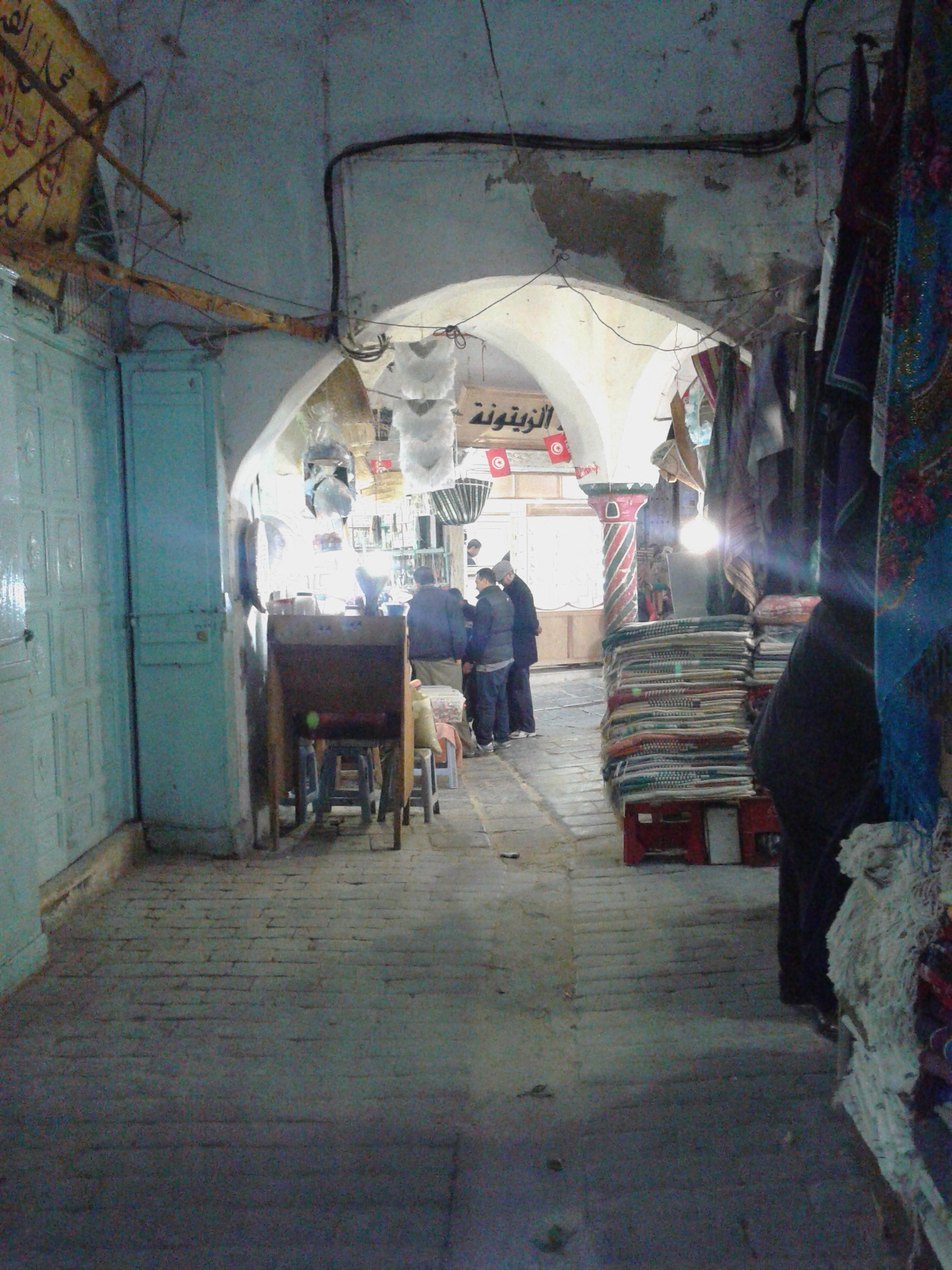
Entrance of the Souk

The whole souk is covered with barrel vaults. Also, it has a covered dead end surrounded by the shops. Nowadays, the souk has more than 70 shops.

== Evolution ==
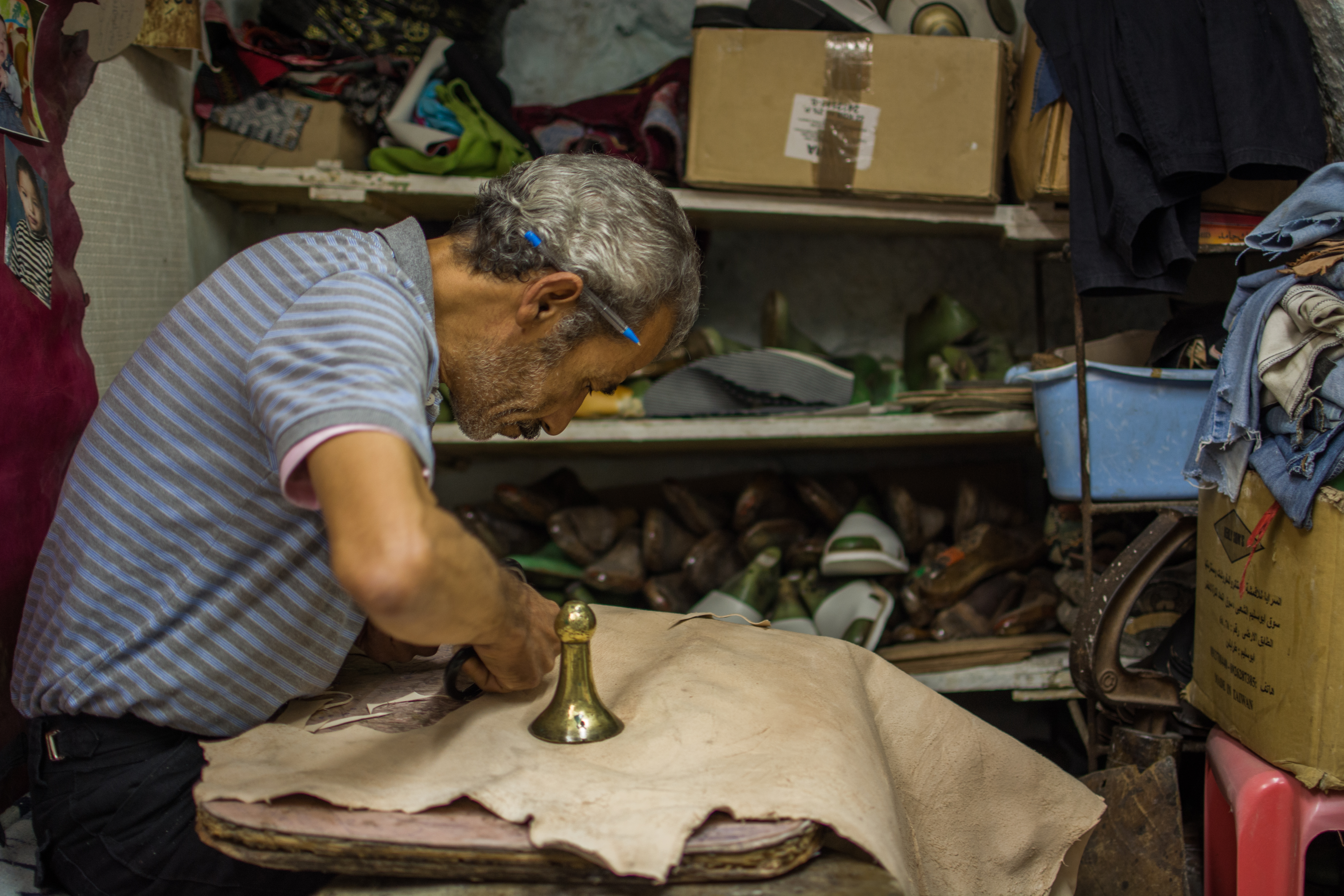
An artisan making a Balgha

Since its foundation, the souk was specialized in producing and selling balghas (traditional men shoes) and chebrella (feminin version of the balgha). Yet, the arrival of european shoes, it started losing its importance.

Nowadays, it is still specialized in shoes selling, but mainly modern ones with updated design for daily use and with a multiples choices for colours to satisfy all tastes.
