= Souk El Attarine =

Spice market in Tunis, Tunisia

Coordinates: 36.7976°N 10.1711°E

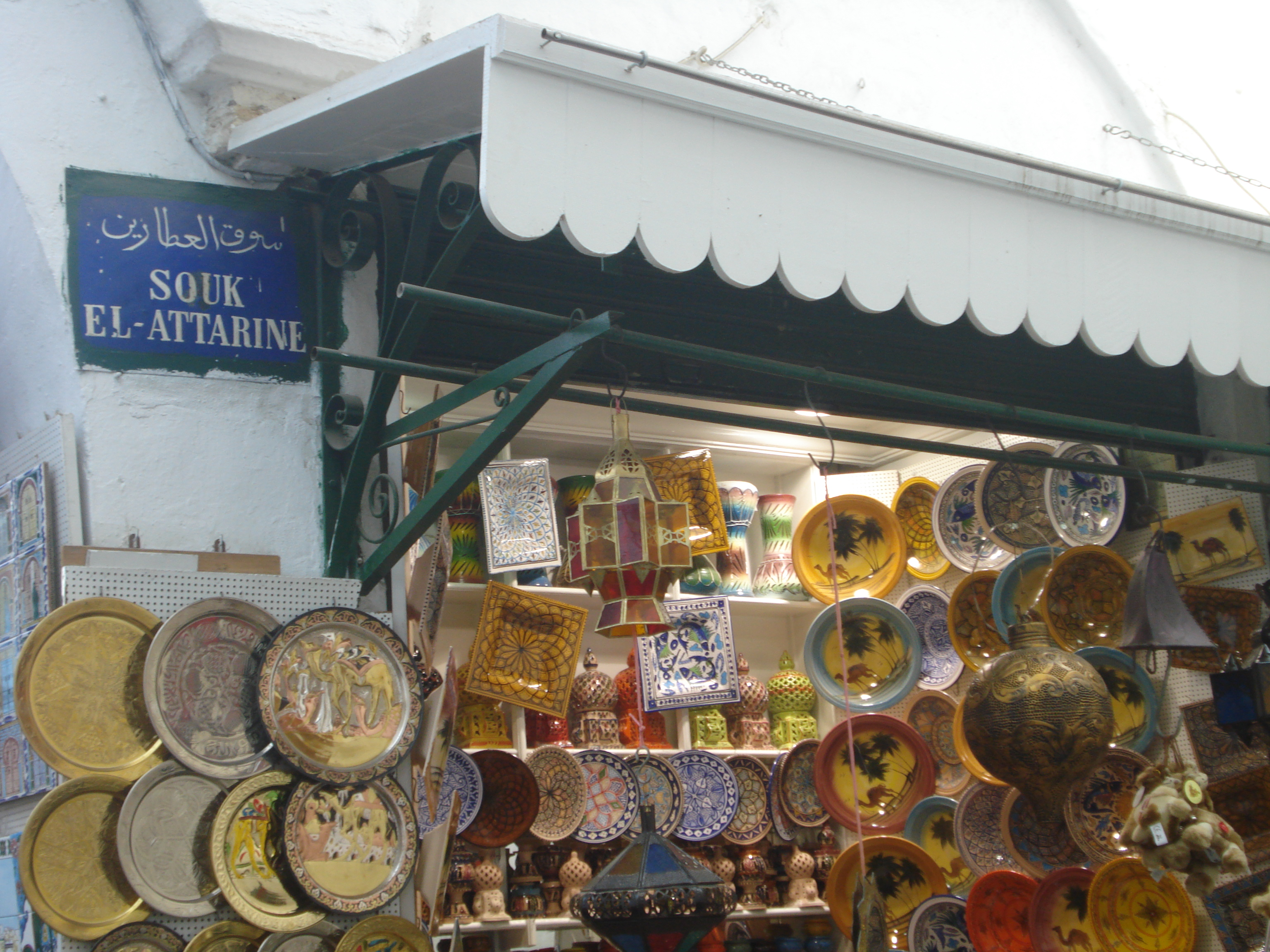
Souk El Attarine sign

Souk El Attarine (Arabic: سوق العطارين), or souk of spice traders, is the name by which most spice markets are referred to in Arab countries in the Middle East. Old cities (Jerusalem, Damascus, Amman, Beirut, Tunis, Marrakach) were often divided into segments based on what was sold - meat, spices, fabrics and so on - and attarine, which means spice traders in Arabic, refers to the spice market.

== History ==
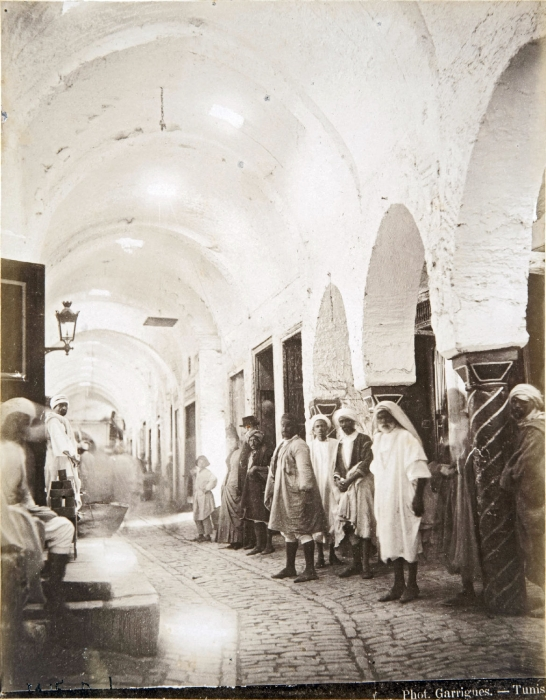
An old photo of the souk

The souk was initiated by a sovereign of the Hafsid dynasty, Abu Zakariya Yahya, in 1240.

== Locations ==
Souk el Attarine is one of the souks of the medina of Tunis, specialized in perfume and beauty products trading. This souk is famous for trading jasmine and rose water as well as amber and henna. Today perfume and beauty products trading is still the main fonction of the souk.

It is situated near the Al-Zaytuna Mosque, facing its northern facade. It can be accessed from the north via the Sieve Street, Souk El Blaghgia and Sidi Ben Arous Street, from the west from Souk El Trouk and from the south by Souk El Fekka.

In this souk, there are a good number of historical monuments such as:

- Al-Zaytuna Mosque;
- Khaldounia;
- Madrasa Al Asfouriya;
- A branch of the National Library of Tunisia;
- Fondouk El Attarine.
- Madrasa Hamzia
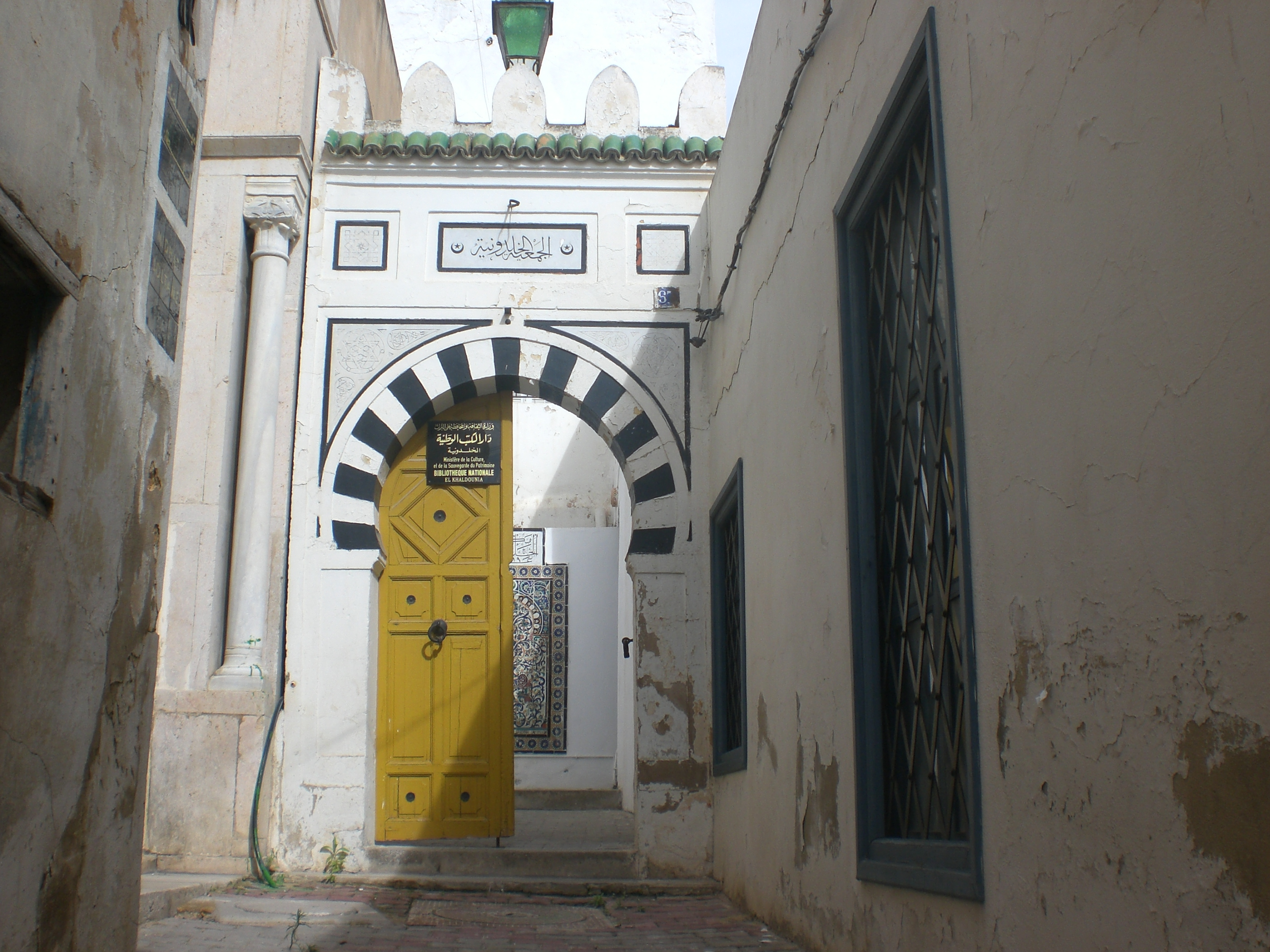
Facade of Khaldounia

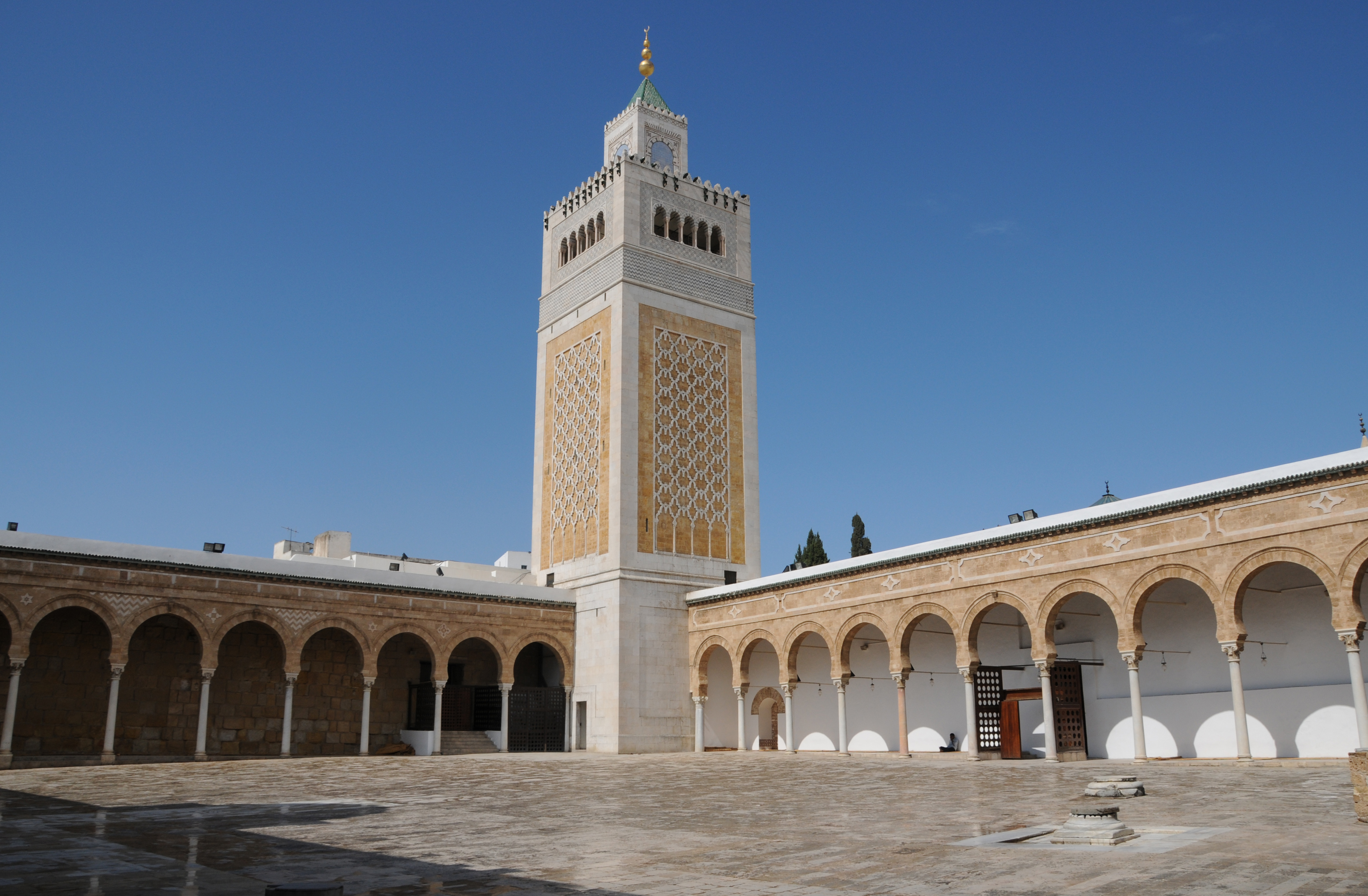
Minaret of the Al-Zaytuna Mosque

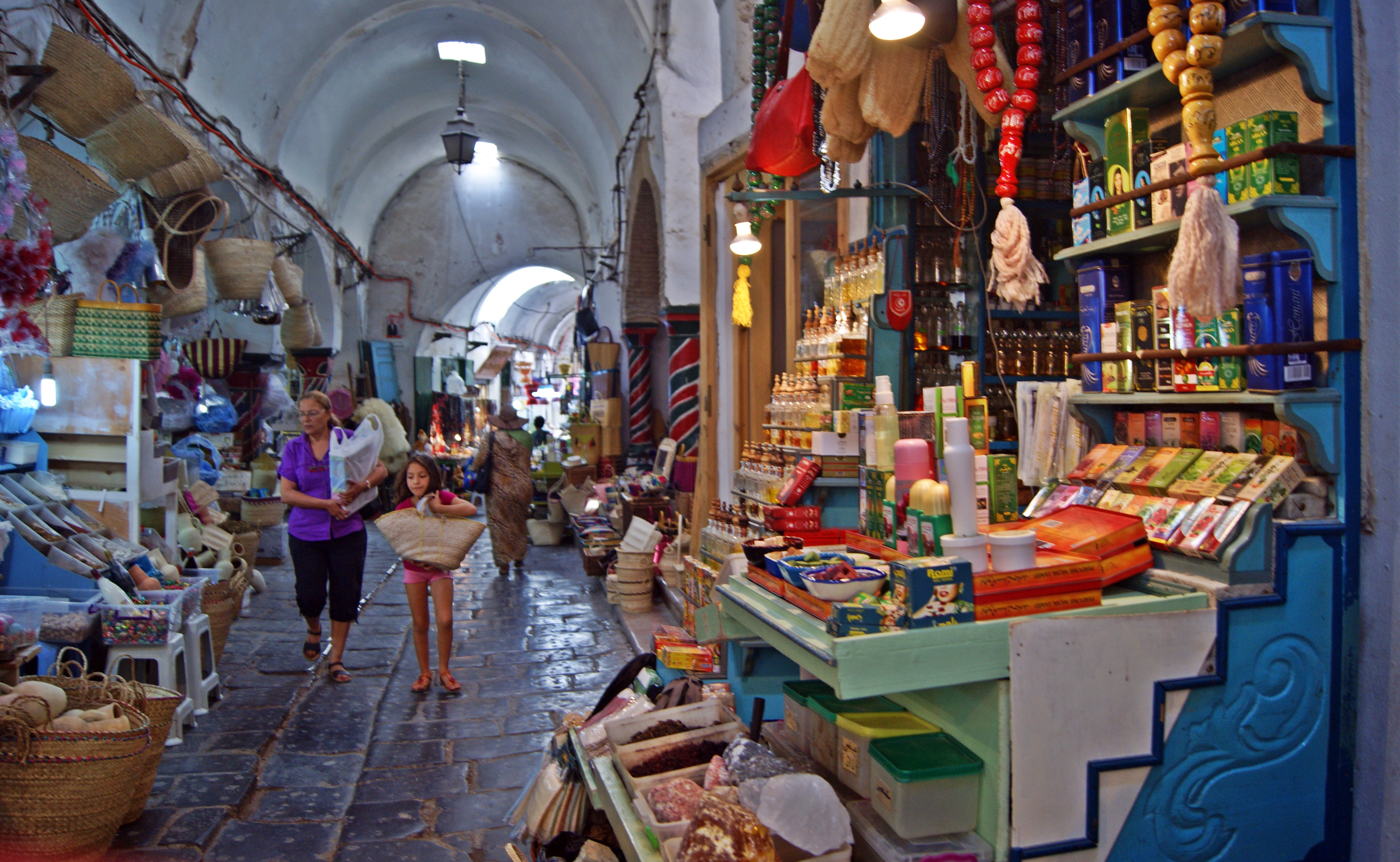
Shops at the souk
