= Souk El Bchemkya =

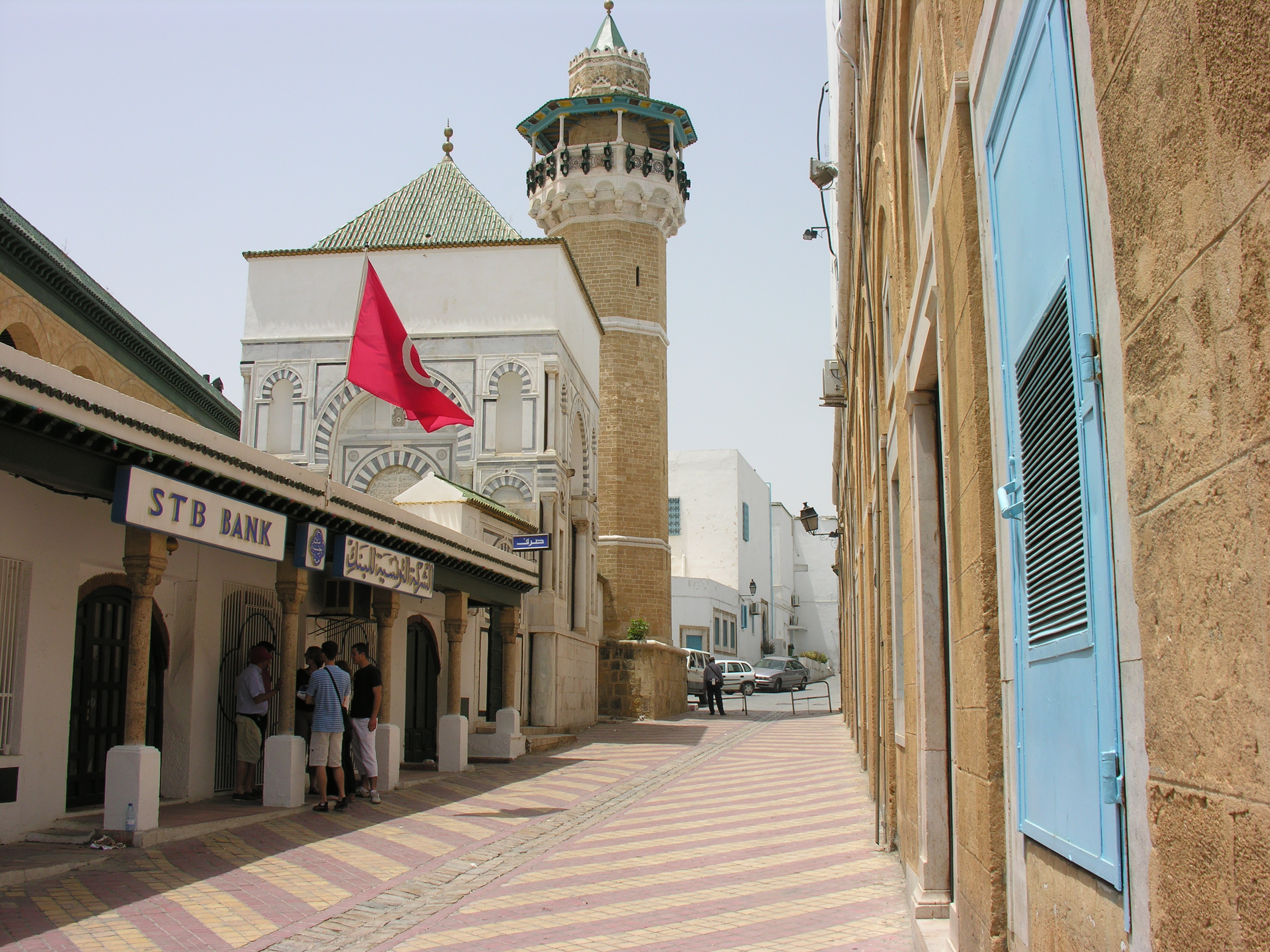
Actual location of the souk.

Souk El Bchemkya is one of the souks of the medina of Tunis. It used to be specialised in selling bechmak (slippers for Turks).

== History ==
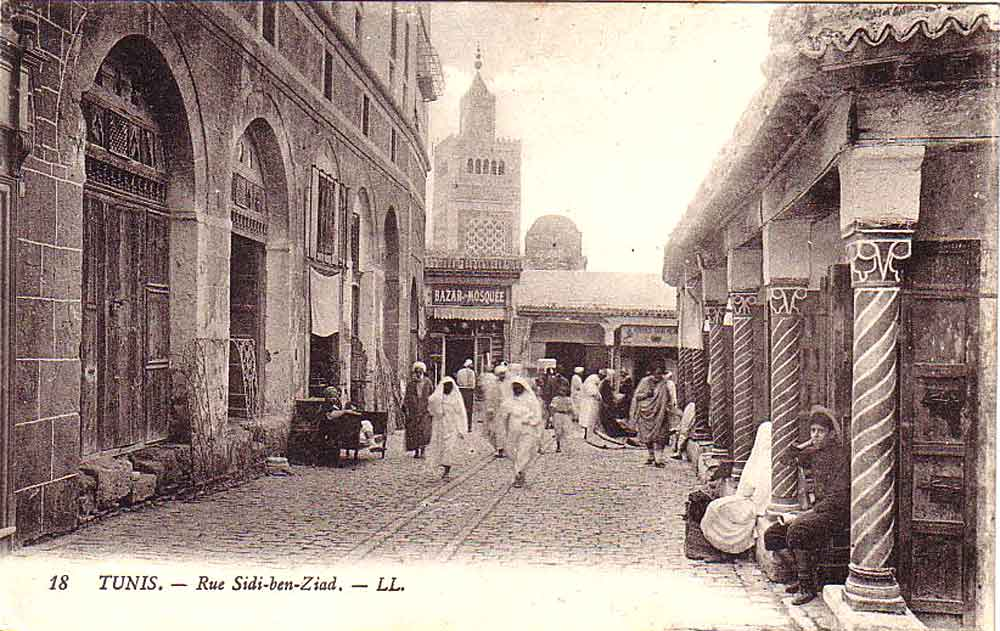
Old picture of the souk.

This souk was built by Yusuf Dey at the same time as his mosque. It is a part of his foundation made up of religious and economic buildings.

After the disappearance of qadis and mudarris (teachers), the guild of manufacturers of bechmak is dissolved, leading to the disappearance of the souk.

== Location ==
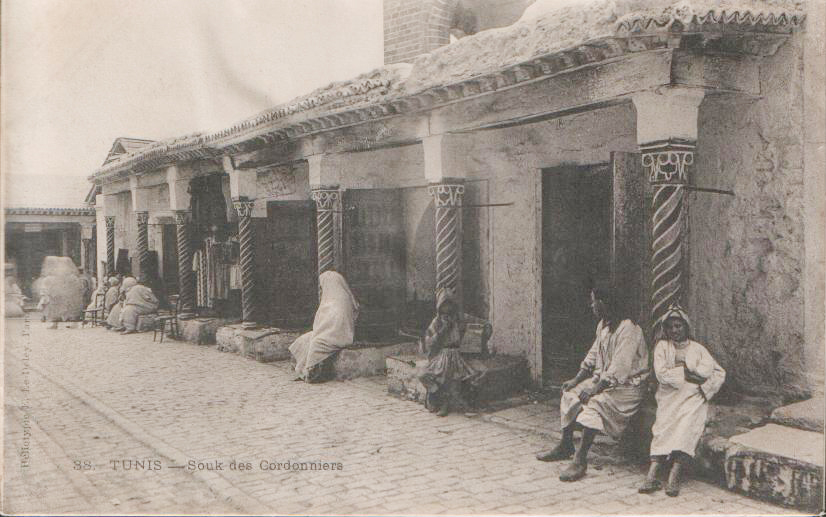
Old view of shops located under the platform of the mosque.

The souk is located near the crossroads of Sidi Ben Ziad Street and Souk El Bey. It surrounds the Youssef Dey Mosque on three sides: east, north and west. Some of the shops are drilled in the platform that carries the mosque.

Nowadays, shops once located on the side of Dar El Bey are annexed to this monument, and those located under the platform are reallocated to other uses, like a bank agency of Société Tunisienne de Banque.

== Products ==
Turkish clothing was introduced with the installation of Turks in Tunisia. The bechmak (pashmak in Turkish) are then new models of slippers or boots worn by Turks.

The yellow bechmak is worn by men, especially fakirs from the Hanafi rite. Women wear different colours.
