= Souq Al Bchamkiya =

Coordinates: 36.7967154°N 10.1698755°E

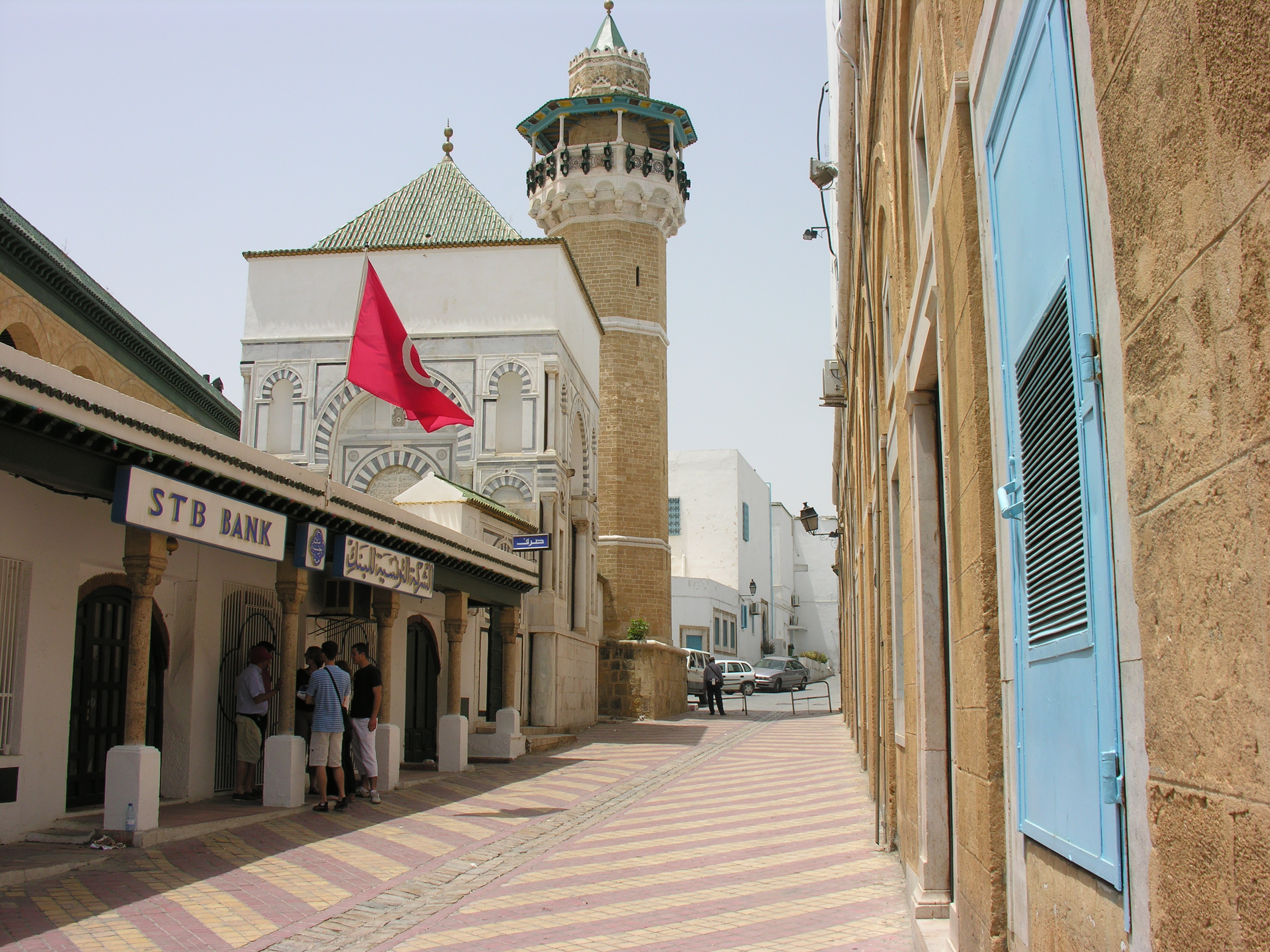
Today's view of Souk El Bechmak

Souq Al Bchamkiya (Arabic: سوق البشامقية) is a former souk of the medina of Tunis, specialized in bechmak (Turkish slippers) trading.

== History ==
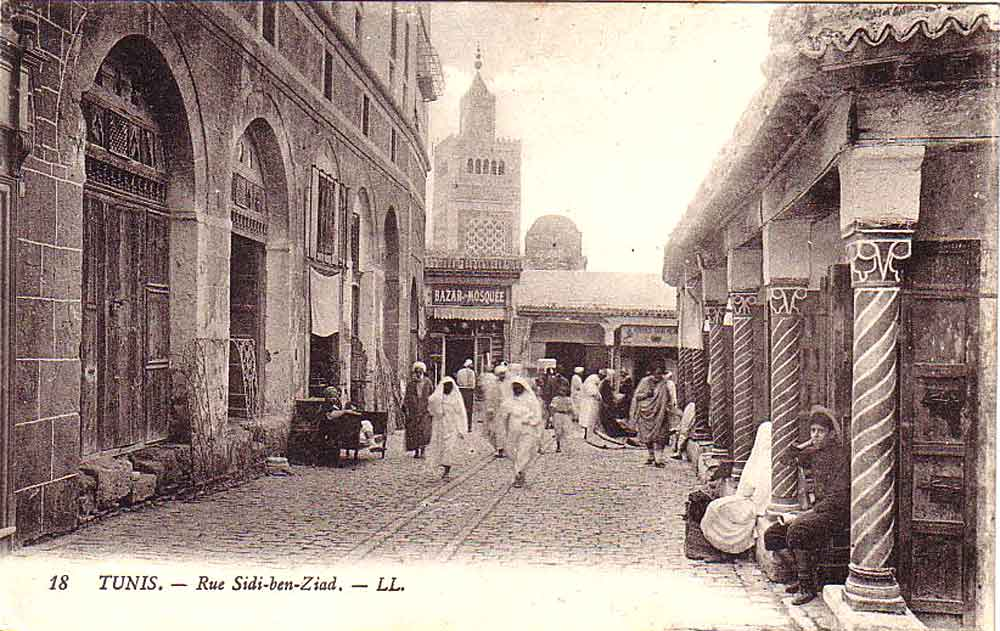
Old view of the souk

The souk was constructed by Yusuf Dey at the same time as his own mosque. It is part of his complex with different building having commercial and religious functions.

With the disappearance of qadis (judges) and mudarris (teachers), the corporation of bechmak craftsmen is dissolved and so did the craft, and its souk.

== Location ==
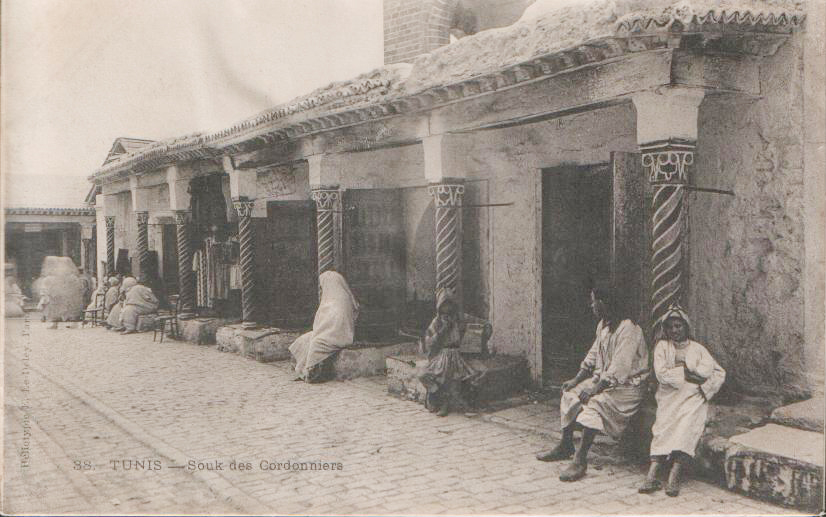
Old view of shops near the Youssef Dey Mosque

The souk is located near the crossing of the Sidi Ben Ziad Street and Souk El Bey. It surrounds the Youssef Dey Mosque from three sides: east, north and west. Some of its shops are placed within the platform holding the mosque.

Nowadays, shops formerly located on the side of Dar El Bey are attached to this monument, and those located under the platform are reallocated to other uses, such as a branch of the Société Tunisienne de Banque.

== Products ==
With the arrival of the Turks in Tunisia, Turkish clothing style was introduced. Bechmak (pashmak in Turkish) were new shoe ou slipper styles worn by Turks.

The yellow bechmak were worn by men, especially judges of the Hanafi Sunni islamic school, while women wore them in various colors.
