= Souk El Dziria =

Coordinates: 36.796755°N 10.169773°E

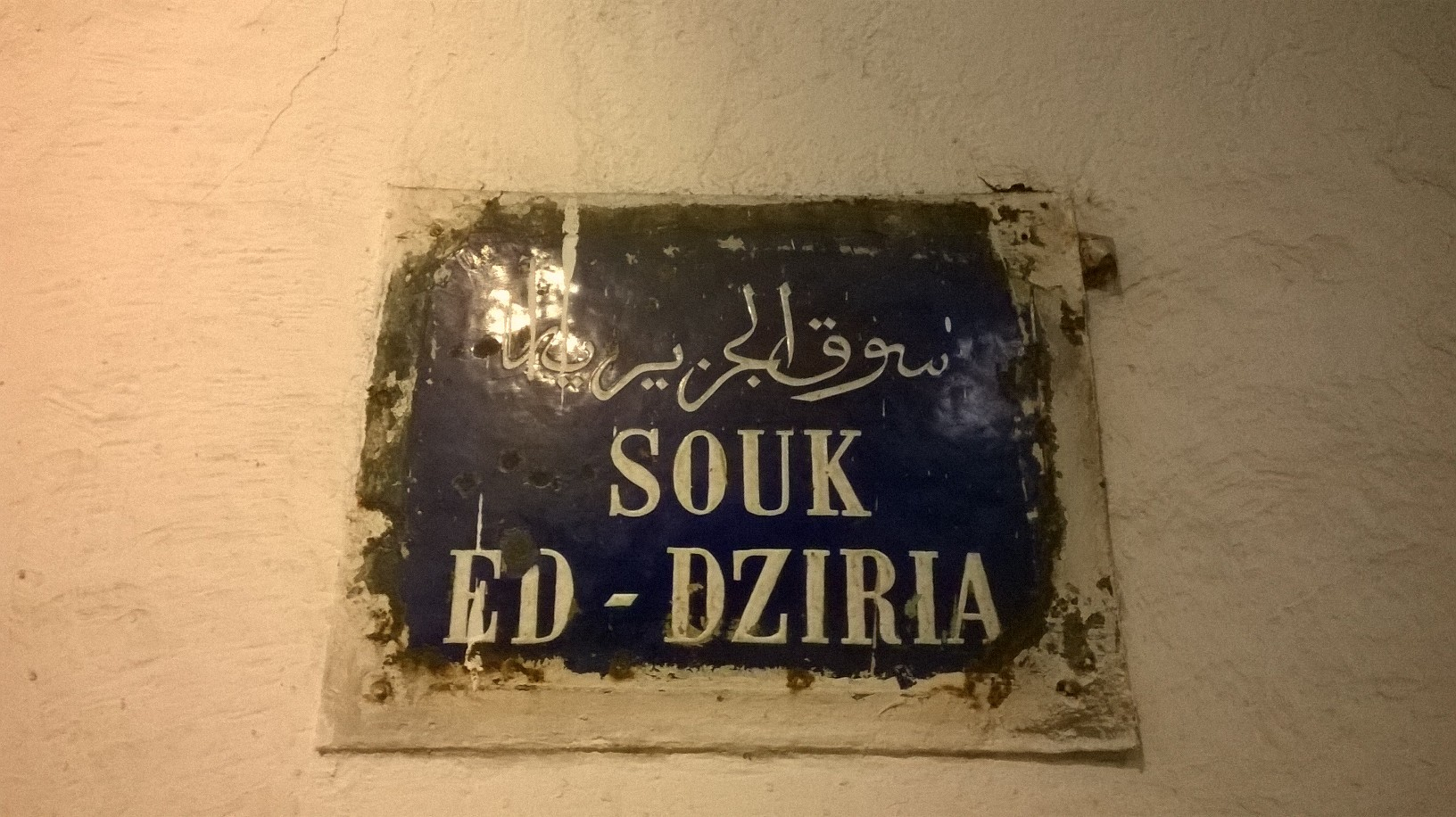
Metallic plaque of Souk El Dziria

Souk El Dziria (Arabic: سوق الجزيرية) or Souk of the Algerians is one of the souks of the medina of Tunis.

== Etymology ==
The origins of the souk's name is not clear. Some historians say Algerian sellers used to work in it while some others believe it was specialized in selling Algerian products.

== Location ==
The souk is located in the east of Al-Zaytuna Mosque. It is a small alley in Souk El Berka. That's why there are jewellery shops in it.
