= Souk El Sagha =

Coordinates: 36.796558°N 10.169612°E

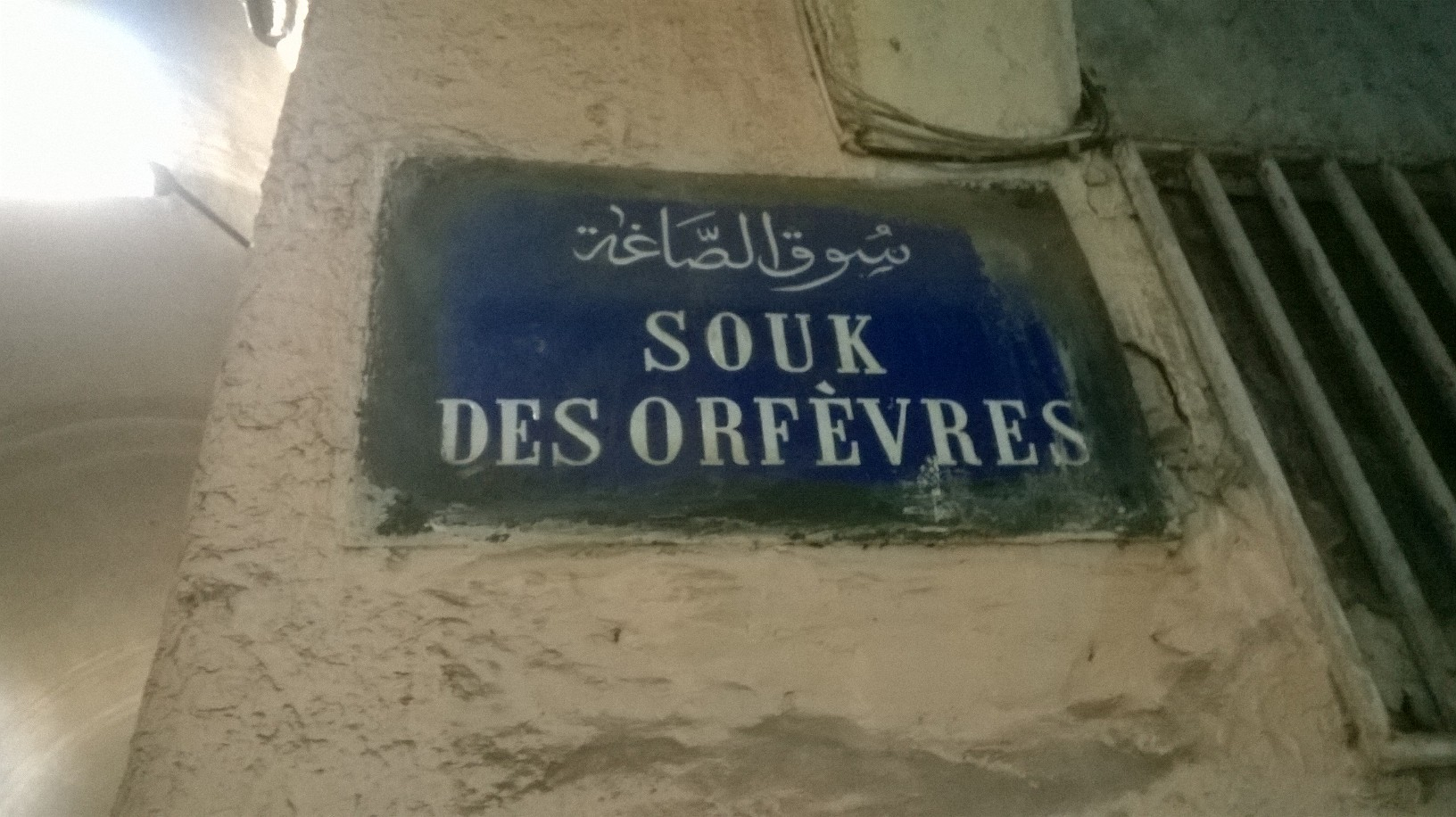
Metallic plaque of Souk El Agha

Souk El Sagha (Arabic: سوق الصاغة) is one of the souks in the medina of Tunis. It is specialized in the selling of gold products.

== Location ==
It is located in the east of Al-Zaytuna Mosque, near Souk El Berka.

== History ==
It was founded during the Hafsid era between 1228 and 1535.
