= Souk El Beransia =

Coordinates: 36.796480°N 10.170524°E

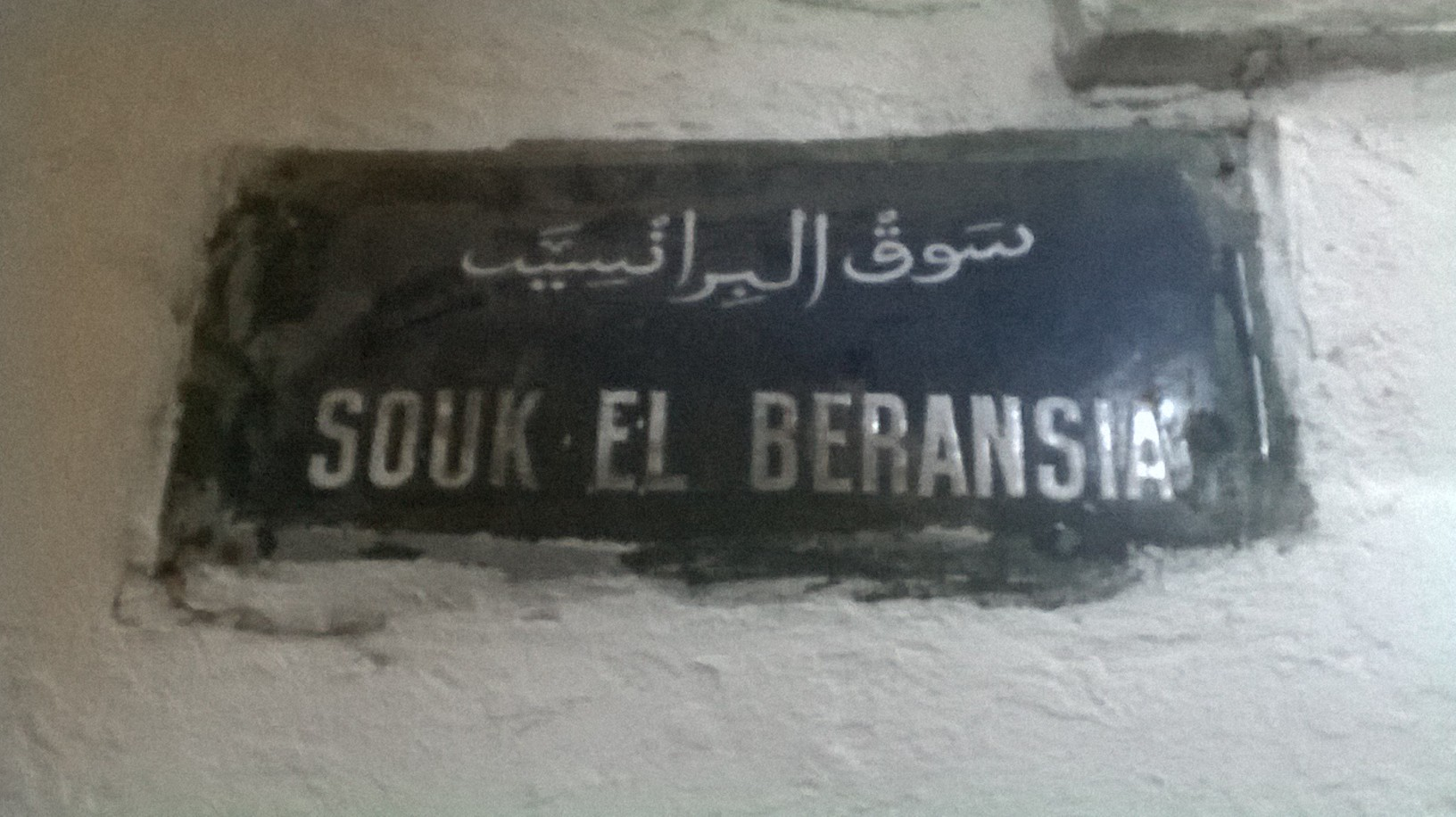
Metallic plaque of Souk El Beransia

Souk El Beransia (Arabic: سوق البرنسية) is one of the souks of the medina of Tunis.

== Location ==
The souk is located in the west of Al-Zaytuna Mosque, near souk El Berka.

== Products ==
It is specialized in selling Burnus, a long traditional wool coat with Berber origins.
