= Souk Ech-Chaouachine =

Souk Ech-Chaouachine is one of the souks of the medina of Tunis. Divided into three parts, it is specialized in chachia trading.

== History ==
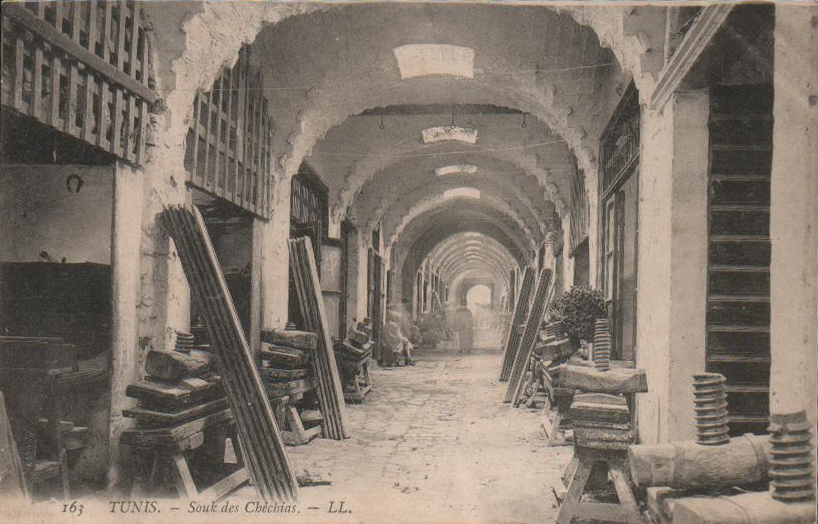
Old picture of Souk Ech-Chaouachine.

According to the chronicler Al Wazir Al Sarraj, Mohamed Bey El Mouradi ordered the construction of the souk in 1691–1692, following the great push that Moorish migrant artisans gave to chachia production and trading at the beginning of the 17th century. The chachia artisans, called chaouachis, were mainly of Andalusian origins, and initiated from the start one of the most important artisan guilds in the country. Their profit generating business was practiced exclusively in Tunis, and followed an important production process and artisan hierarchy, headed by an amine, as all other traditional crafts.

== Location ==
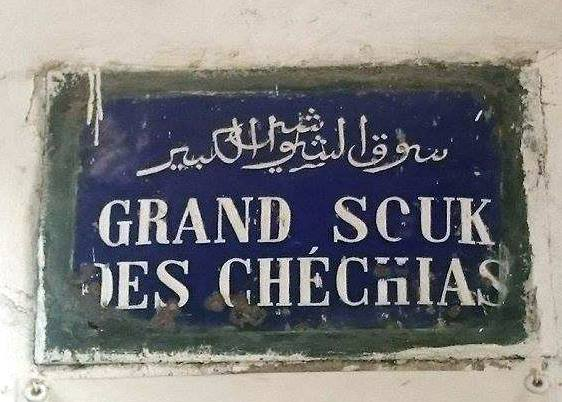
Metallic sign indicating the Great Chaouachine Souk

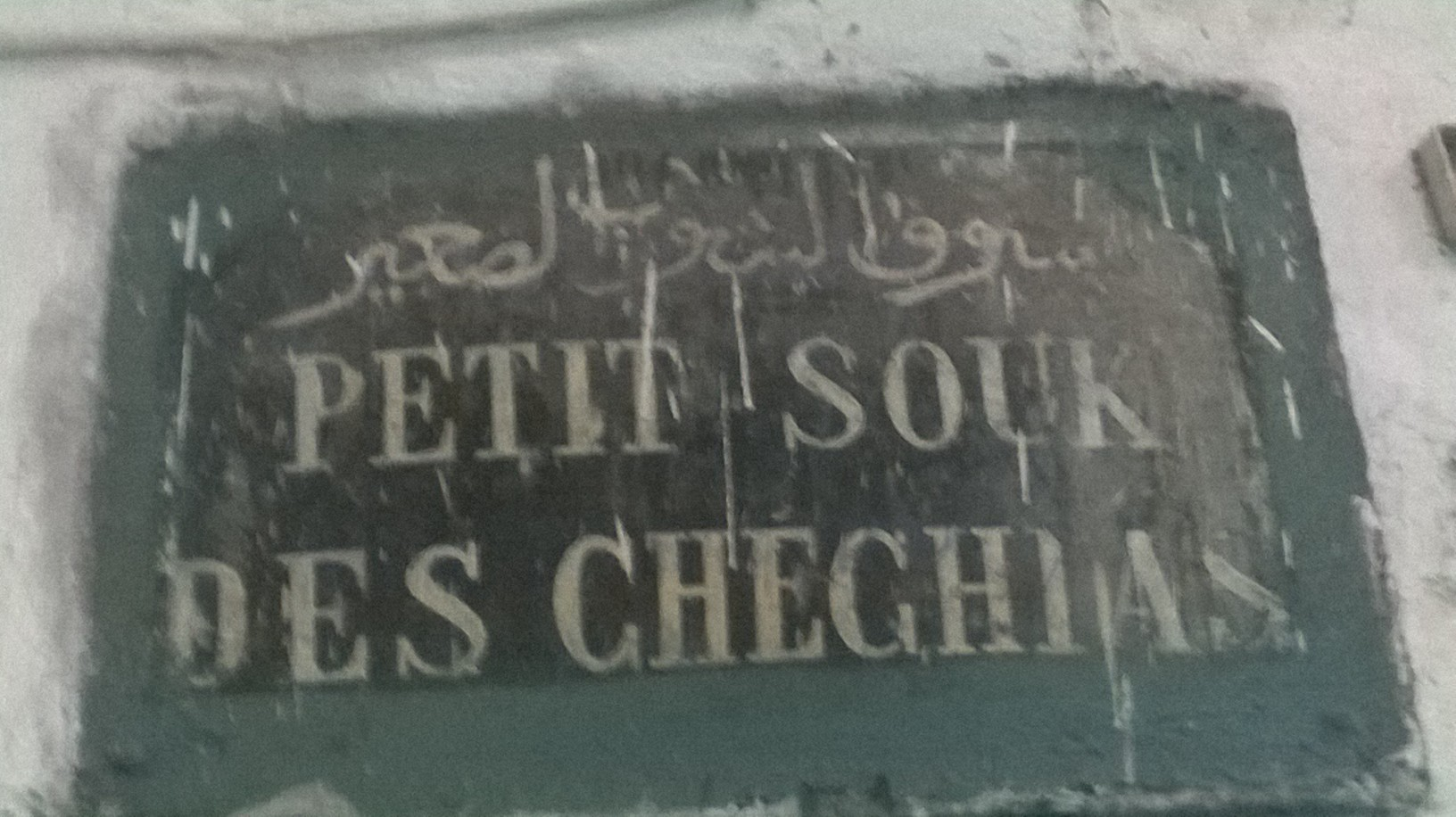
Metallic sign indicating the Small Chaouachine Souk

The souk is divided into three parts: Souk El Hafsi on Kasbah Street, Small and Great Chaouachine Souks both located between Sidi Ben Arous Street and Souk El Bey, near Dar El Bey.

== Products ==
As its name indicates, Souk Ech-Chaouachine is specialized in the production and selling of chachia, a boiled wool red colored men's headwear, with blue or black glans to make it more luxurious. Chachia production requires more than two months which includes several steps from crochet all the way to finishing; only the dying and the finishing production steps are executed at the souk.

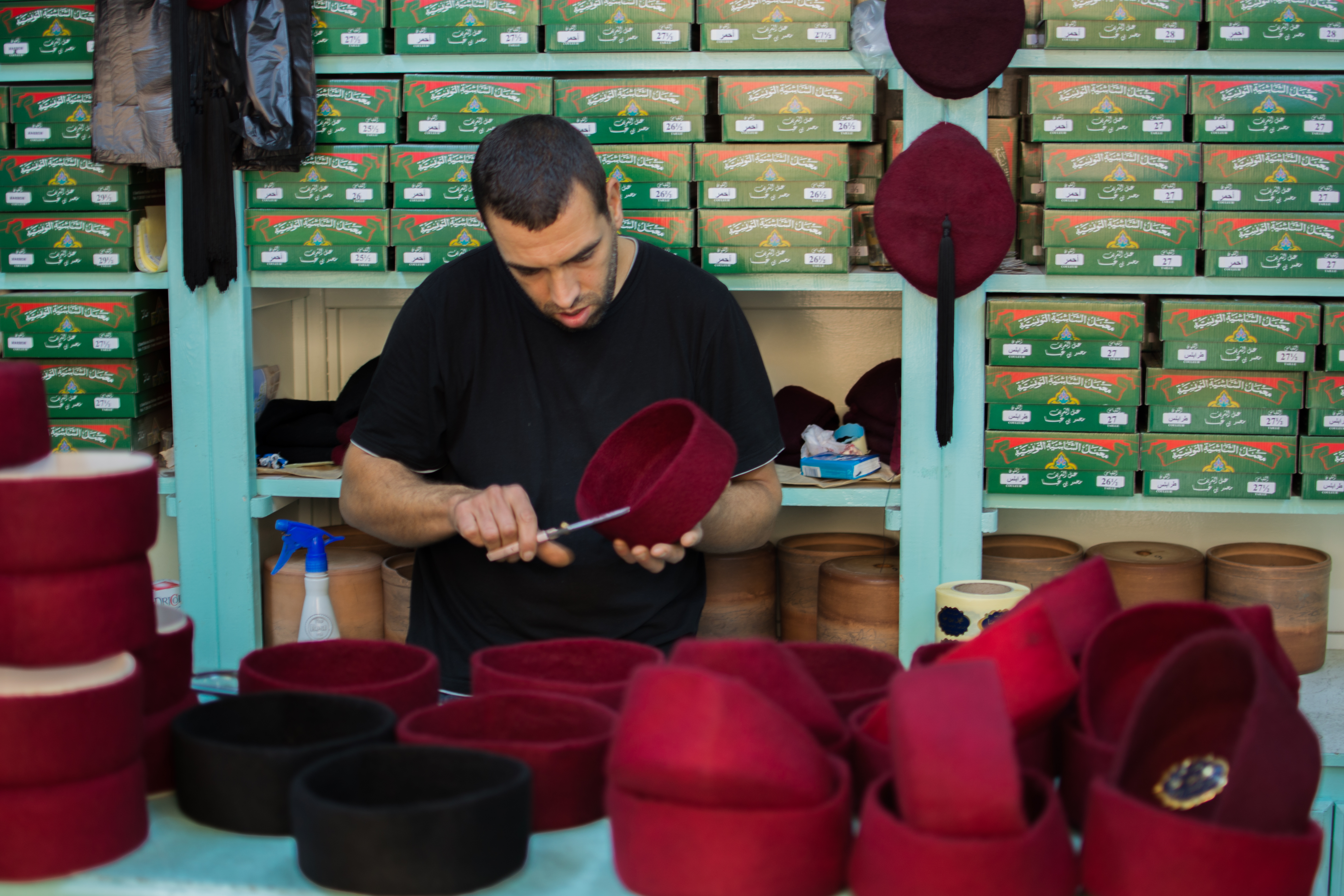
A chaouachi finishing a chachia.

At the chachia workshops situated within Souk Ech-Chaouachine, artisans and apprentices sit on wooden benches leaning on workshop walls, the master artisans sitting behind a counter to meet customers.
