= Société Tunisienne de Banque =

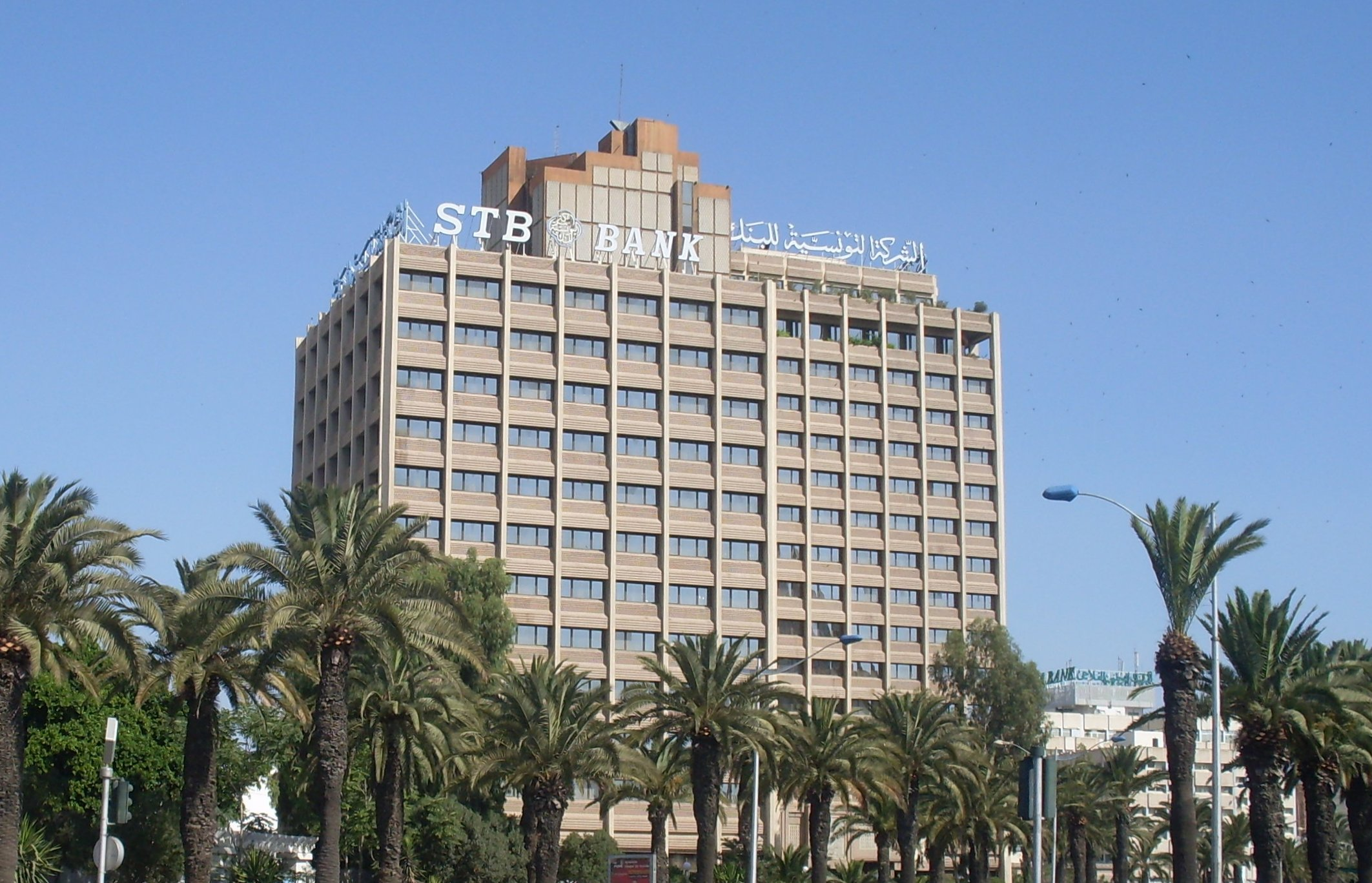
Société Tunisienne de Banque's headquarters

Société Tunisienne de Banque is a state-controlled bank in Tunisia. It is listed in the Bourse de Tunis. It has 124,300 million dinars in assets. The participation in the bank's capital is as follows: public and semi-public sector (52.5%), private sector (36.2%) and foreign actors (11.3%).

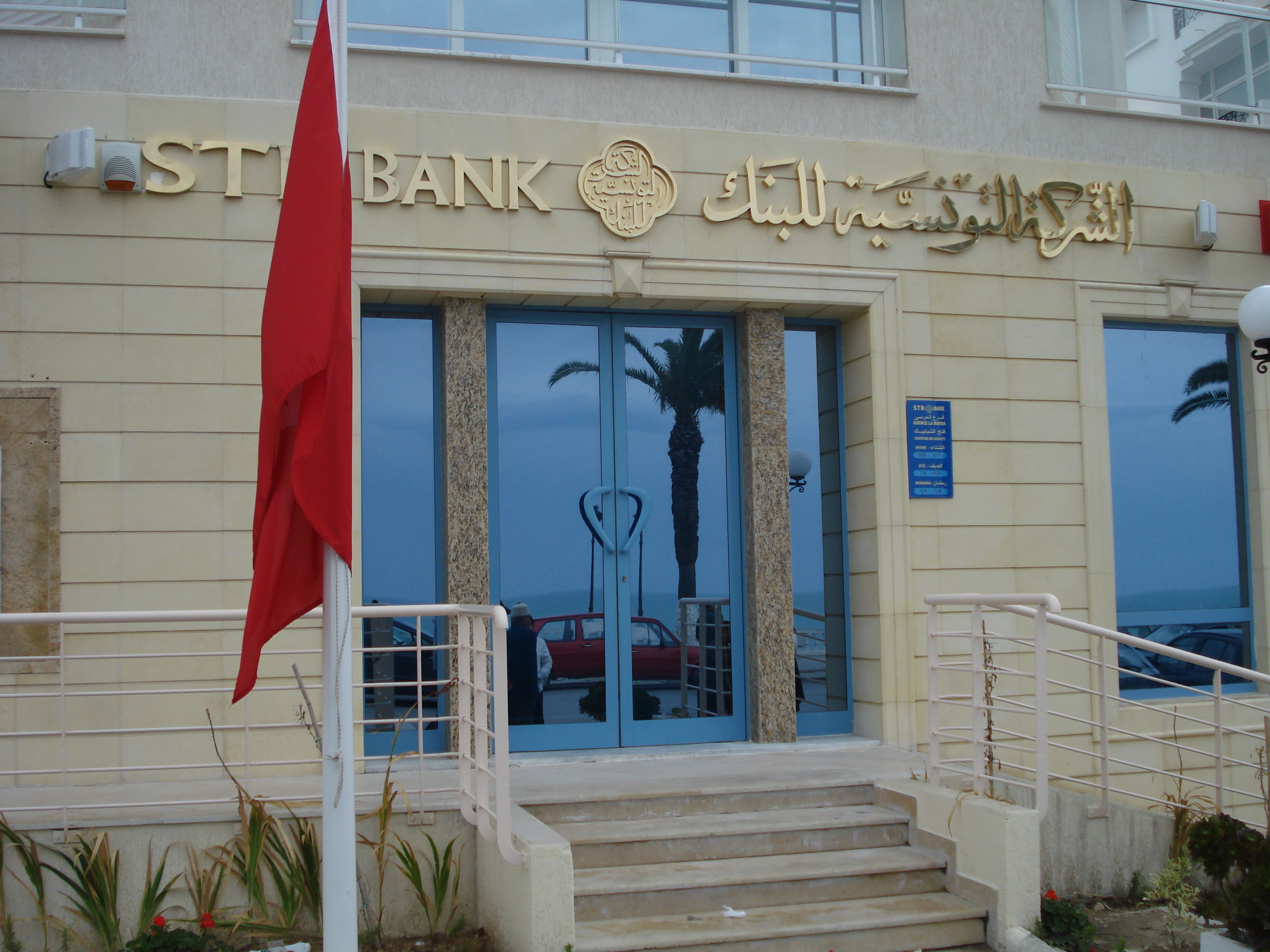
Branch in La Marsa

== Overview ==
Société Tunisienne de Banque was founded in 1958. It is headquartered in Tunis, Tunisia.

The STB holds a 25% stake in the Société Nigérienne de Banque, which operates in Niger and Benin.

In December, STB became the first bank in North Africa to achieve Swift GPI (Global Payment Innovation) status.
