= Souk El Bey =

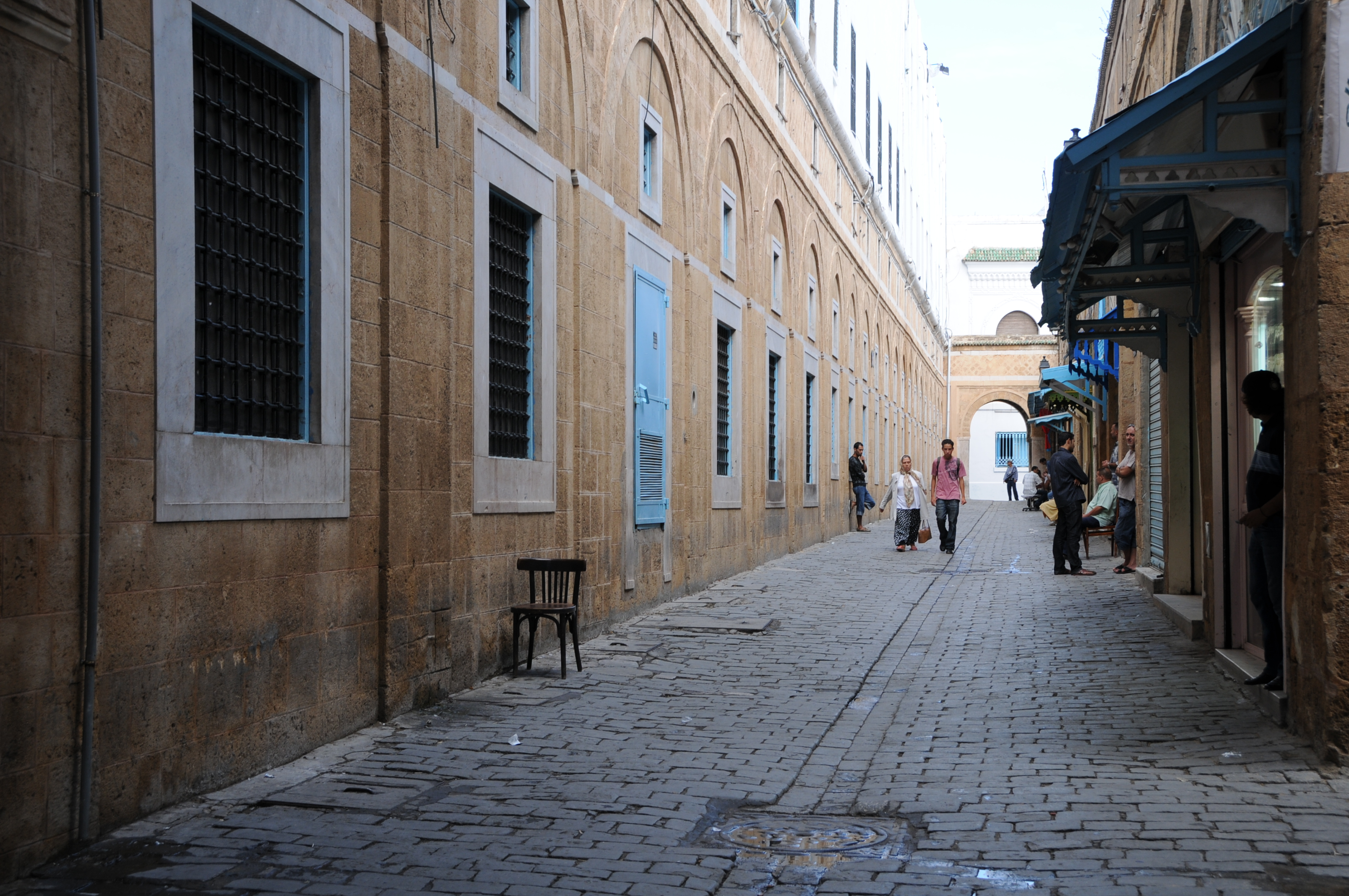
Entrance to the souk.

Souk El Bey is one of the souks of the medina of Tunis.

== Location ==
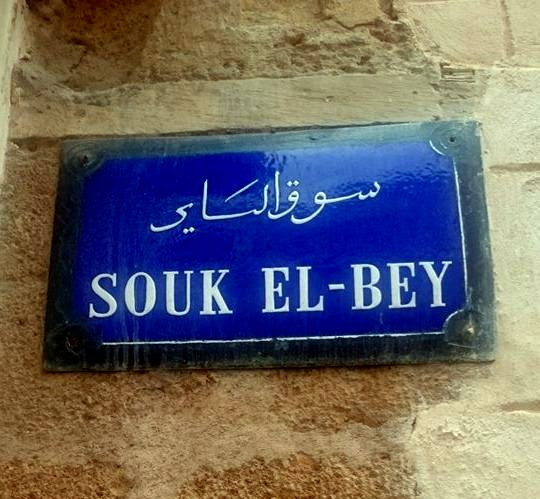
Souk's metallic sign.

The souk is near Souk El Berka, Souk Ech-Chaouachine as well as Dar El Bey, which is where the government center is located.

== History ==
Initiated by Hammuda ibn Ali, it is specialized in trading carpets as well as silk textiles and chachia which was the most important industry in the 19th century.

== Products ==
Today most traders deal in jewellery and precious stones.
