= Youssef Dey Mosque =

17th-century Ottoman-Turkish mosque in Tunis, Tunisia

- جامع يوسف داي
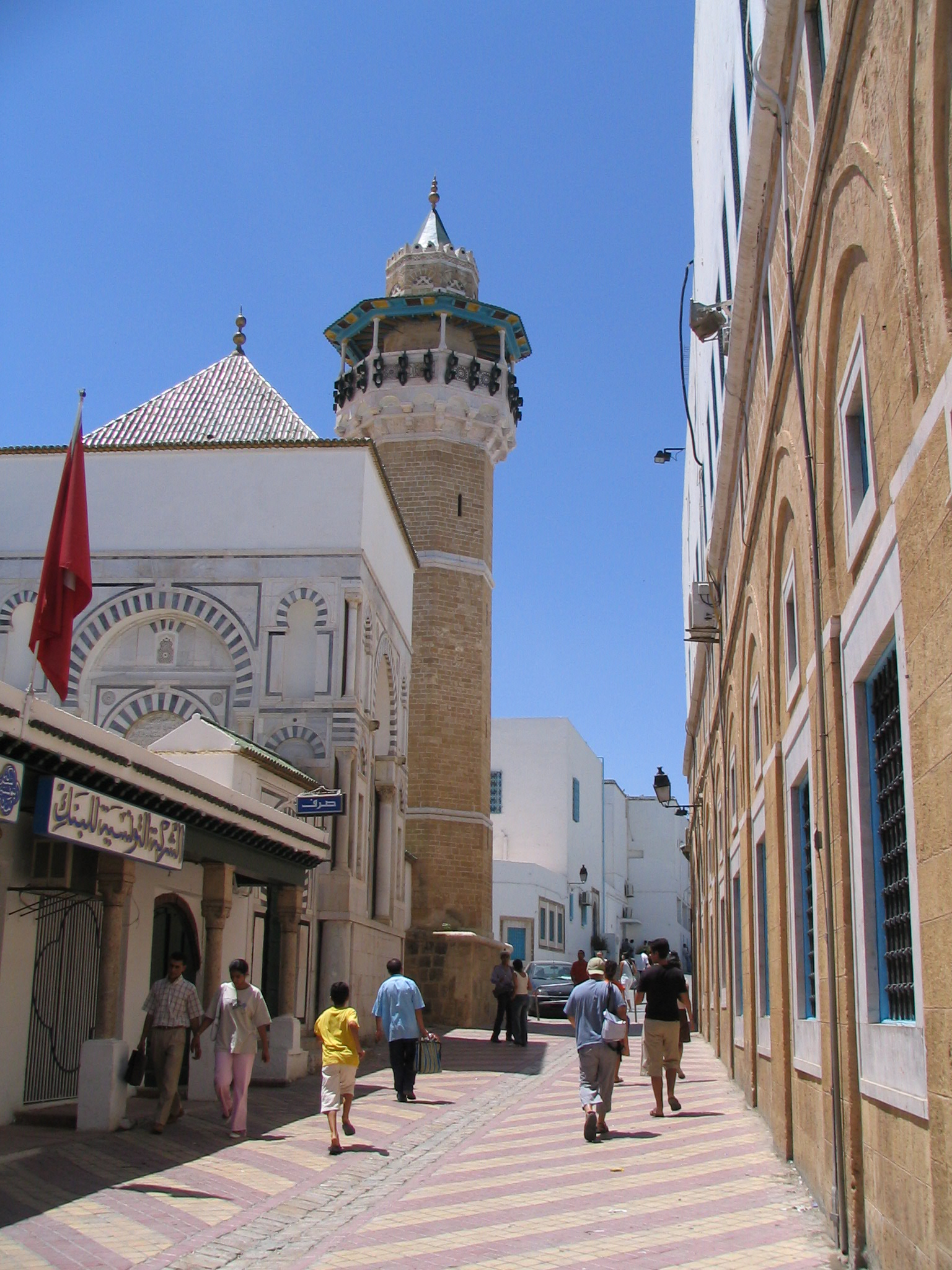

Religion
- Affiliation: Sunni Islam
- Status: Active

Location
- Location: Medina of Tunis, Tunis
- Country: Tunisia
- Interactive map of Youssef Dey Mosque
- Coordinates: 36°47′49″N 10°10′10″E

Architecture
- Architect: Ibn Ghaleb al-Andalusi
- Type: Mosque
- Style: Ottoman
- Founder: Yusuf Dey
- Established: 1612

Specifications
- Dome: 1
- Minaret: 1
- Minaret height: 25 m (85 ft)

Youssef Dey Mosque, also known as Al B'chamqiya, is a 17th-century mosque in Tunis, Tunisia, located in Medina area of the city. The mosque is considered significant as it was the first Ottoman mosque to be built in Tunis.

An official Historical Monument, it operated primarily as a public speaking venue before becoming a real mosque by Youssef Dey in 1631. At the time it was the 11th mosque to be built in the capital. In the late nineteenth century it underwent extensive restoration, ordered by Ali Bey. A decree in 1926 saw the mosque become an annex of the University of Ez-Zitouna.

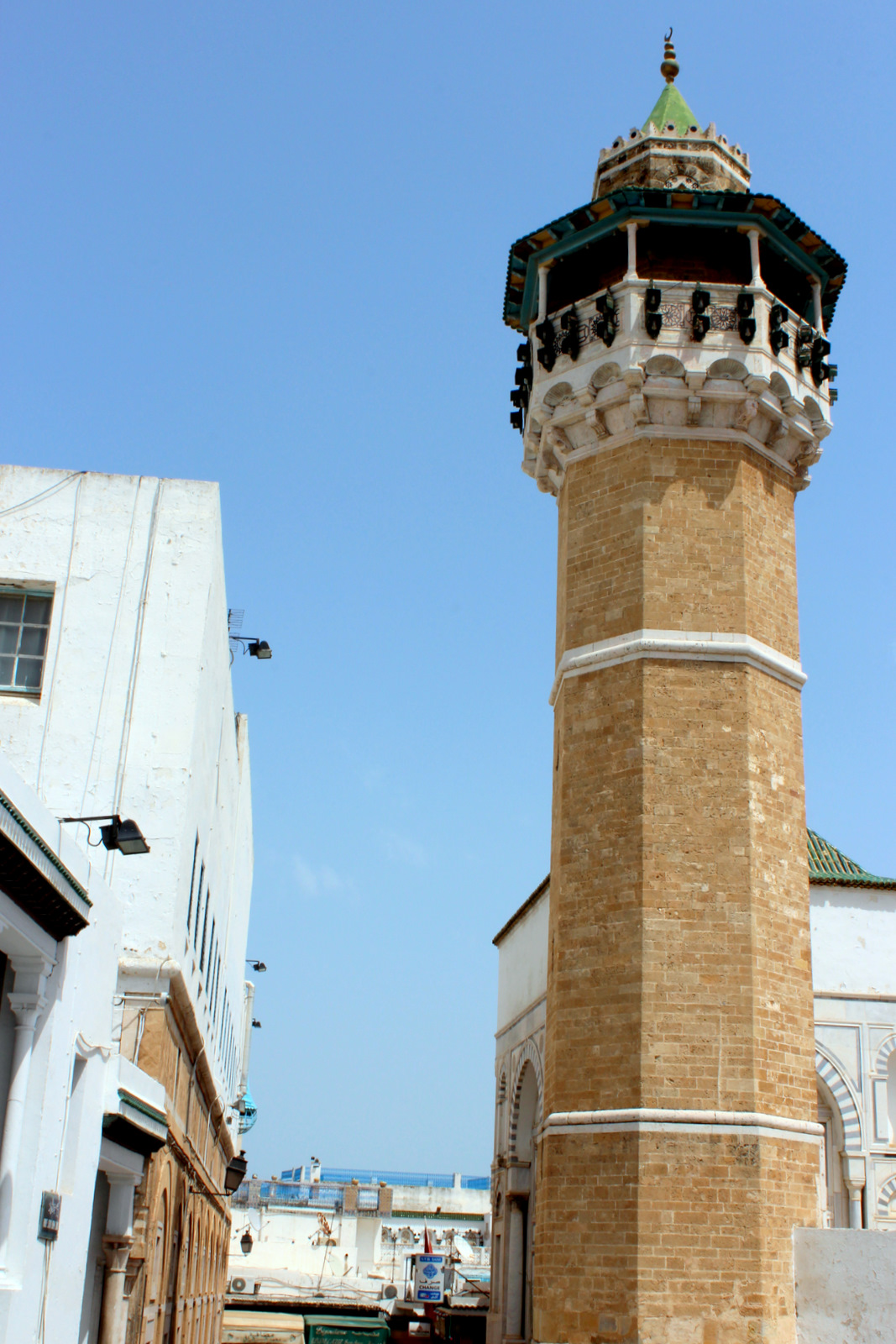
Minaret

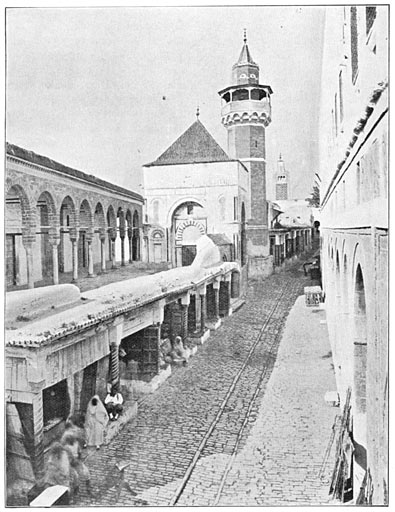
Beginning of the 20th century

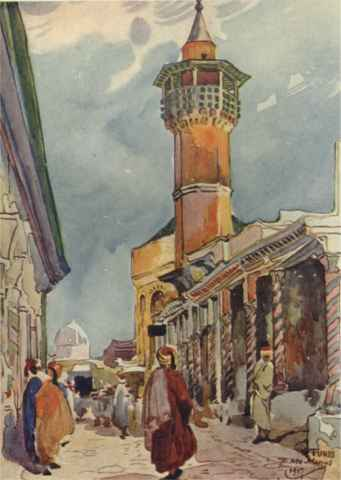
Youssef Dey Mosque in 1908

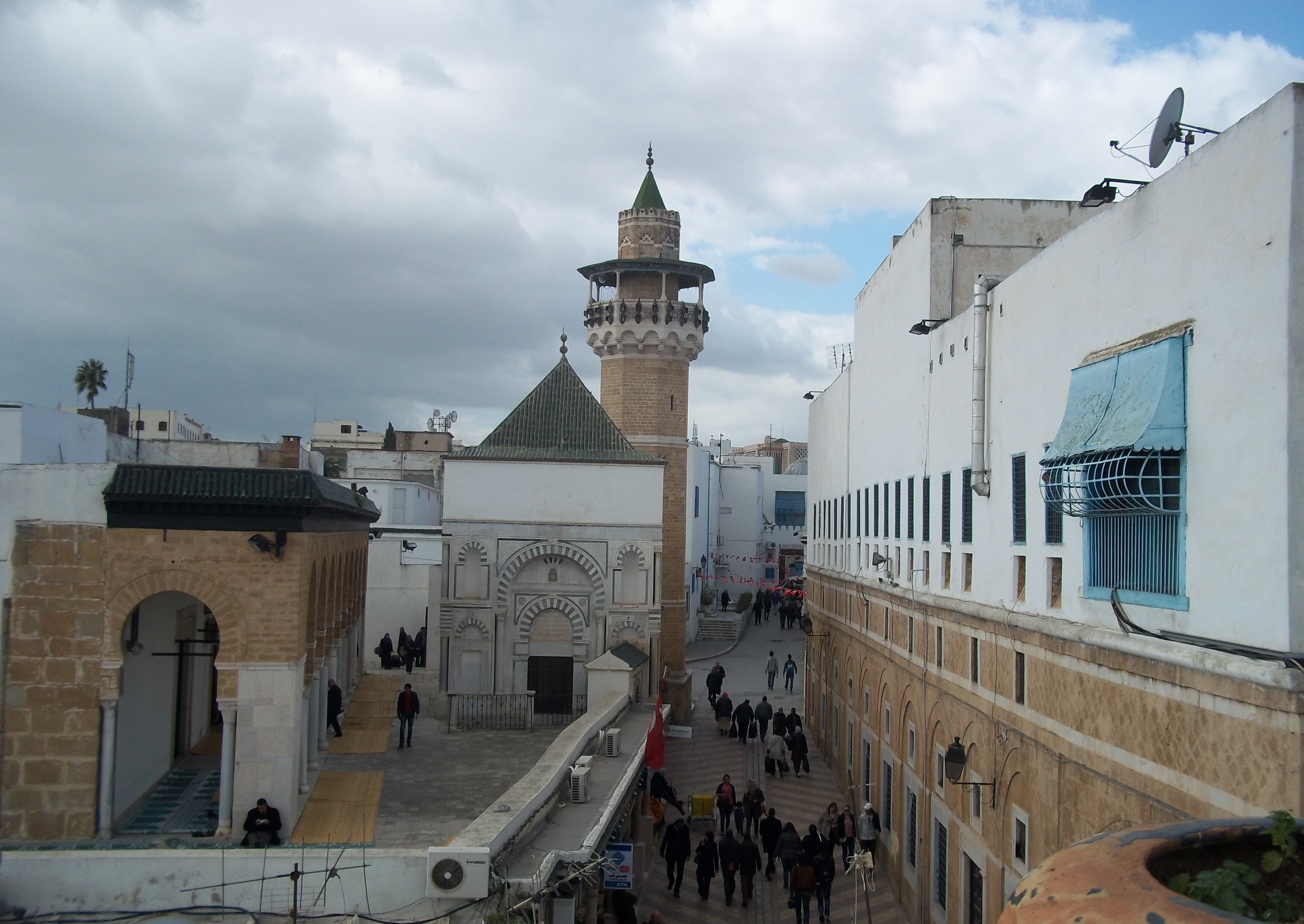
External view

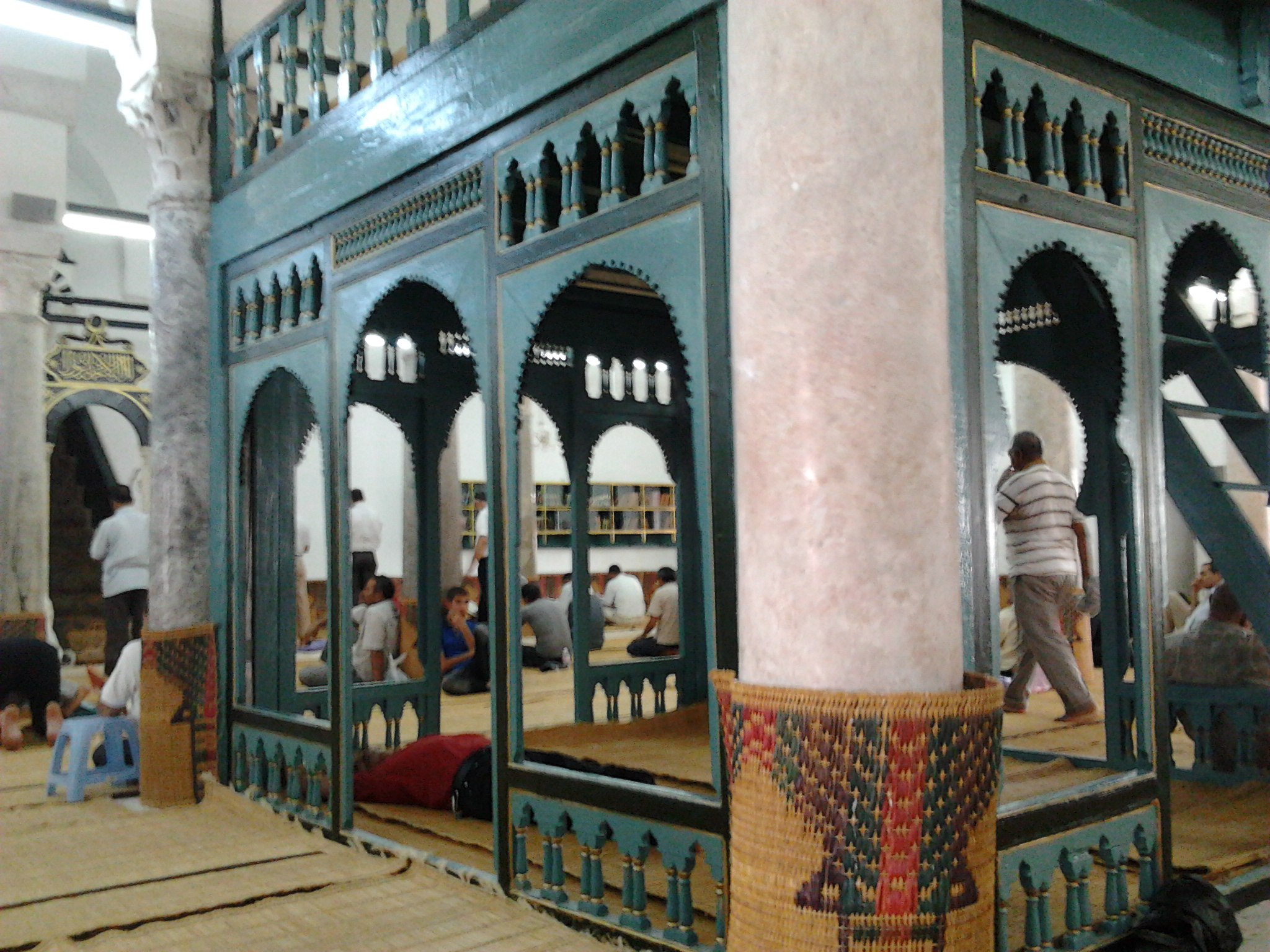
Internal view

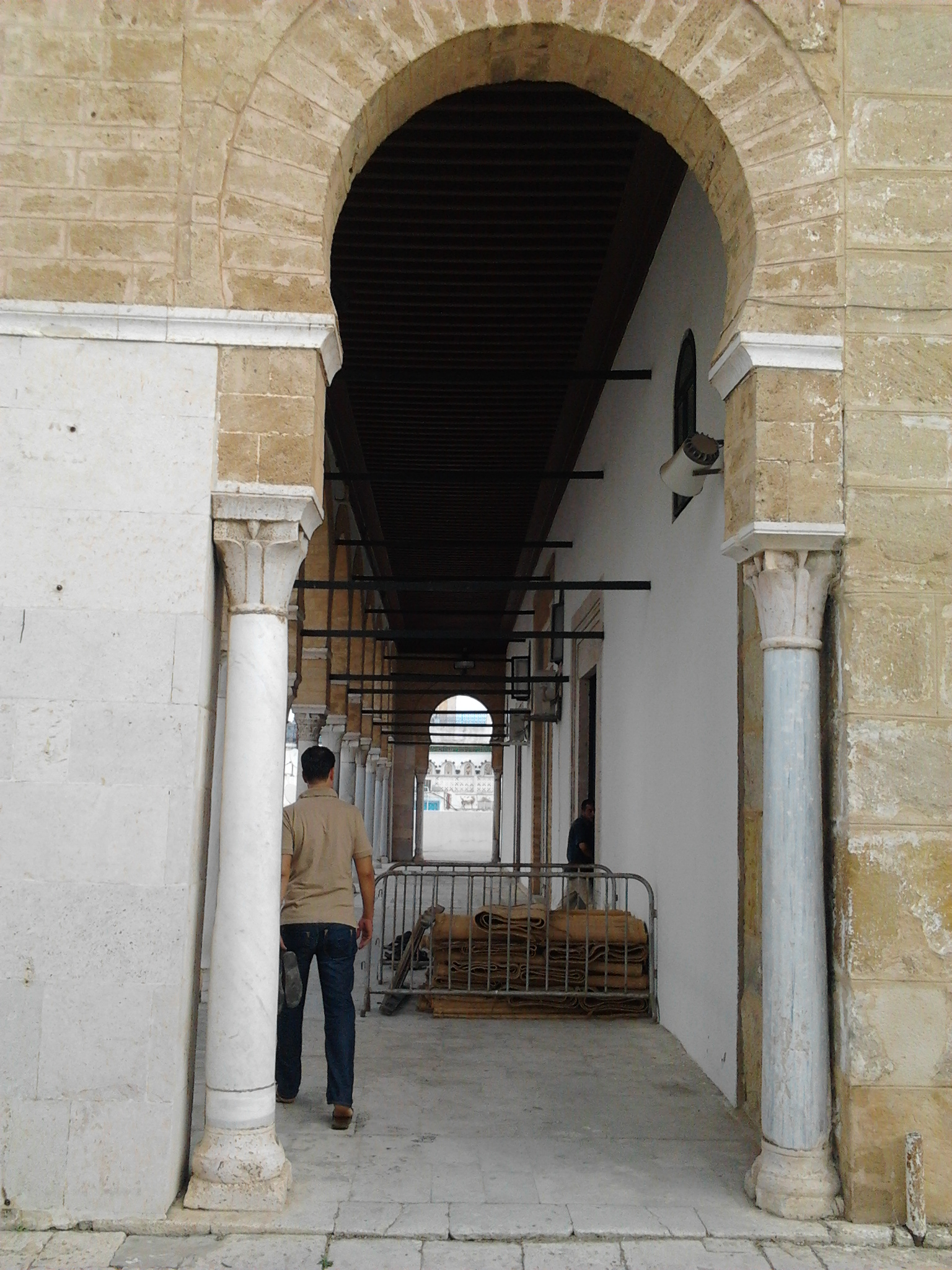
Mosque courtyard

== Hall of prayer ==
The prayer room is framed by courtyards on three sides to the east, north and west. Along the northern facade, a portico plays the role of gallery-narthex. Rectangular in plan, the room perpetuates the classical plan of the hypostyle hall; it consists of nine naves and seven bays. The arches rest on columns, of various origins, which carry capitals of Hafsid type, except some ancient examples. The covering of the prayer hall is in groin vault; a cupola on an octagonal base and horns in front of the mihrab. Near the latter is the masonry minbar covered with panels of polychrome marble; this is a novelty by contribution to mosques of Malikis whose minbar is executed in wood.

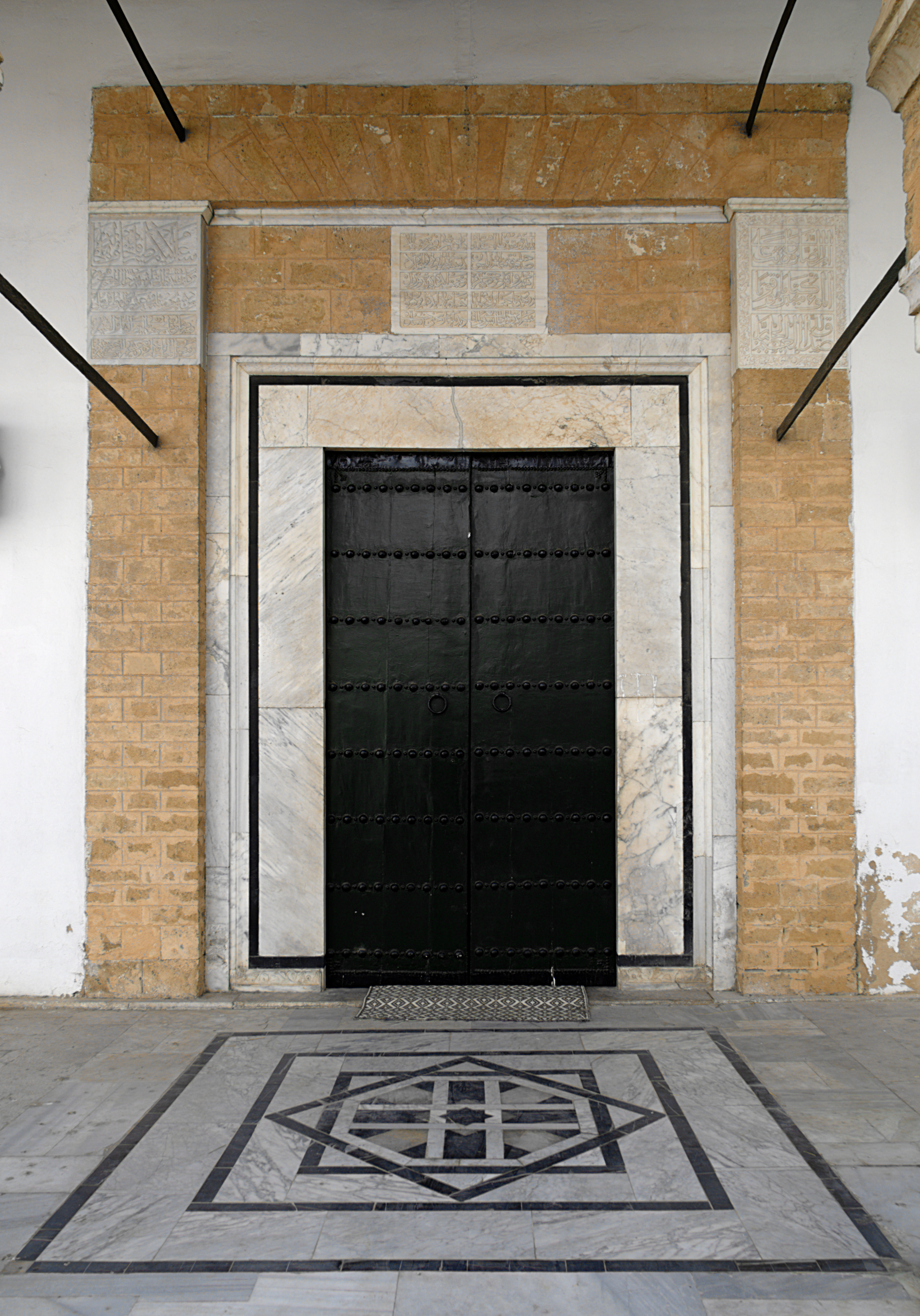
Detail of one of the doors of the mosque.

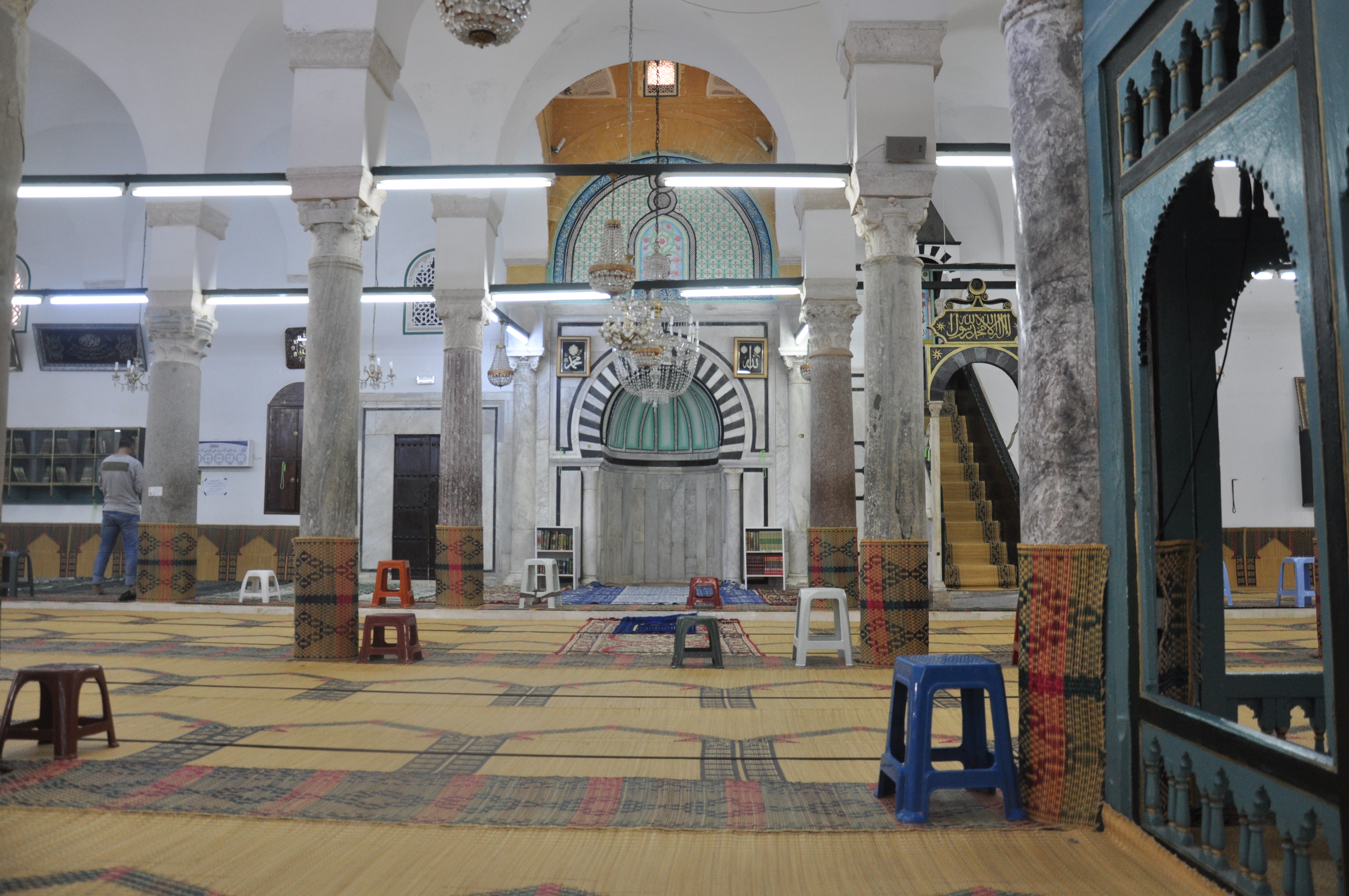
Interior view of the prayer hall. At the bottom is the mihrab.

== Minaret ==
Its minaret is the first octagonal minaret to be built in Tunis and was made by the Hafsids. The octagonal tower rises above a square base. It ends with a balcony protected by a wooden awning, the whole is crowned by a lantern with pyramidal roof covered with green tiles.

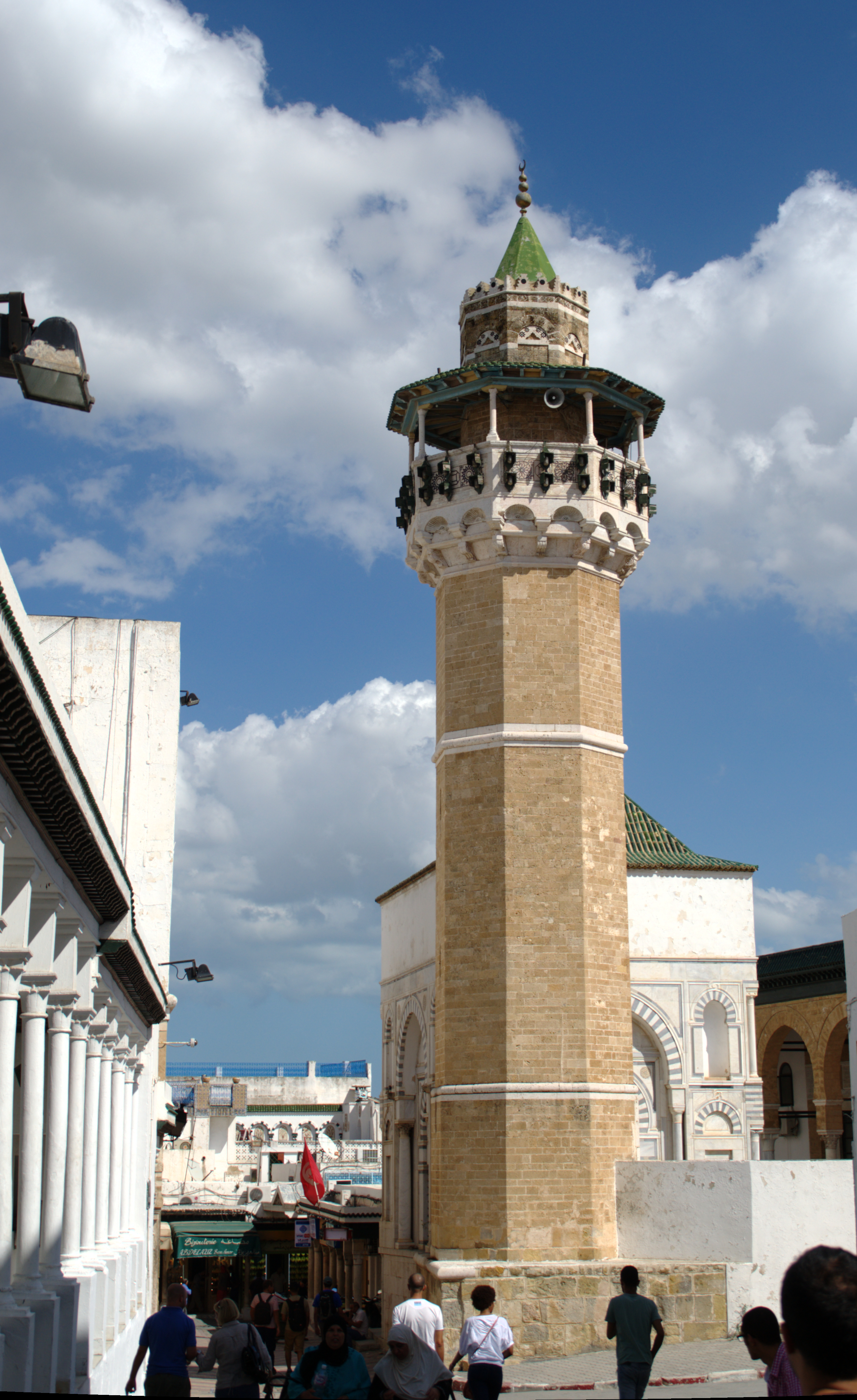
View of the minaret.

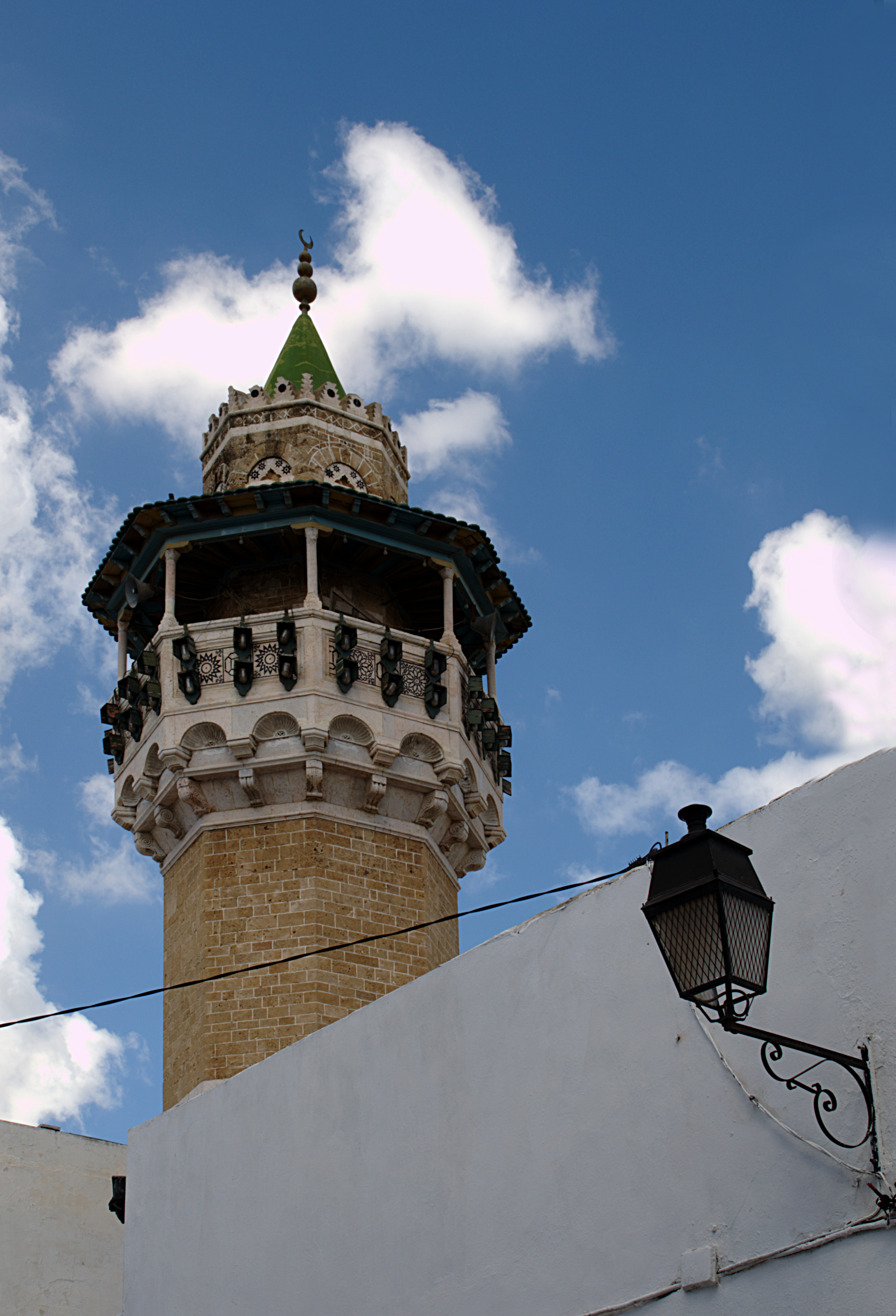
View of the upper part of the minaret.

== Mausoleum ==
The mosque also includes the mausoleum of Youssef Dey, inaugurating in Tunis the funeral mosque in which the tomb of the founder associates with the place of worship. Square plan, the mausoleum is covered with a pyramidal roof covered with green tiles. It has on each face a large central blind arcade, flanked by two levels of recesses in flat bottom. The facings of the white marble facades are accented with clavellus alternating black and white. A commemorative inscription on the central arch provides the date of construction of the mausoleum.

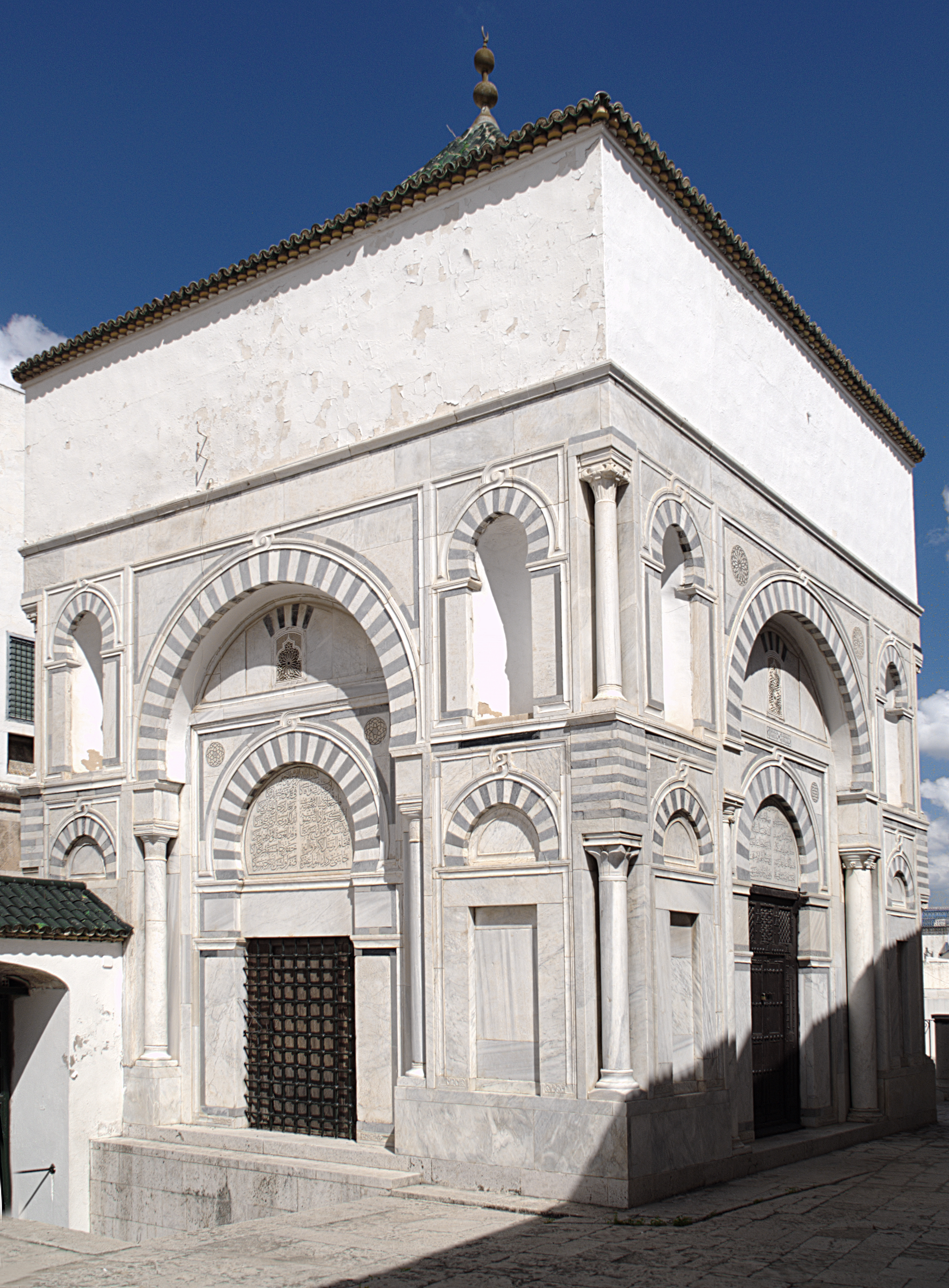
View of the mausoleum closing the burials of Youssef Dey and his family.

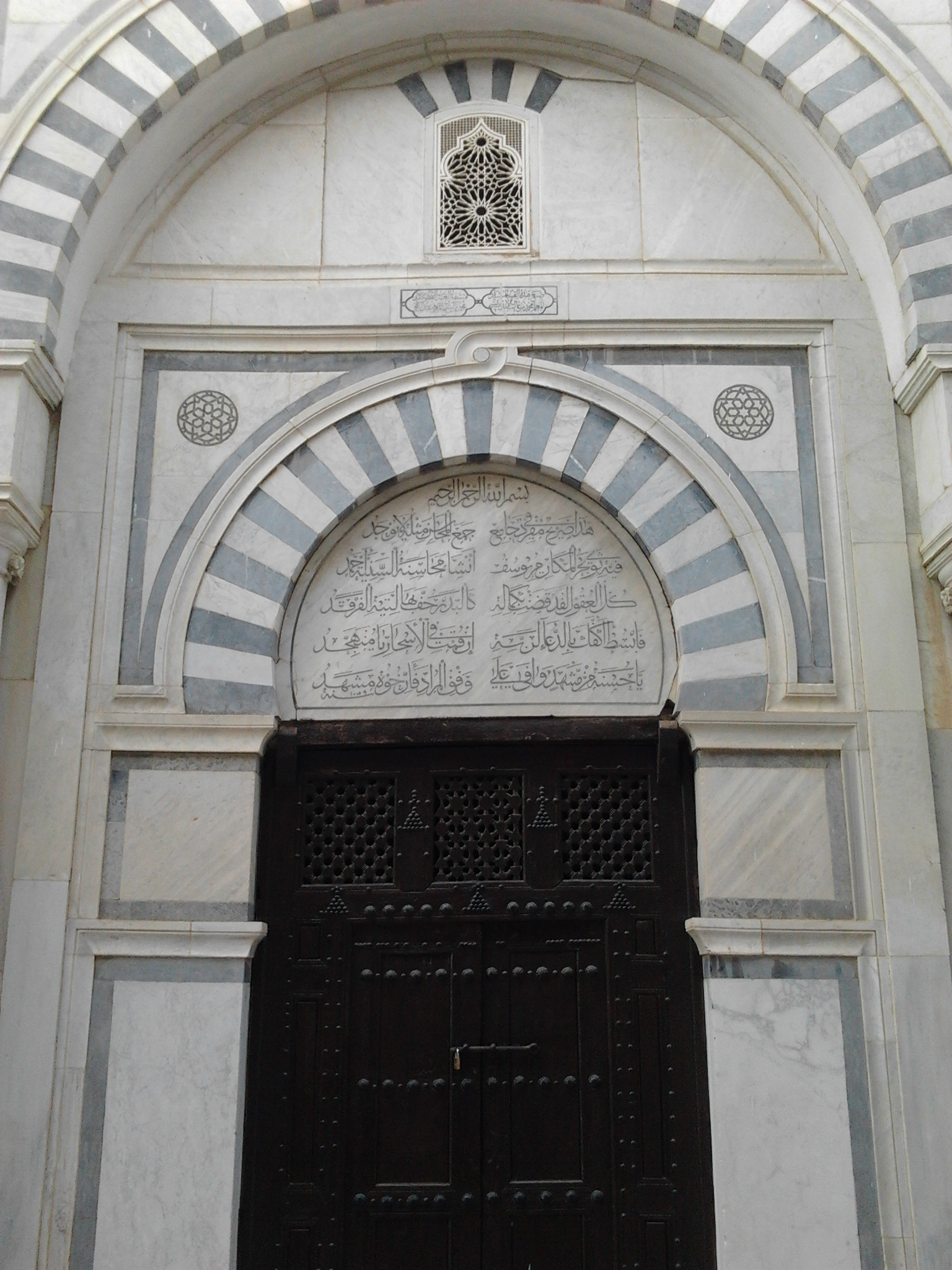
A mausoleum door, topped by a commemorative inscription.

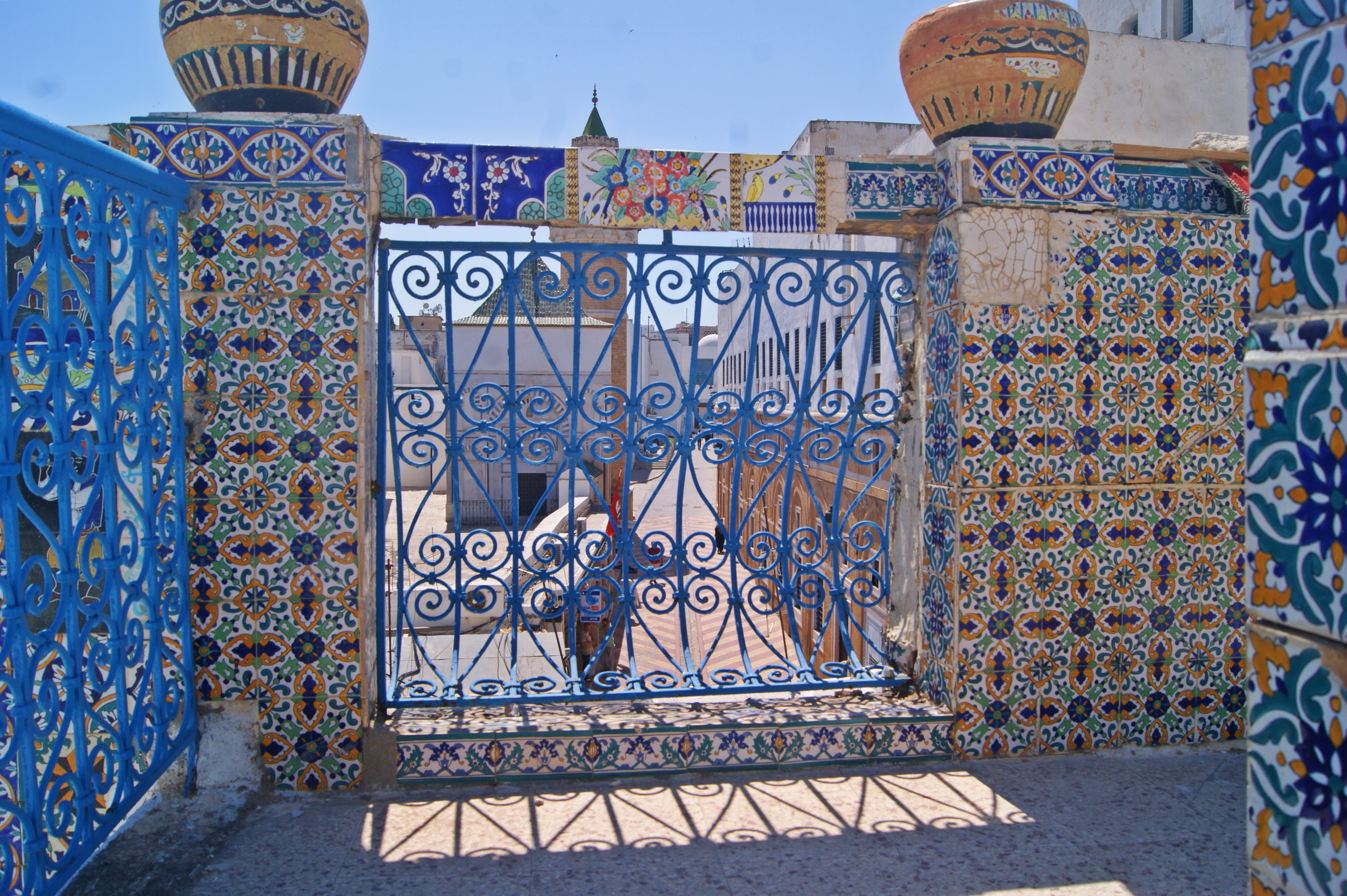
