= Souk El Berka =

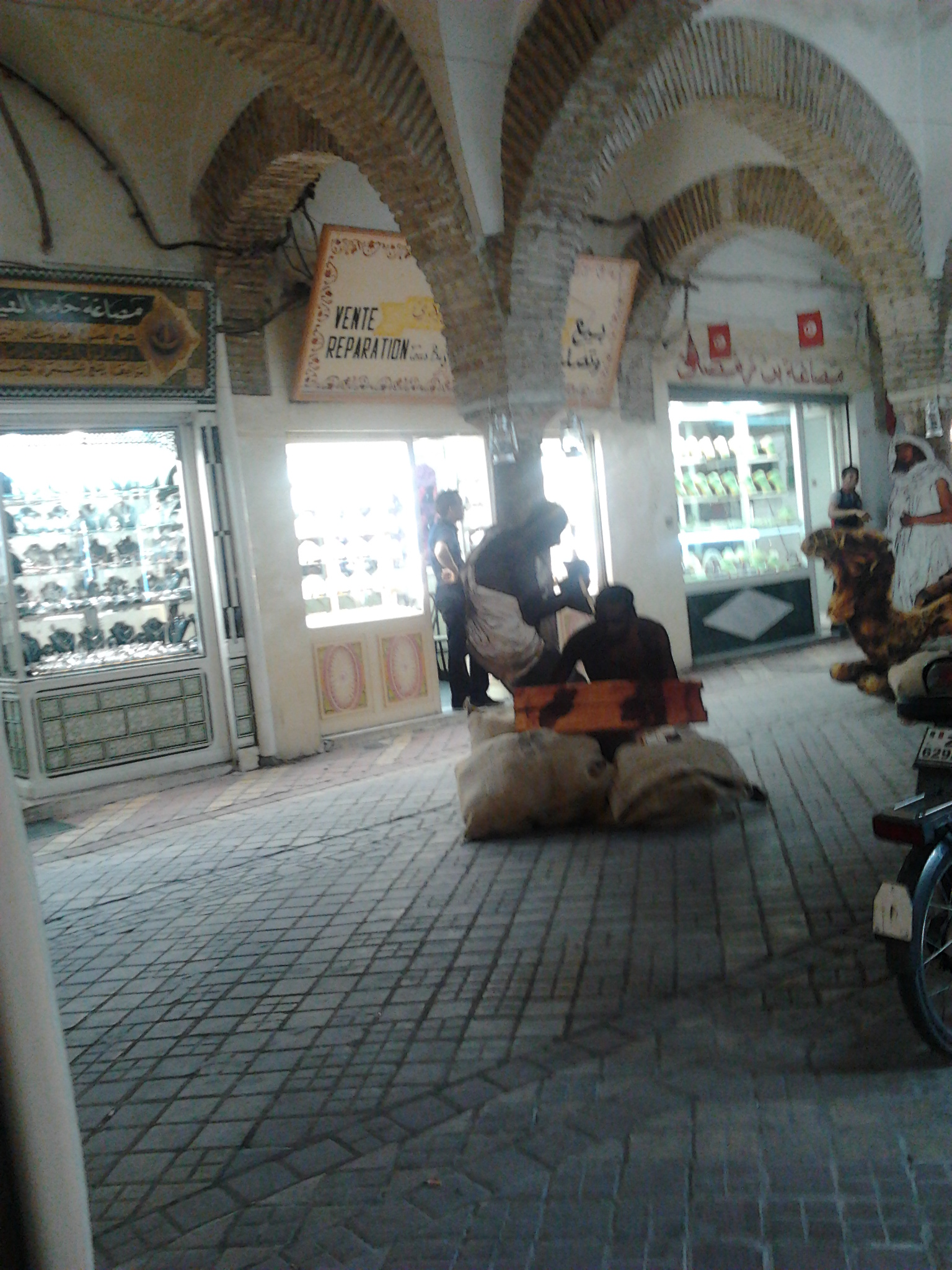
Souk El Berka.

Souk El Berka is one of the souks of the medina of Tunis. The market traders specialize in the jewellery trade.

== History ==
El Berka was built by Yusuf Dey in 1612 and was meant to sell slaves coming from West and Central Africa. Slaves of European origin, considered rarer and more precious, were not sold in the souk but in private locations because the sale concerned only wealthy potential buyers. This souk turned into a jewelers' souk after the abolition of slavery in Tunisia, decreed by Ahmad I ibn Mustafa in 1846.

== Location ==
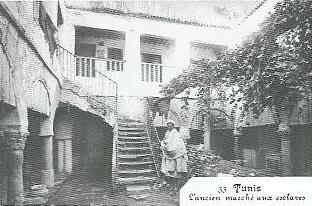
Old slaves souk in the medina of Tunis.

The souk is located near the kasbah, the seat of the head of government, Dar El Bey and other souks, for example Souk El Bey, Souk Ech-Chaouachine, and Souk El Leffa. It is perpendicular to Souk El Trouk (Turks).

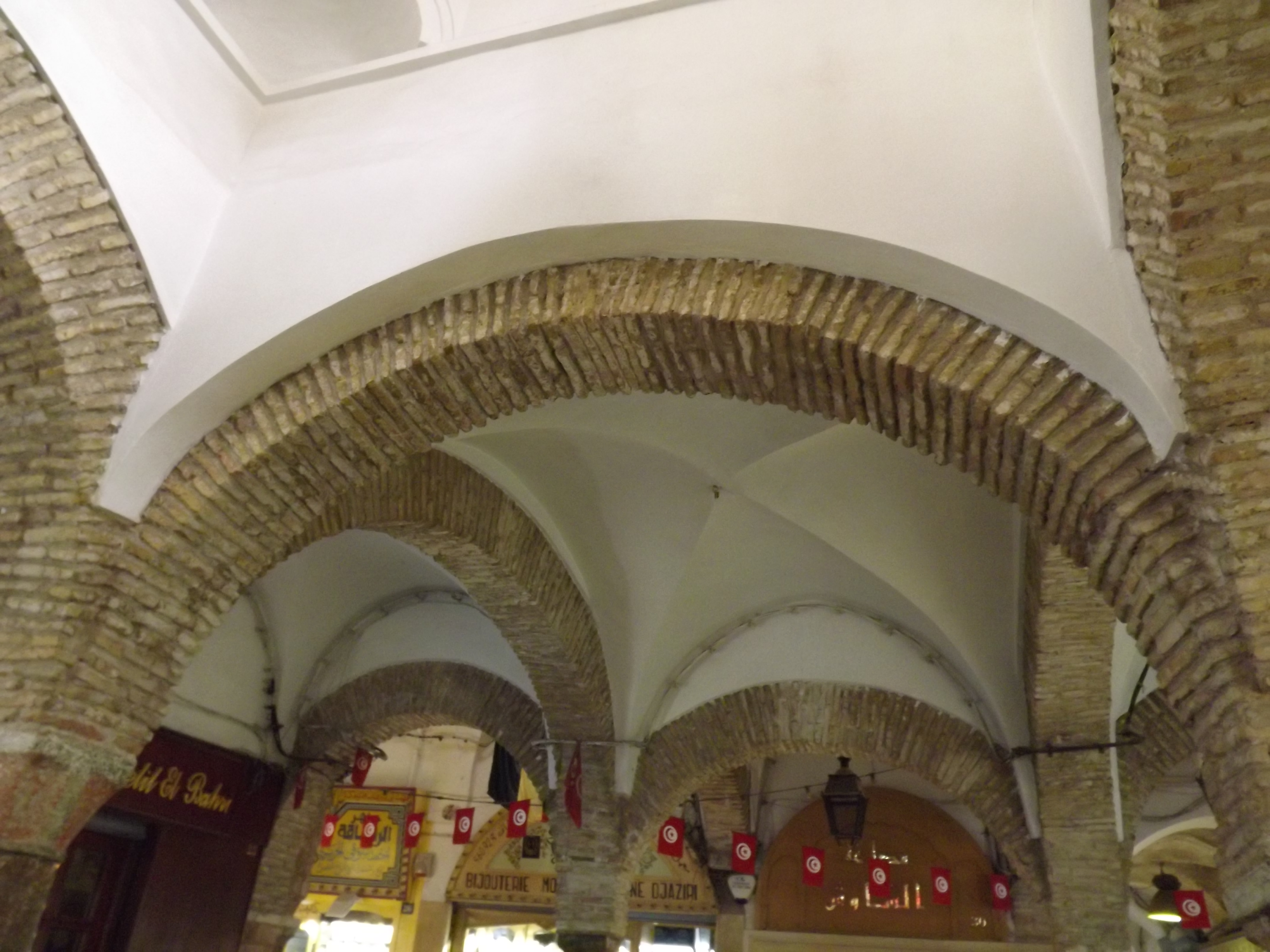
Arches of Souk El berka

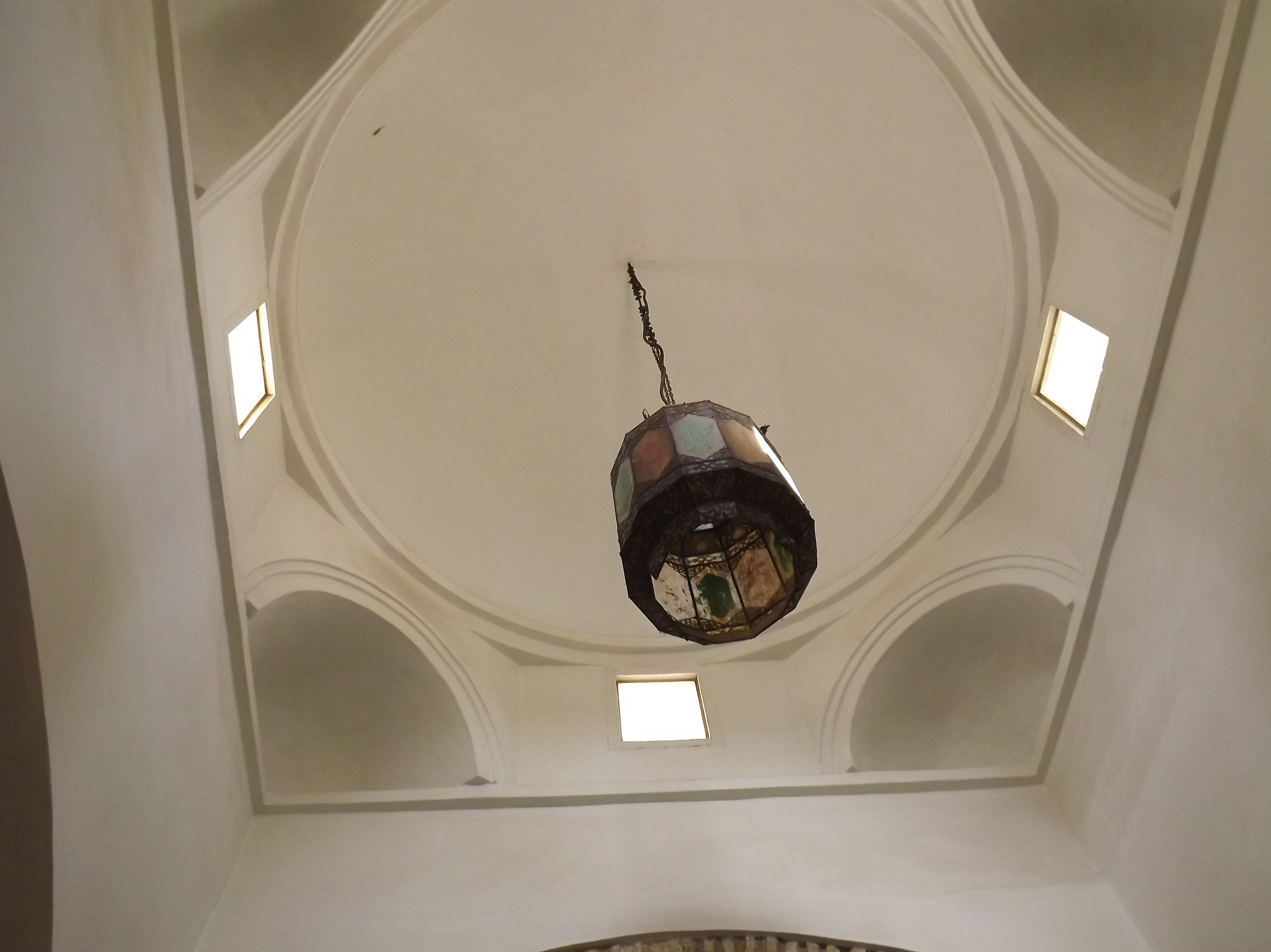
A dome in Souk El berka

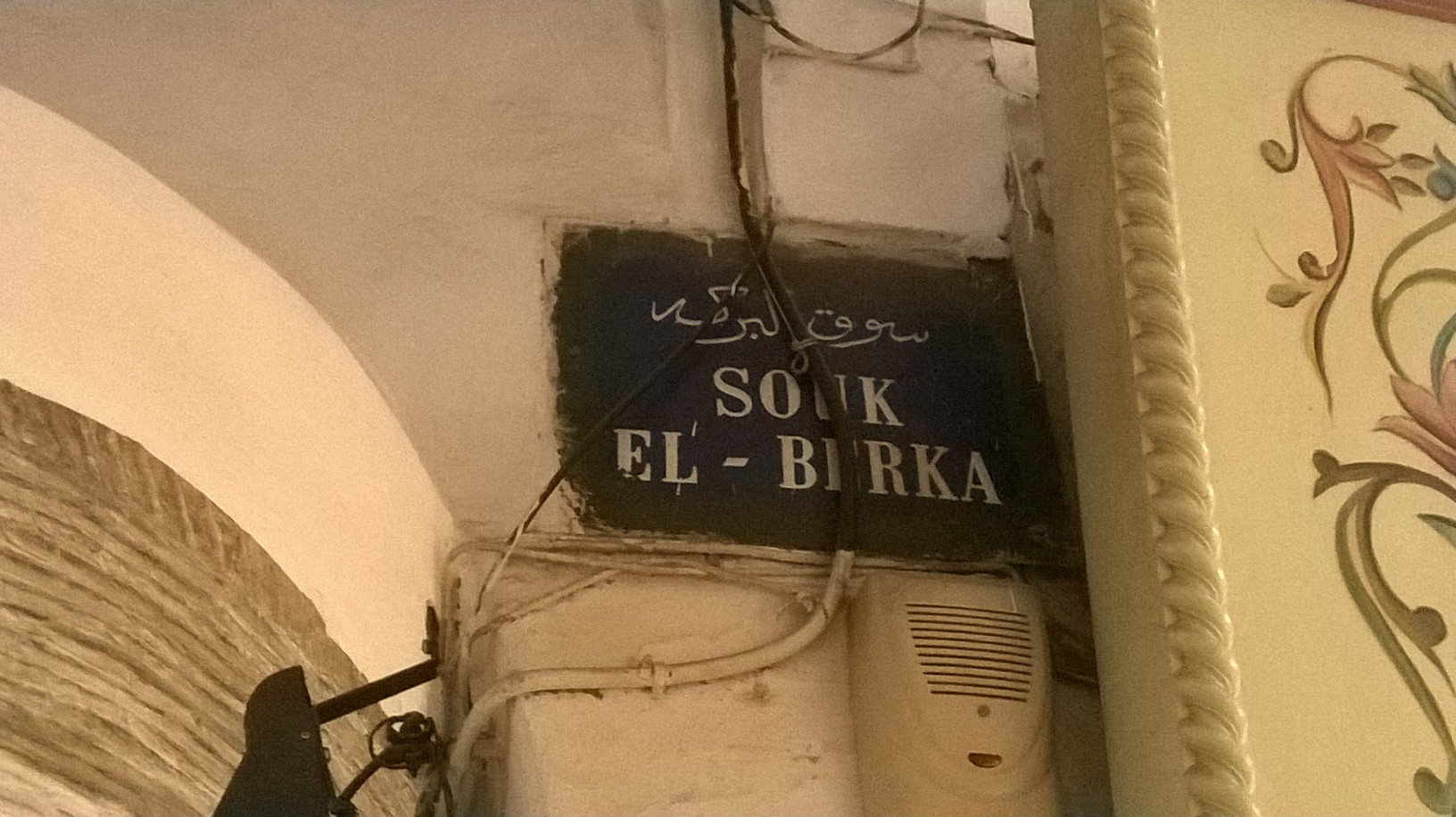
Metallic plaque of Souk El Berka

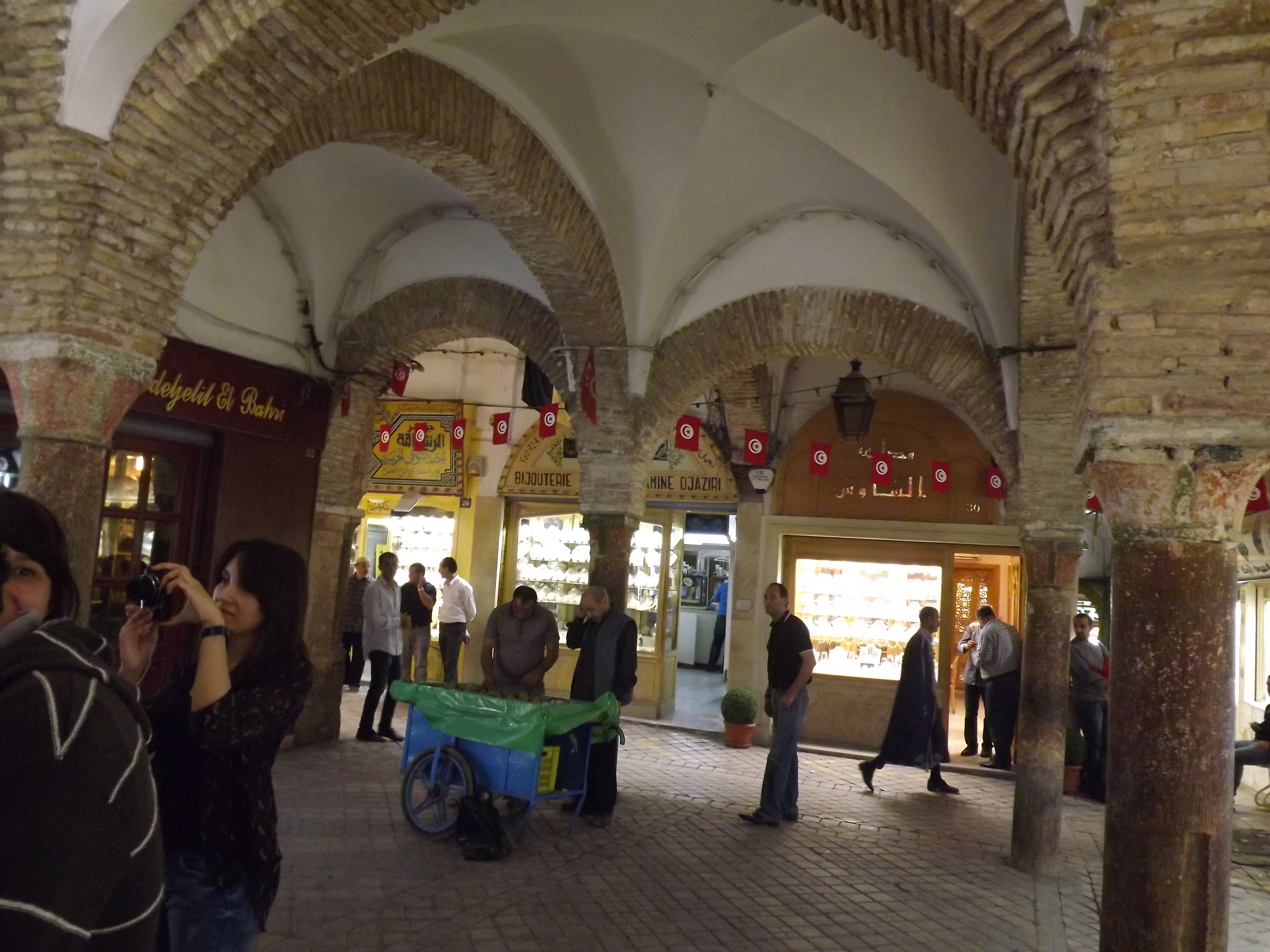
The shops

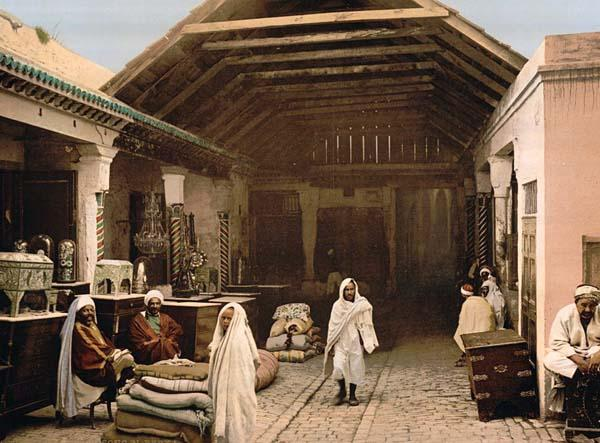
Souk El Berka in 1899

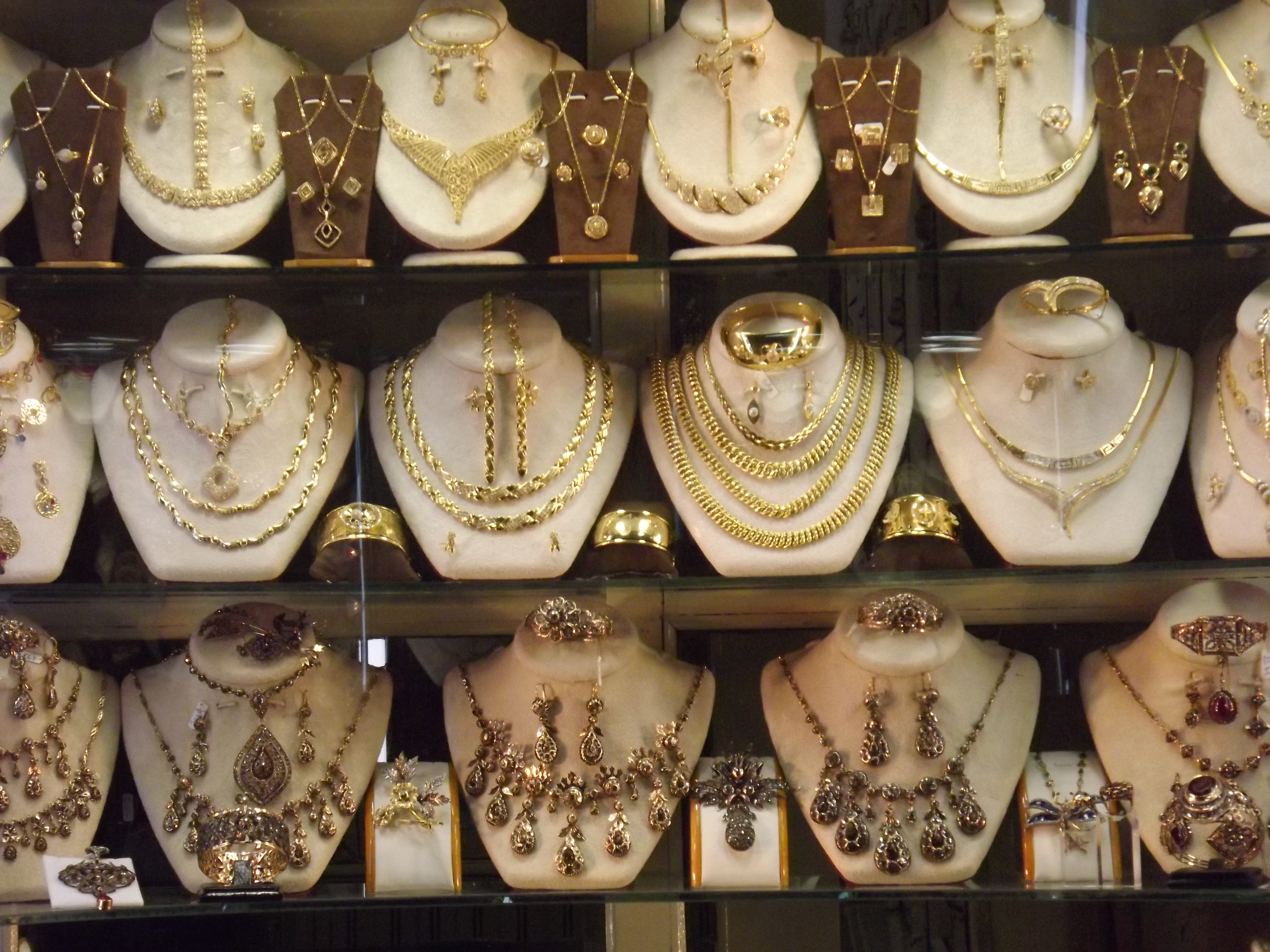
A Gold shop in Souk El Berka

== Architecture ==
Located at the crossroads of four streets, Souk El Berka takes a square shape and has three aisles separated by two rows of columns. Formerly a wooden platform at the centre was the place where slaves were presented (that was the origin of the name berka) and waited for the outcome of the sale. The place was covered by a central dome and several side vaults.
