= Bou Chouaicha Mosque =

Mosque in Sfax, Tunisia

Coordinates: 34.737109°N 10.75971°E

- جامع بوشويشة
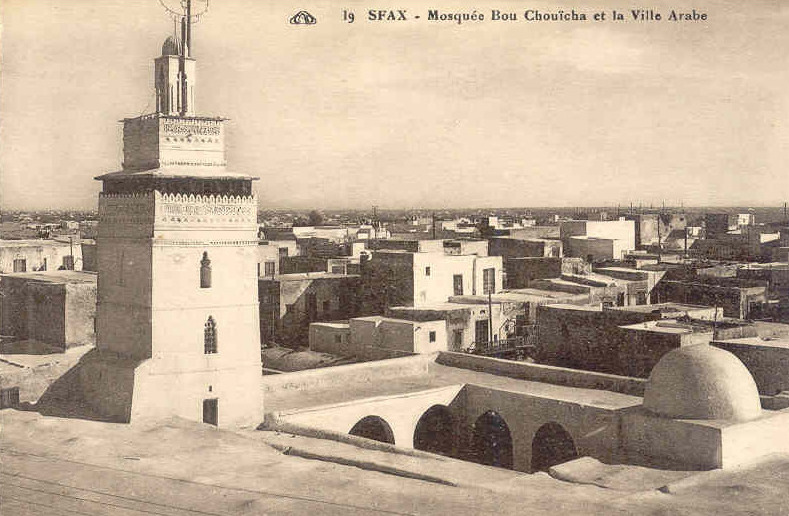

Religion
- Affiliation: Islam

Location
- Municipality: Medina of Sfax
- Country: Tunisia
- Interactive map of Bou Chouaicha Mosque

Architecture
- Type: mosque

Bou Chouaicha Mosque (Arabic: جامع بوشويشة) is one of the oldest and most important mosques of the medina of Sfax, Tunisia.

== Etymology ==
According to the historian Mahmoud Megdiche, the mosque got its name from the job of the Chaouech (Guard of the door in Arabic), as it was very close to one of the main entrances of the medina: Bab Jebli.

== Localisation ==
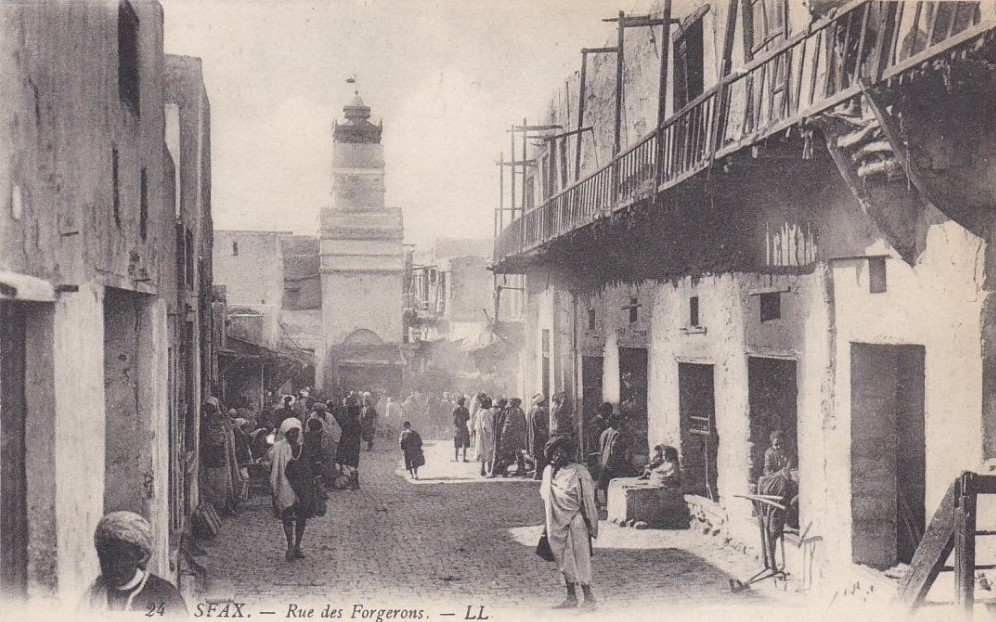
Souk El Haddadine surrounding the mosque

The monument is located in the northern part of the medina. It is surrounded by souks such as Souk El Haddadine from the north, Souk El Ghzal from the south and Souk El Sabbaghine from the east. Thanks to this localisation, the mosque played a major economic role, but also a defensive one.

== History ==
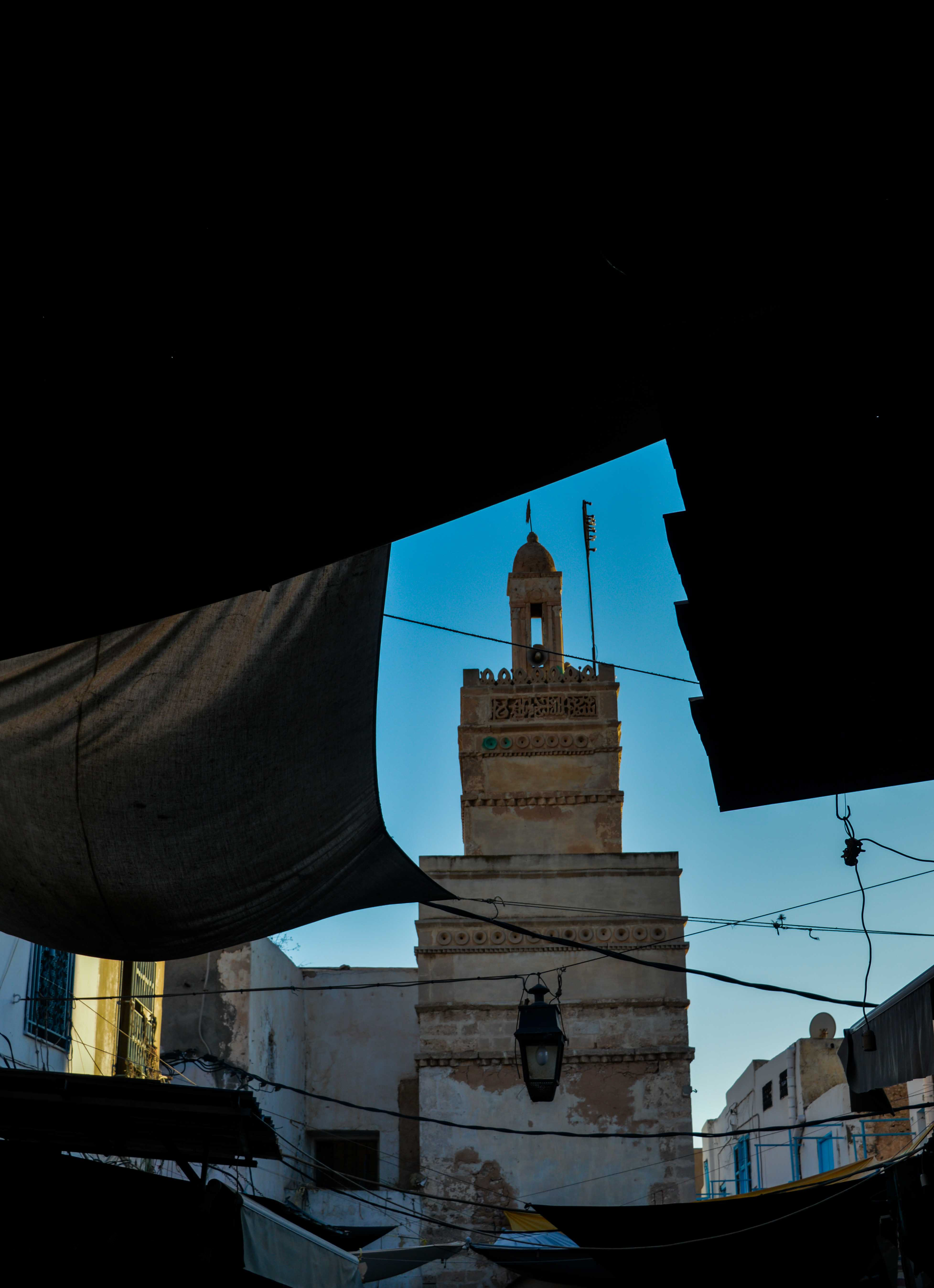
Minaret of the mosque

According to the inscription at the entrance of the mosque, it was built by the mason Mohammed Al Kotti, descendant of the famous El Kotti family, known for its major contribution to the local architecture through the construction of many public buildings of the medina in the 10th century, such as the Great Mosque and Hammam El Soltane.

The first historical trace of the mosque Bou Chouaïcha goes back to 1857 in the inventory of the religious monuments of Sfax set by the students of the Military School of Bardo. The monument is later mentioned in the writings of Abu Abbas Nouri, in his account journals, and finally in the report of the French authorities about the bombed monuments in 1881.

== Description ==
The mosque was built in two phases: the first one was during the Zirid period, with a prayer room similar to the one in other mosques such as the mosque of the Kasbah and the Sidi Saada mausoleum; a second prayer room with a different style was added later, increasing the capacity of the building, as well as a minaret at the northeast corner.

Nowadays, the mosque has a shape of a rectangle of 24 meters long and 7.5 meters wide. Its authentic facade inspired the design of the facade of the Sidi Belhassen Karray mausoleum in 1721.
