= Souk El Jazzarine =

Souk El Jazzarine (Arabic: سوق الجزارين) is one of the souks (or market) of the medina of Sfax and specifically of Bab Jebli.

== Localization ==
The original souk El Jazzarine used to have a place to slaughter the animals. It was surrounded by Souk El Sabbaghine from the west, Souk El Haddadine from the north and Fondouk El Haddadine from the east side.

Considering the city's evolution, the souk was transferred to become located in front of Bab Jebli which made it limited by the path neighboring to the southern city's wall, Souk El Mahsoulat from the east side and Souk El Omrane from the west side.

== History ==
According to some historical documents of the Siala family's private properties, kept in Dar Jallouli's museum, the souk was called Rahbet El Thabh (or slaughter space).

In the 19th century, the president of Awqaf association, Mr Omar Barakat, asked his local representative in Sfax, Mr Mohamed Fendri, to change the legal status of the souk into a municipal property during a meeting on 10 December 1887.

In 1960, the municipality merged Souk El Mahsoulat and Souk El Jazzarine, while the old slaughter place became a fish market and then a vegetables market.
