= Souk El Zrayiia =

Souk El Zrayiia (Arabic: سوق الزرايعية), also called the Agricultor's Market, is one of the souk, or markets, of the medina of Sfax, Tunisia.

The souk is located between Rahbet al niima and Souk El Trouk. It extends from the west of path of the Trouk and connects with Souk El Kamour then takes a left turn along with the Siyaghin's path till the last corner where Souk El Fakkahine which is the Dried Fruit's Market.
