= Souk Erbaa El Saghir =

Souk Erbaa El Saghir (Arabic:سوق الربع الصغير) or the small Souk Erbaa is one of the souks of the medina of Sfax.

== Localization ==
Souk Erbaa El Saghir represents and extension for Souk El Hannatine. According to Boubaker Abdelkafi, originally this souk was basically a group of stables that by the time, got converted into workshops for making chain for weavers.
