= Souk El Sayaghine =

Souk El Sayaghine (Arabic:سوق الصياغين) or the Jewelry makers souk is one of the souks of the medina of Sfax. This souk used to be located in the western part of Souk Erbaa. As we can understand from its name, it was specialized in selling jewelry and all products made of precious metal.
