= Souk El Mahsoulat =

Souk El Mahsoulat (Arabic : سوق المحصولات) or market of the harvests is one of the oldest souks of Bab Jebli, in the Medina of Sfax.

== Activity ==
This souk is specialized in selling local products of Sfax (cereals, almonds, olives, etc.). Its activity depends on the harbor and agricultural activity in the city.

== Localization ==
Souk El Mahsoulat is located in the east of Bab Jebli, one of the northern gates of the medina. It is surrounded by Souk Kriaa from the northern side near the old slaughterhouse, and by Souk El Omrane from the eastern one.

== History and etymology ==
This market was founded in 1840 following the orders of the grand vizier Mustapha Saheb Ettabaa. But it kept changing its appellation. Apart from its current name (Souk El Mahsoulat), it is also called Souk Essaay (or livestock market) and Souk El Foundouk.

In 1960, the municipality rehabilitated the souk and changed it into a daily fruits and vegetables market.
