= Souk El Fakkahine =

Souk El Fakkahine (Arabic: سوق الفكاهين) is one of the oldest souks of the Medina of Sfax. This souk (or market) does not exist anymore.

== Localization ==
Souk El Fakkahine was located between Souk Errbaa El Saghir and Ellakhmi Street that represents that northern part of El Sayyaghine Street. It was parallel to Souk Es Sabbaghine.

== History ==
The souk was mentioned in many old contracts of private properties of El Hsairi family. The oldest one goes to the 17th century.

== Specialty and current status ==
According to some historians, the souk got its name from the word Fakiha (Arabic: فاكهة) or fruits, as they were the main product of this market. Therefore, there were some Jewish jewelry shops and some tin professionals.

Nowadays, Souk El Jazzarine occupies all the place and it is specialized in selling meat products.
