= Souk El Srayria =

Tunisian bazaar

Souk El Srayria (arabic : سوق السرايرية) is one of the oldest souks of the medina of Sfax.

== Localization ==
The souk occupied a big part of Souk El Haddadine.

== Activity ==
The souk was specialized in the manufacturing of the rifle butt called Srir in Tunisian dialect. And this is how the souk got its current appellation.
