= Souk Kriaa =

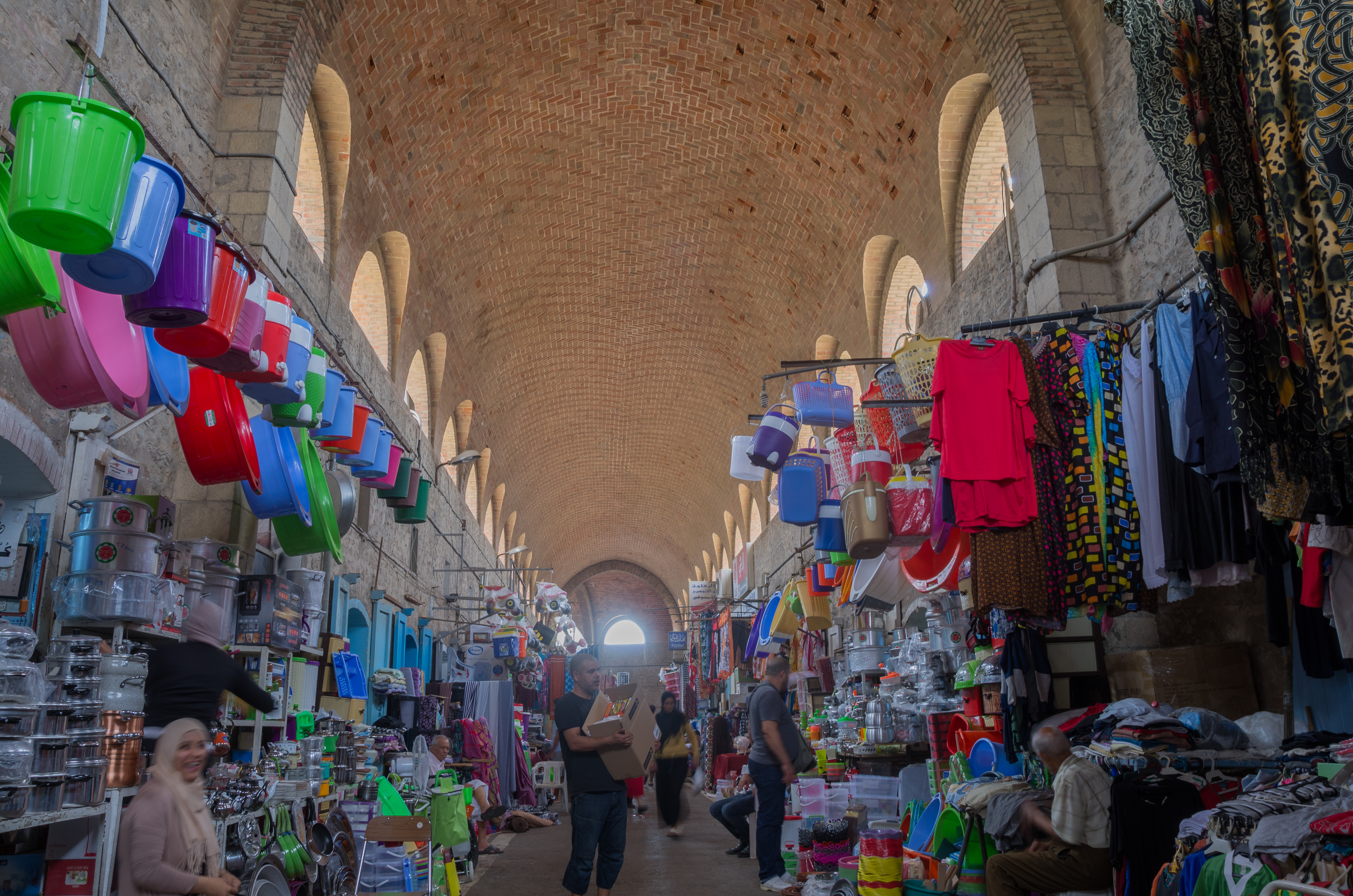
Souk Kriaa

Souk Kriaa (Arabic : سوق قريعة) or The New Souk that is also known as Souk El Msakkaf is one of the markets of the Medina of Sfax.

== Localization ==
It is located outside of the northern Medina's fences right in front of the Bab Jebli. It is principally home to fabric shops, household machines, and butchers.

== History ==
The souk was designed by the French architect Bernard Zehrfuss, it was opened in 1952. In 2000, it was classified as a national historical monument by the National Institute of Heritage.

The souk carries the last name of the contractor and the main builder Mohamed Kriaa.

== Architecture ==
Souk Kriaa is a covered space with an irregular pentagon shape, with four domed wings and a huge entrance that contains a huge dome. It surrounds Souk El Hout from all four sides.

After World War II, due to the immense lack of building materials (like iron and cement), Mohammed Kriaa preferred using local materials to build the souk. That's how it was built using the traditional way with local stones and lime. As for the roof, the domes and barrels were made using clay bricks, depending on the huge arcs that are a little bit cracked.

All these details emphasize the view and the aesthetic integration of the souk in its environment, to the point that it is still considered as an extension to the Medina of Sfax. This building is well integrated into its environment and it is a component that can not be ignored in the urban scene of the center of Sfax.

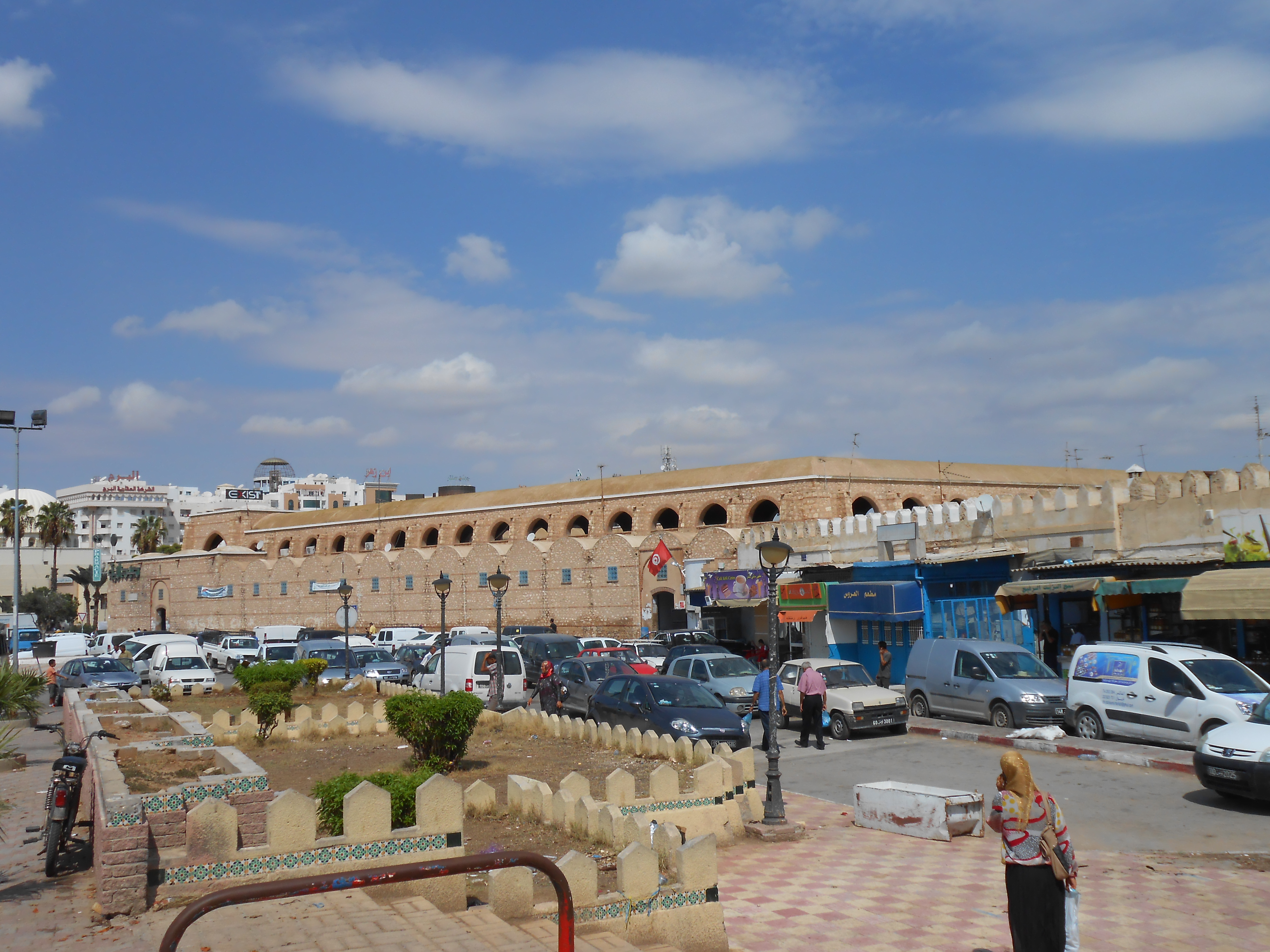
Facade of Souk Kriaa

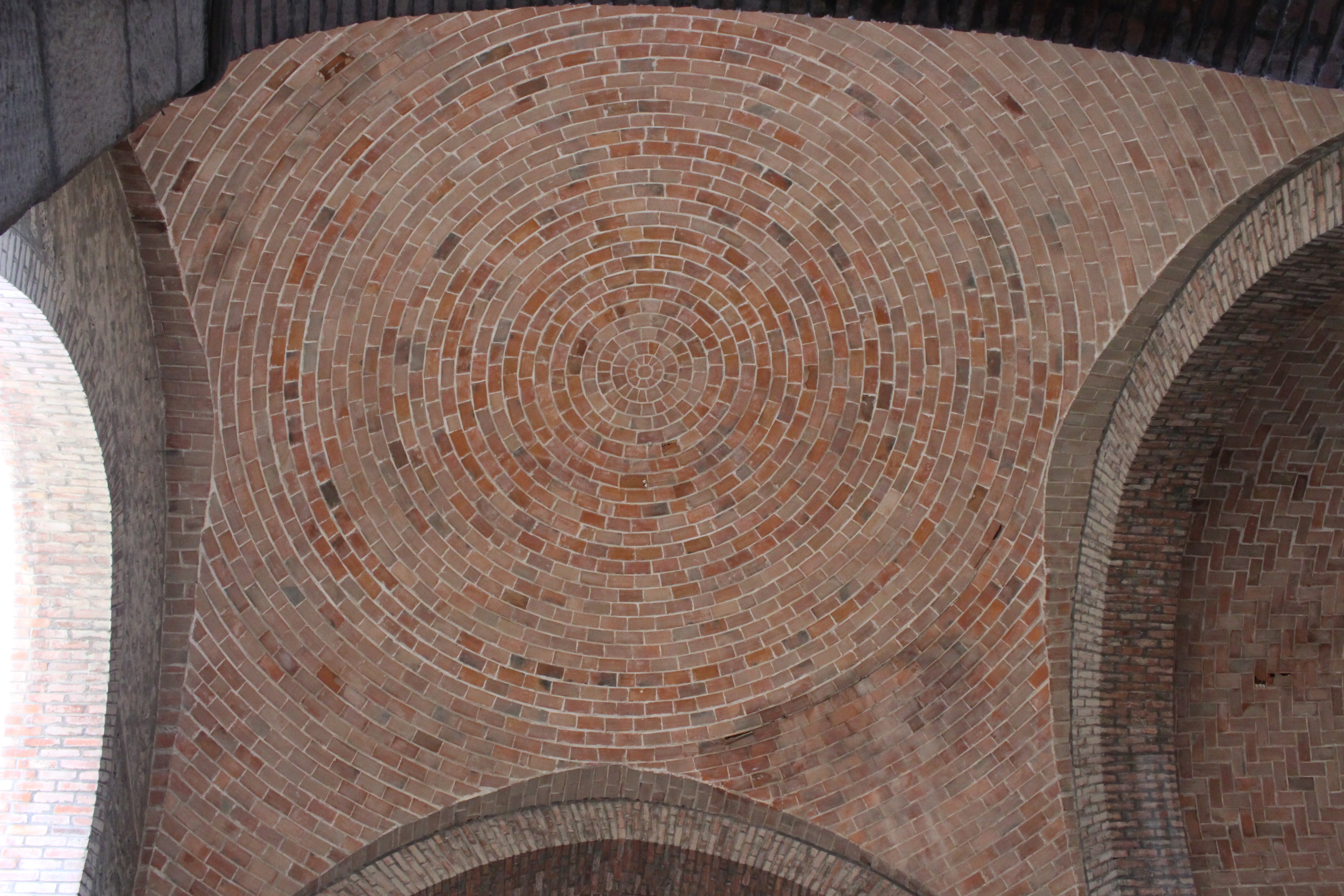
Main dome of the souk

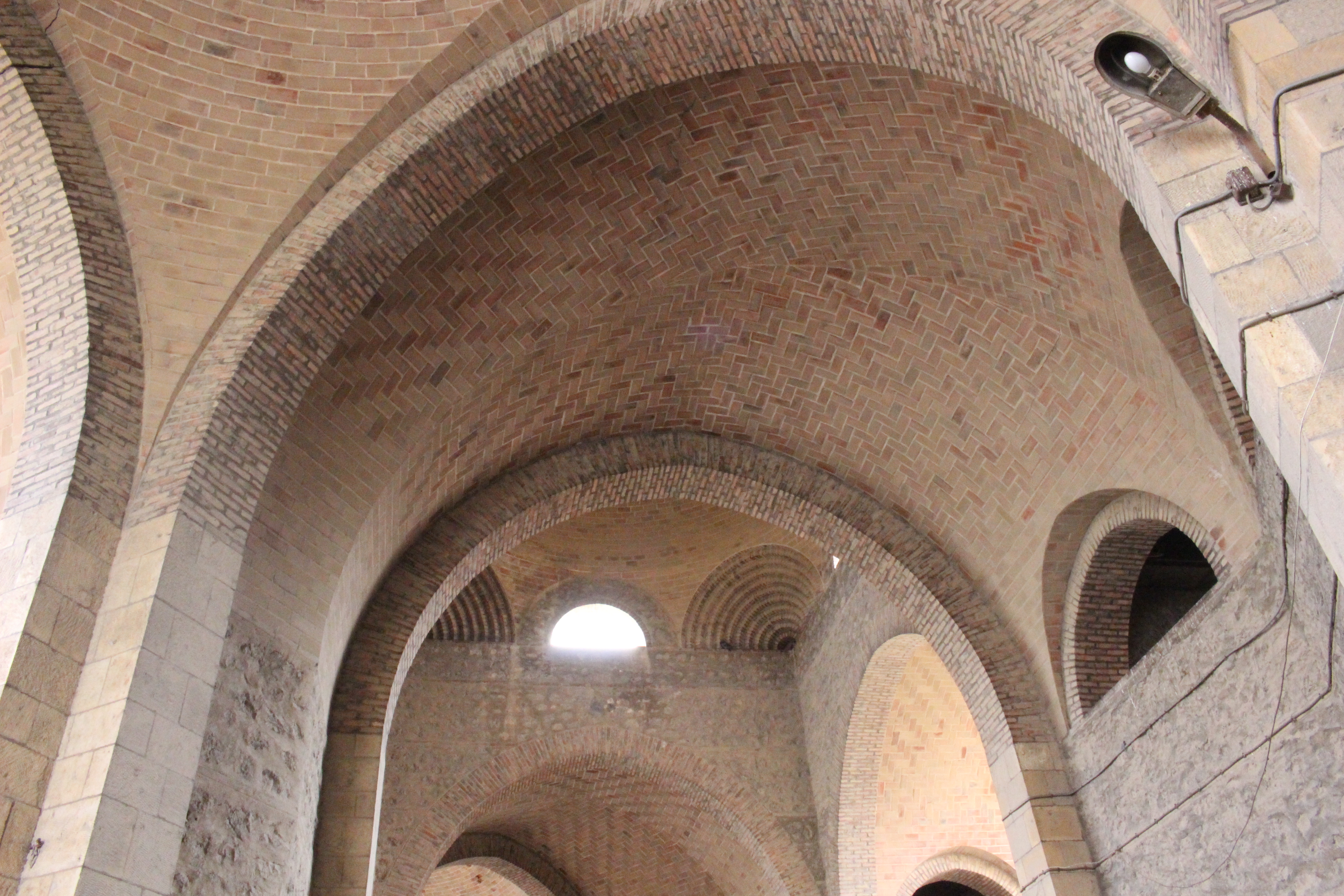
Arches of the souk

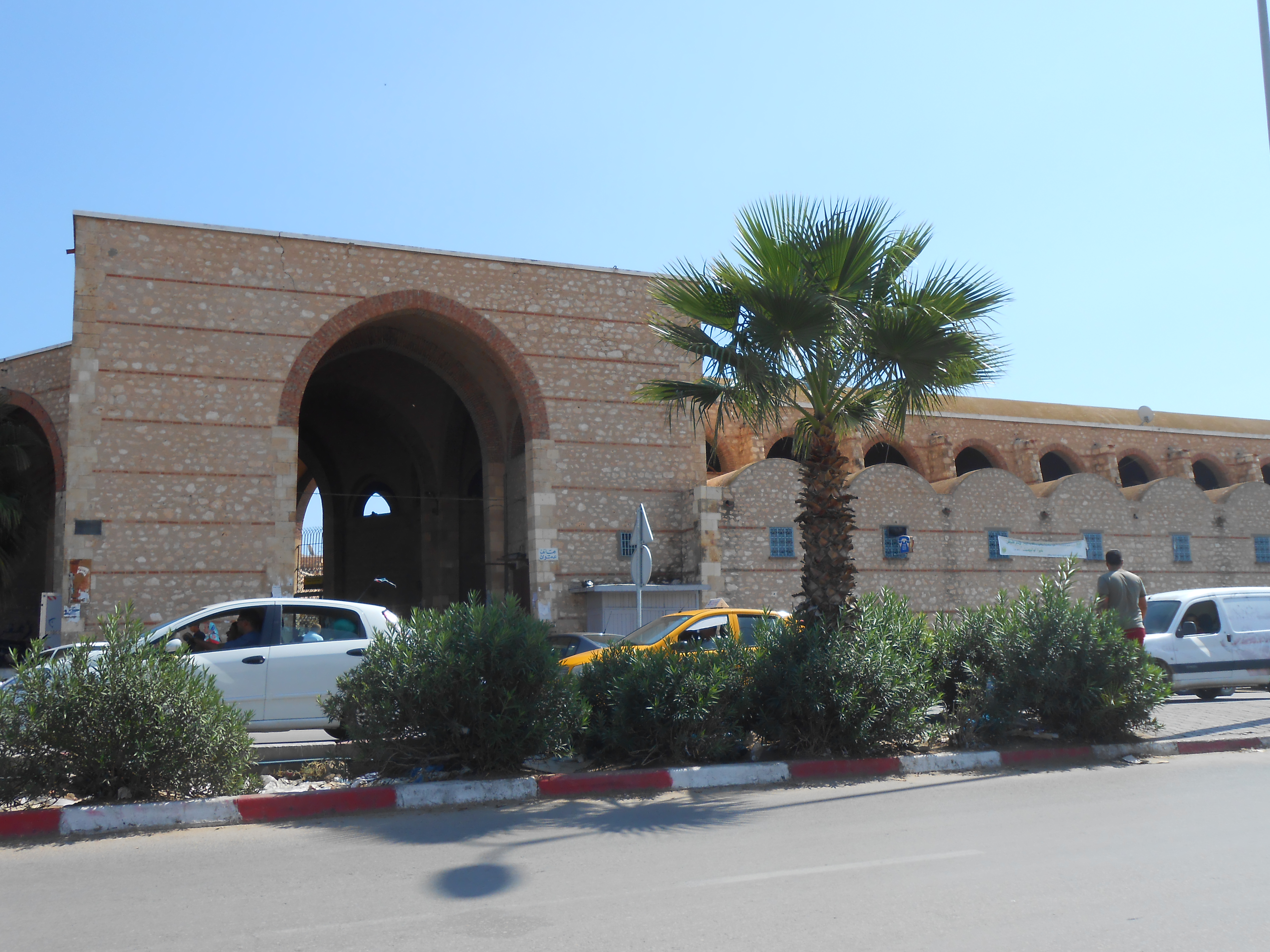
Main entrance of Souk Kriaa
