= Souk Es Sabbaghine (Sfax) =

Souq in Sfax, Tunisia

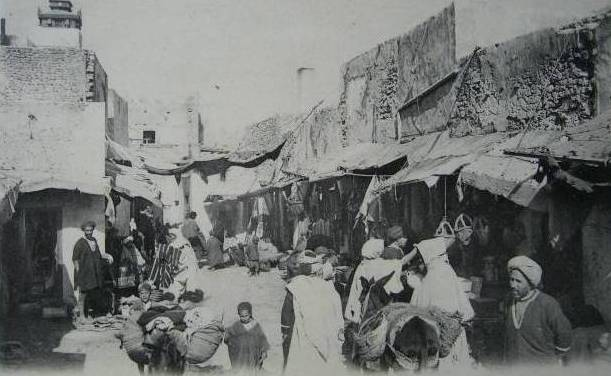
Souk Es Sabbaghine

Souk Es Sabbaghine (Arabic: سوق الصباغين) or the dry cleaners market is one of the oldest souks of the medina of Sfax.

== Etymology ==
The souk got its designation from the dry cleaners who used to work there. Currently, it is called « Souk Sidi Bou Chouaïcha » with reference to a small mosque in it.

== Localization ==
This market is located in the north–south axis in the extension of Souk Errbaa near Souk El Haddadine and Bab Jebli. It is surrounded by Souk El Gazal to the north-west, and Souk El Bleghjiya to the south-east.

== Description ==
According to historians, Souk Es Sabbaghine had many workshops for dry cleaners and tanners.

However presently, the tanning and dyeing workshops have been moved to the outside of the medina, with fruits and vegetable traders instead occupying the center of the medina.
