= Souk El Gazal =

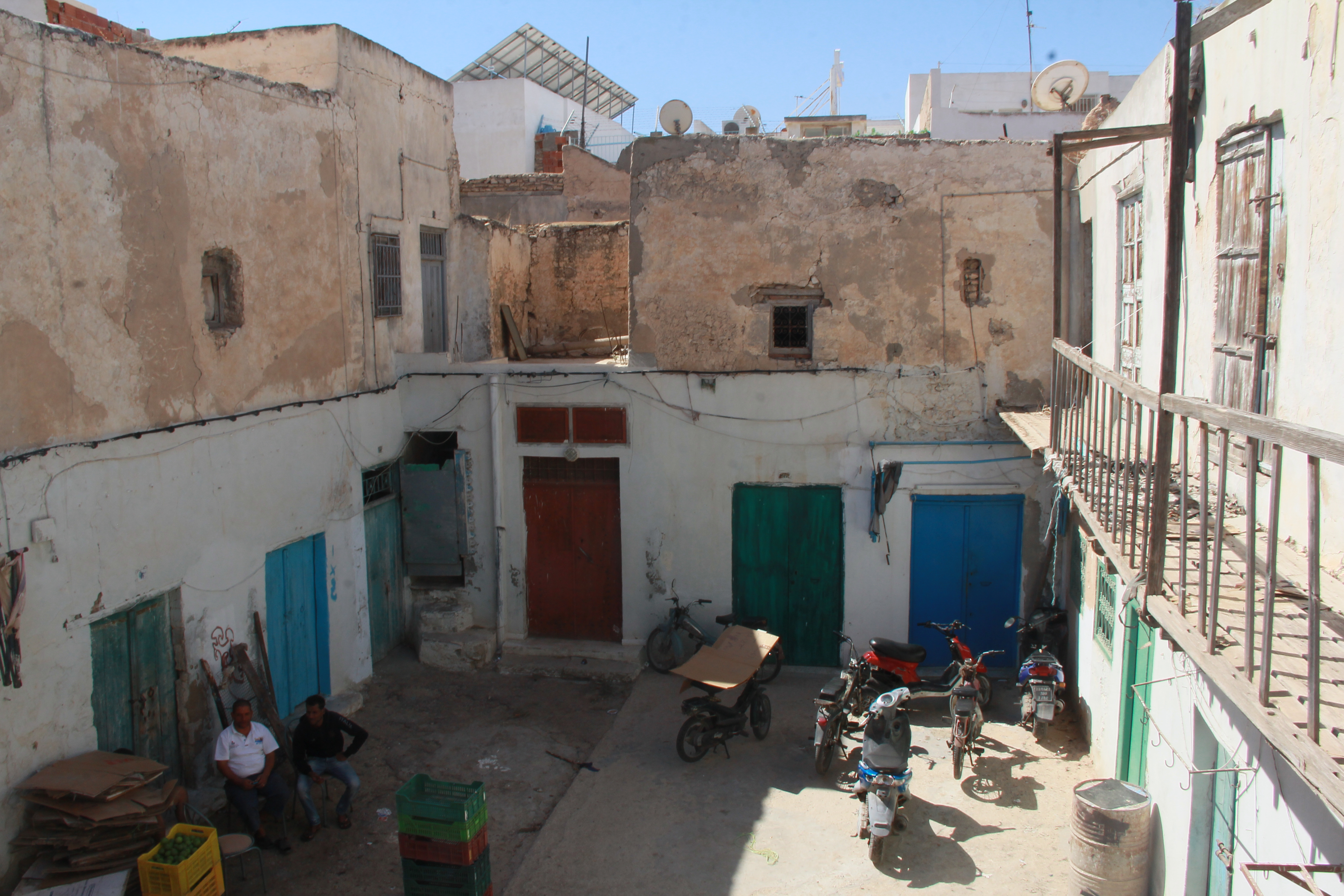
Souk El Gazal

Souk El Gazal (Arabic: سوق الغزل)) (or the, also known as Souk El Toomaa (Arabic: سوق الطعمة) is one of the souks of the northern part of Medina of Sfax, near the Bou Chouaicha mosque.

== Activity ==
As the Arabic appellation indicates, this market is specialized in the wool, silk and cotton industry. It's linked to Souk Es Sabbagine as most of the products of Souk El Gazal go straight to this souk in order to get tanned.

== Architecture ==
Souk El Gazal has one unique entrance. All its shops are located in the ground floor while the first floor is dedicated for the workshops. It
