= Souk El Hannatine =

Souk El Hannatine (Arabic: سوق الحناطين) or souk El Attarine is one of the old markets of the Medina of Sfax.

== Etymology ==
The name of the souk is inspired by the embalmers that occupy it who used to sell coffins and any materials needed for washing the dead.

== Localization ==
Souk El Hannatine used to be located in the east part of the main approach perpendicular to Souk El Rbaa.

== History ==
According to some historical documents, this souk was called Souk Al Marsten named after the hospital that used to be there while the French authorities were in Souk Al Chachiat.

During the 19th century, its name was changed to Souk Al Attarine, which is still used.
