= Sidi Saada Mausoleum =

Zawiya in Sfax, Tunisia

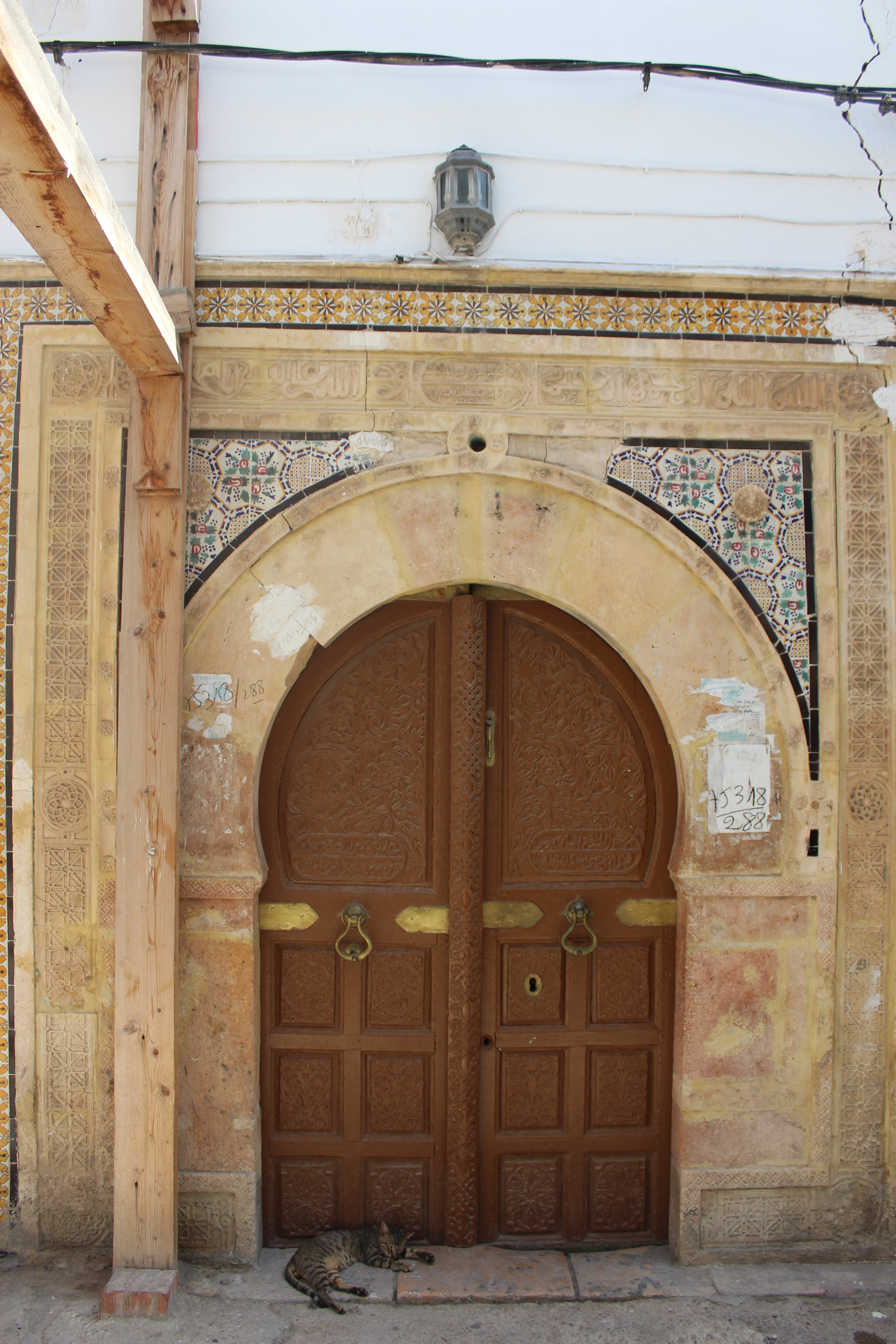
Sidi Saada mausoleum entrance

Sidi Saada Mausoleum, also known as zaouiet Sidi Saada (Arabic: زاوية سيدي سعادة), is one of the zaouïas of the medina of Sfax in Tunisia, and headquarters of Aissawa, one of the rites of Sufism.

== Location ==
The mausoleum is located to the south of the medina of Sfax and overlooks three streets: it is bounded on the west by Nahj El Bey (the current Mongi-Slim Street), on the east by Scipion Street and on the north by El Issawiya Street, where the main entrance of the building is found.

== History ==
Due to lack of written documents, the history of this mausoleum remained mysterious for a long time. It is mentioned for the first time in the inventory of monuments made by the students of the Bardo Military School in the middle of the 19th century. According to an epigraphic inscription on the front door, it was built in 1738. Some researchers mention that the prayer room was built even before the rest of the monument, during the Zirids reign (between the 11th and 12th centuries). Initially conceived as a simple oratory, it was transformed in 1863 into a mausoleum named after a local Muslim saint, Sidi Saada Kanoun. Since that date, the monument serves as the headquarters of the Sufi brotherhood of Aïssawa. Sidi Saada mausoleum witnessed several extensions and renovation works.

== Description ==
=== Architecture ===
The mausoleum has the shape of a rectangle measuring 15.10 m long (North-South) and 12.20 m wide (East-West). Originally, it consisted of a rectangular prayer room and by an open courtyard. With the transformation of the building into a zaouïa, the courtyard got annexed to the prayer room, in which, next to the mihrab, stands the burial chamber of Sidi Saada. Next to the main entrance there is a small room for ablutions.

=== Construction mode ===
The monument is built of rubble with lime mortar. Its wooden joists roof is supported by semicircular arches, supported by squared columns with capitals of Zirid and Hispano-Maghrebi origin.

=== Main facade ===
Access to the monument is through a carved wooden door located in a richly decorated stone frame (moldings, geometric and floral motifs, earthenware tiles, epigraphic inscription, etc.). On either side of the entrance door, there are two symmetrical wrought iron windows with stone framing.

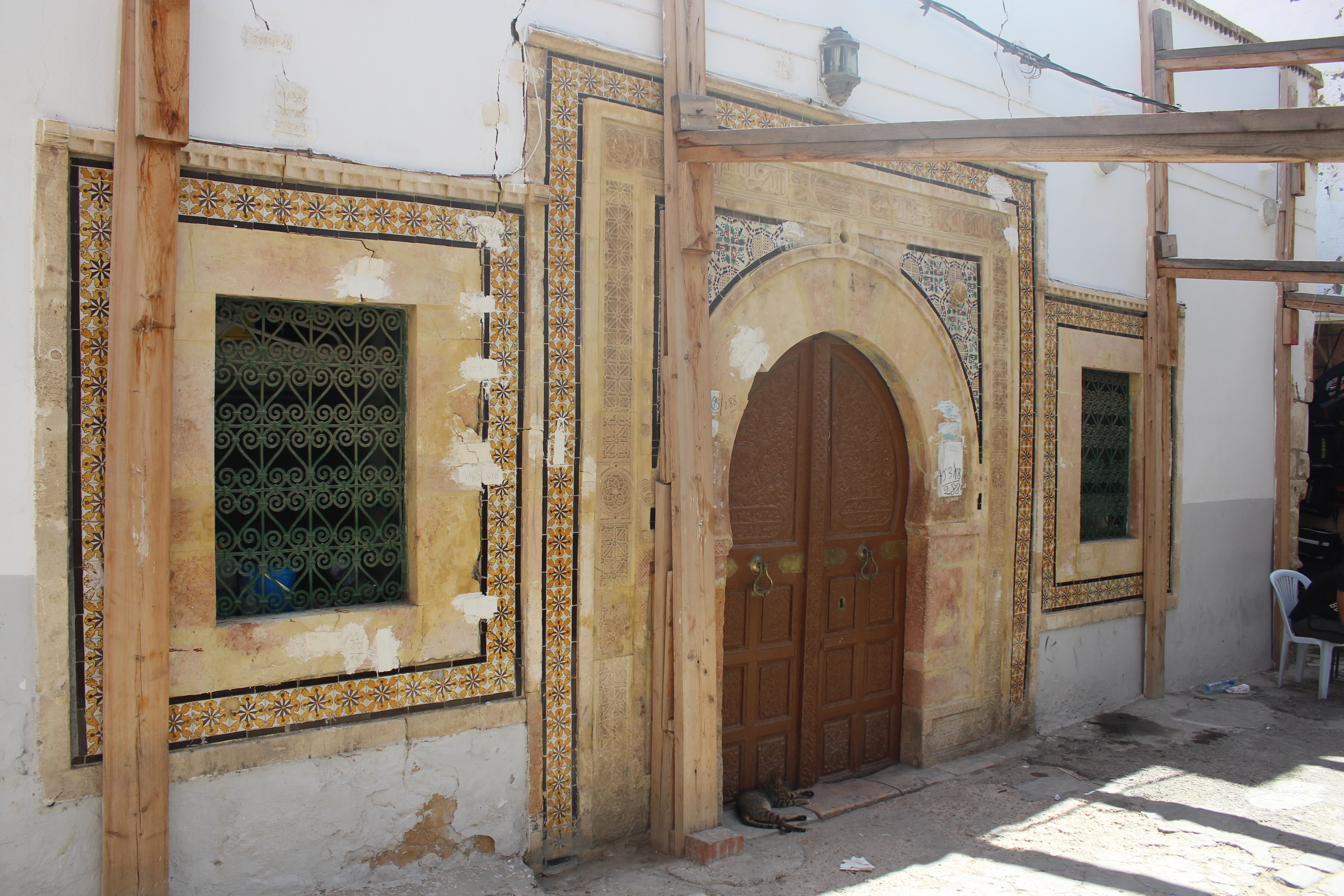
The mausoleum's facade being restored

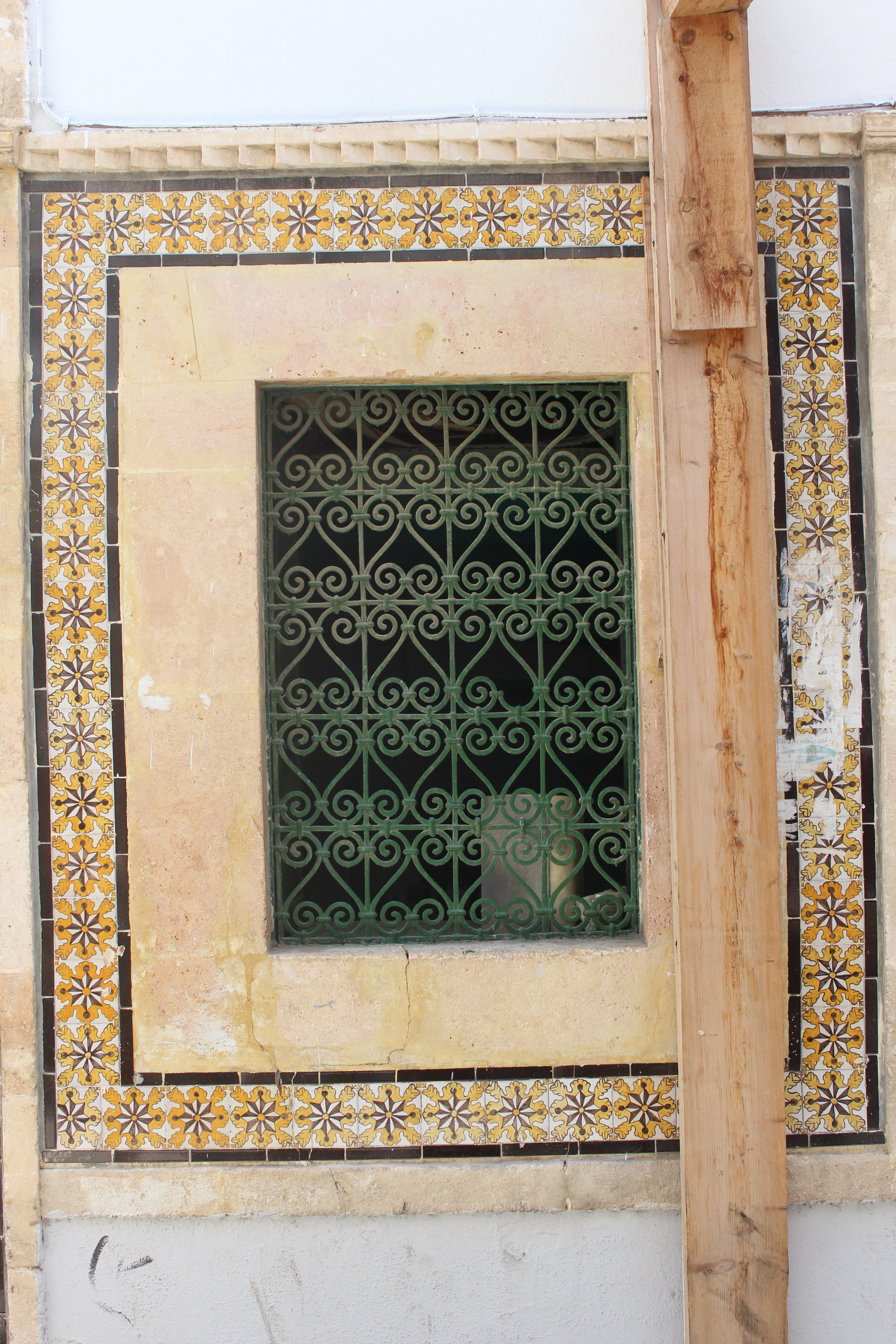
Window of the mausoleum
