= Hammam El Soltane =

Hammam in Tunisia

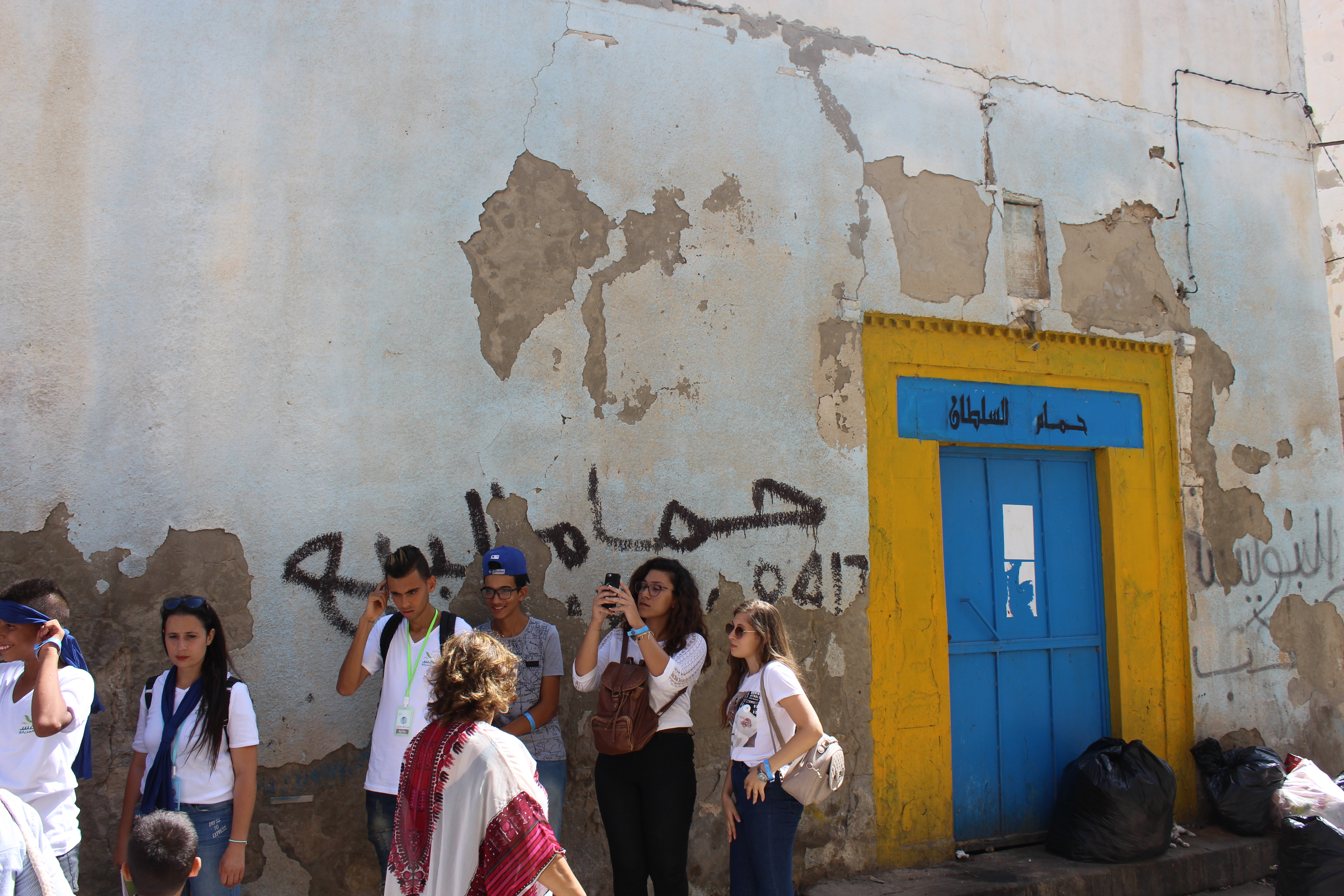
Facade of Hammam Al Sultan

Hammam El Soltane (Arabic: حمام السلطان), literally "Sultan's bath", is one of the most famous hammams in the medina of Sfax. Currently not functioning, it is at risk of being demolished.

== Location ==
The hammam is in the eastern part of the medina in Sfax near Sidi Lakhmi mosque and Dar Jellouli Museum. It overlooks Driba Street.

== History ==
The written sources do not retain an exact date for the construction of this hammam. Nevertheless, an epigraphic inscription at the entrance of the building commemorates the restoration of the monument by the master Mohamed El Kotti in 1649 during the Muradid Dynasty. Some historians suggest that the building was founded during the Aghlabid reign.

The same source mentions the existence of a secret underground passage between the hammam and Dar Essebii, the house of one of the former governors of the city of Sfax.

== Etymology ==
The hammam got its name from the fact that two former governors of the city were murdered in it: Mansour al-Barghouati in the middle of the 11th century and Umar al-Hafsi at the end of the 14th century.

== Description ==
The entrance opens on a small vestibule, which gives access to the cells of the hammam.

The main room is square, with each side 6.5 meters long. There is a central dome and barrel vaults on both sides. The dome is of tripartite composition, consisting of a rectangular base, an octagonal drum and a hemispherical cap. The vaults, oriented north–south, are over 14 meters long and 4 meters wide.

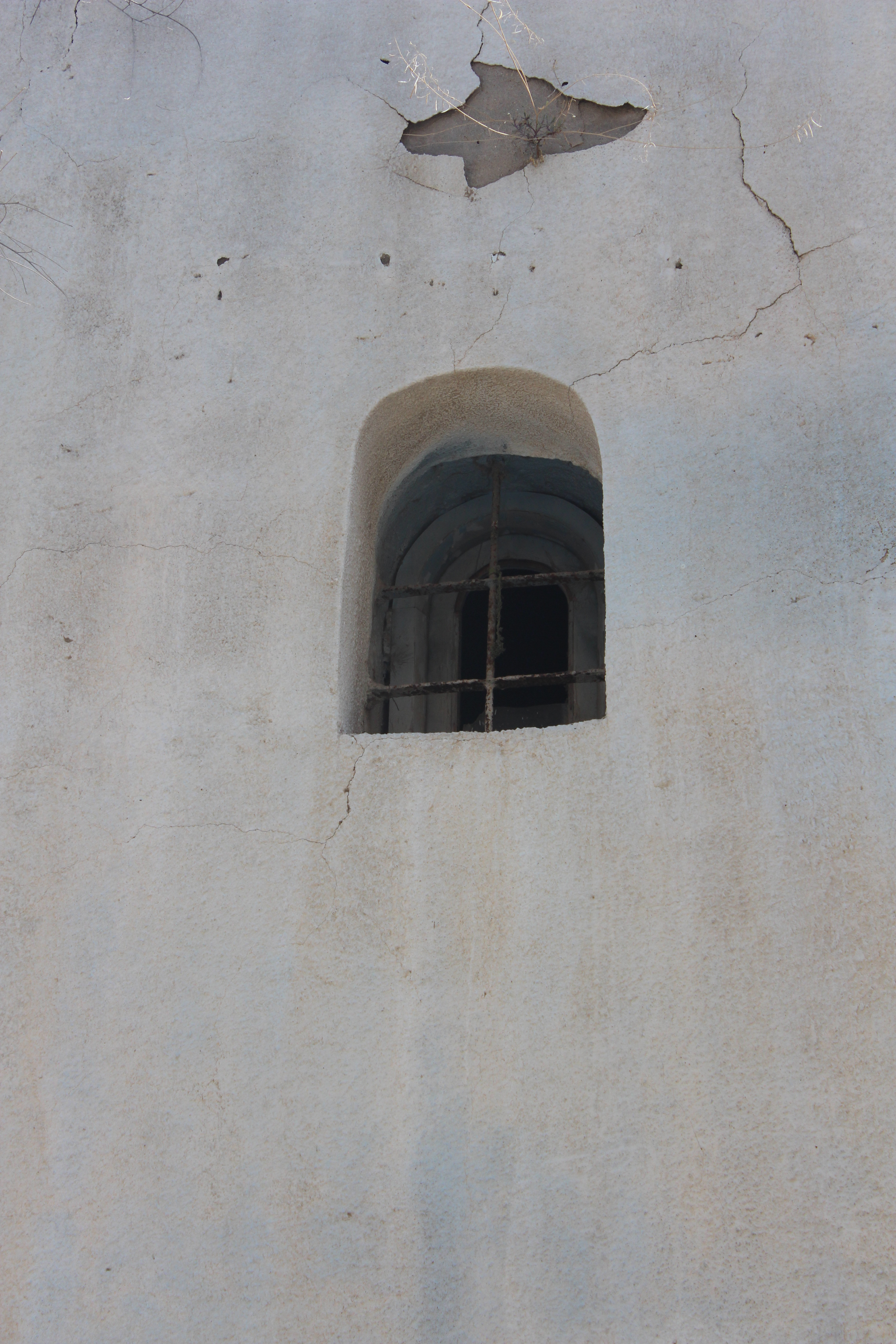
Window of the hammam

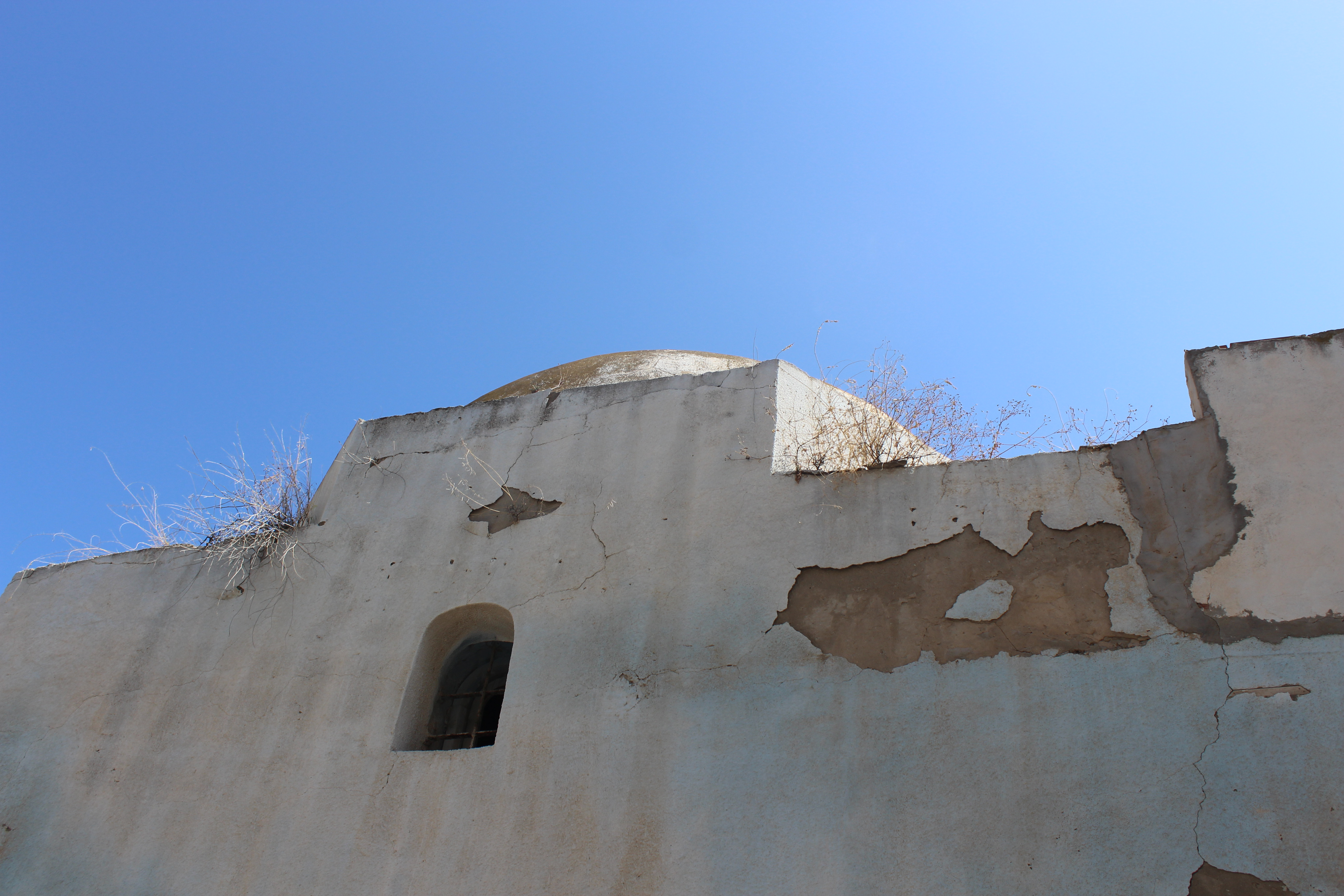
Dome of the Hammam
