= Souk El Hout =

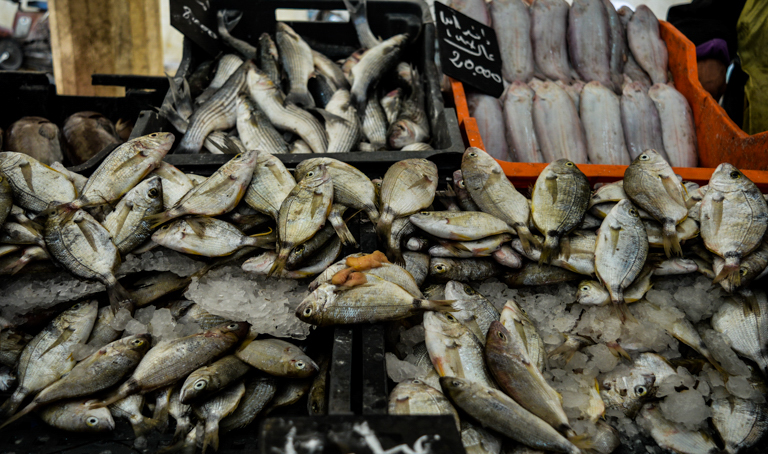

Souk El Hout (Arabic: سوق الحوت), or the Fish Market, is one of the most popular markets in the medina of Sfax because of all of the different kinds of fish that can be bought there.

== History ==
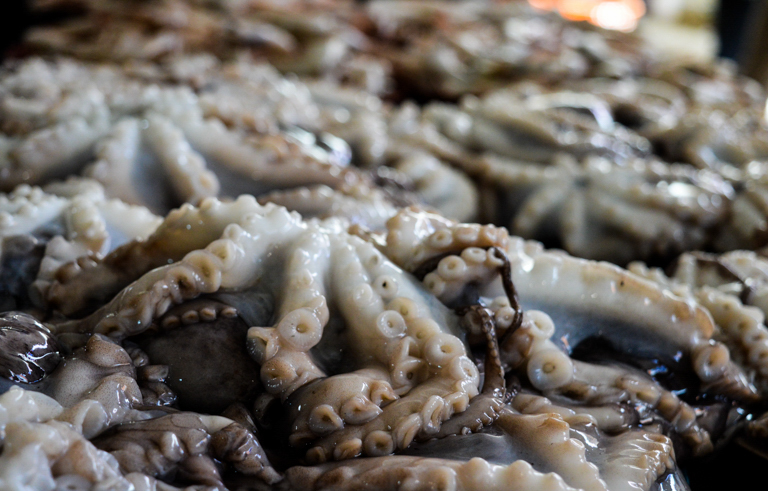

The first fish market in Sfax was located in the inner court of Beb Diwan where fish was sold under the silo of the Oldster Mosque. This Souk in particular kept getting bigger gradually until it extended to the path of the Great Mosque of Sfax. Some of the fishermen used to sleep over in the Souk in cabins and tents; that is why it stayed in the same primitive form until 1952 and 1953, when the current souk was built instead of Souk El Tebn.

== Architecture ==
It has one main door that contains three openings and multiple side doors.
