= Souk El Kamour =

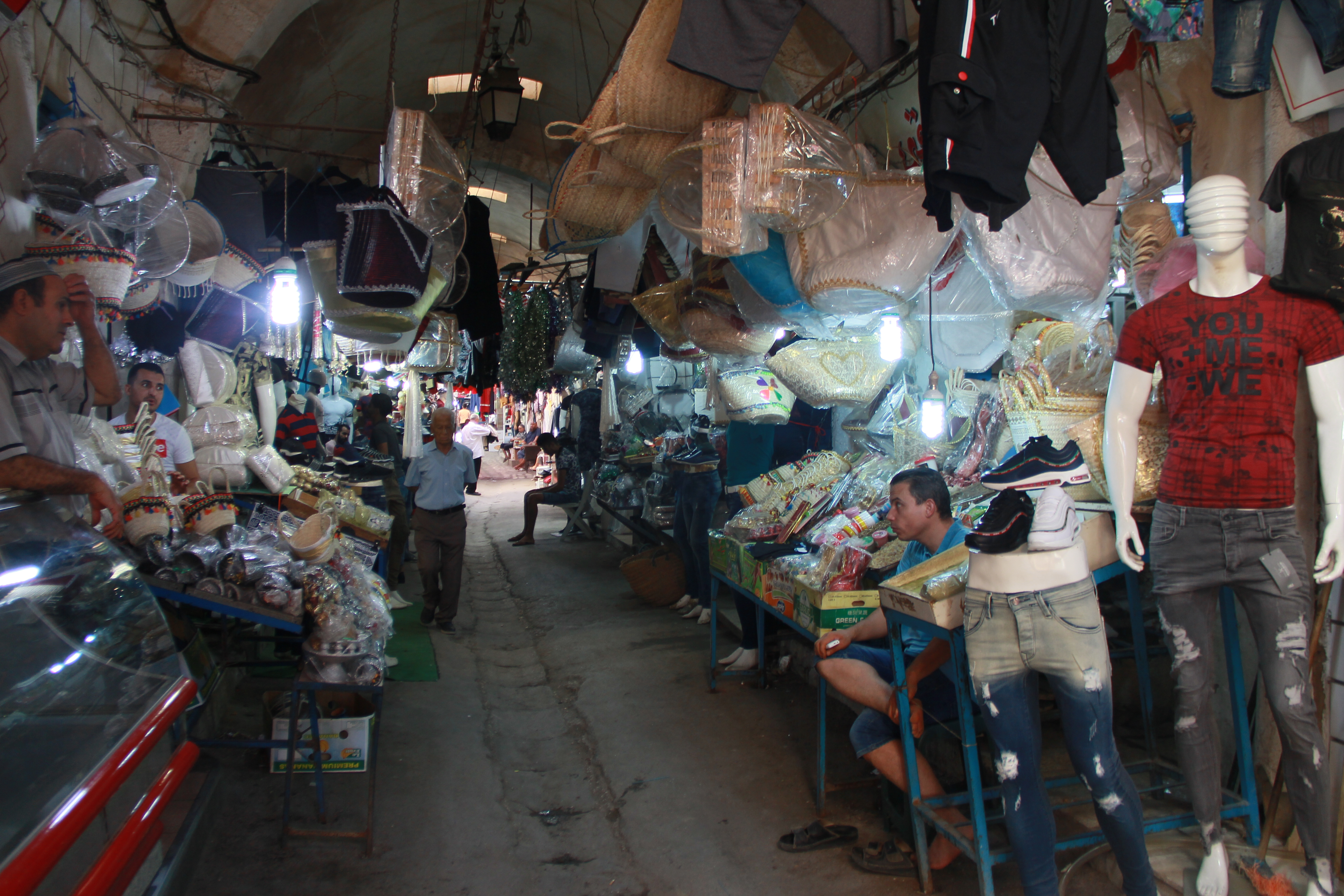
Souk El Kamour

Souk El Kamour (Arabic:سوق الكامور) or the spices market is one of the most important and oldest souks of the medina of Sfax.

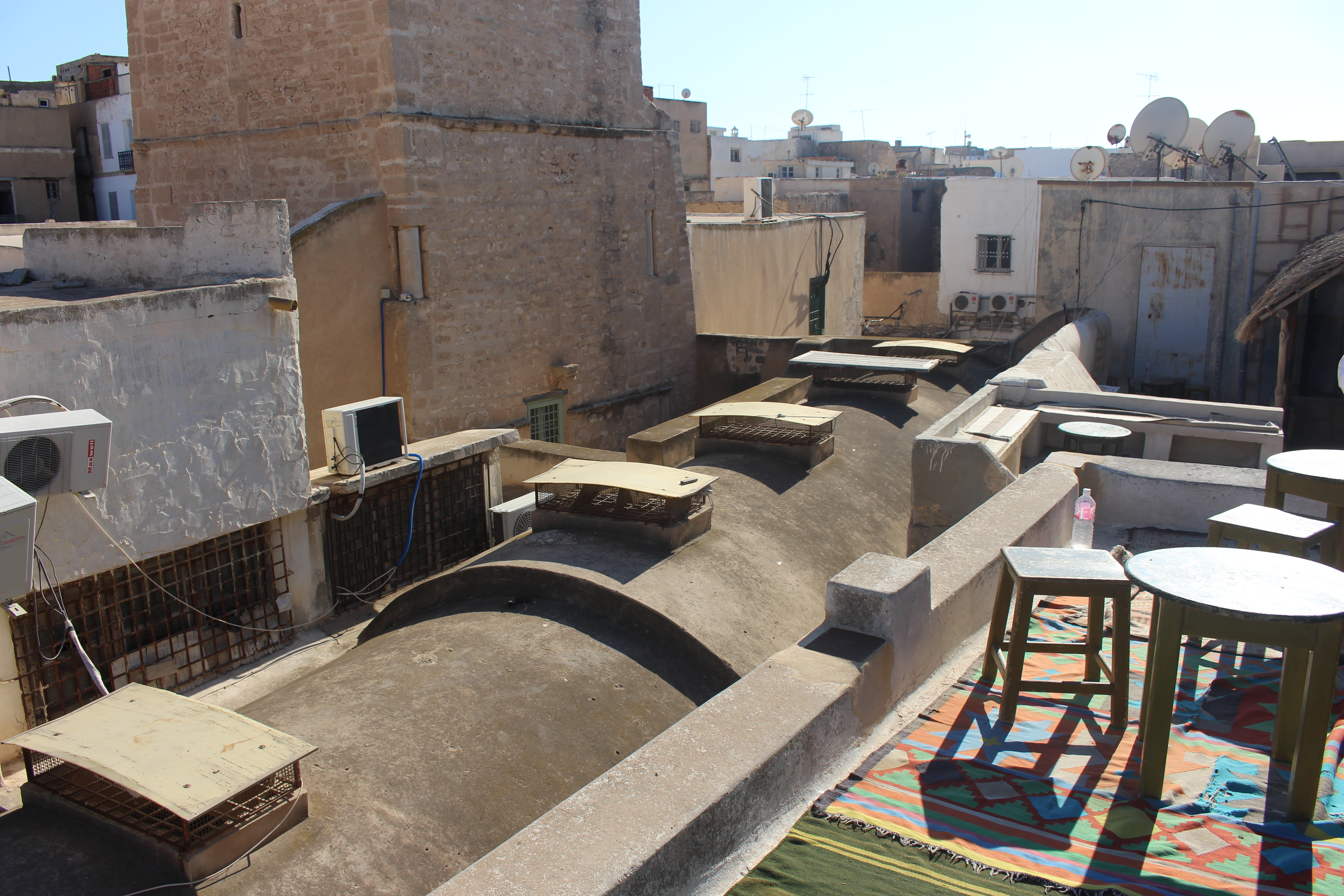
Souk El Kamour's roof

== Etymology ==
The souk got its name probably from its special architecture. Its streets are covered with a barrel vault called Kamr in Arabic.

== Description ==
Backed by the northern facade of the Great Mosque, the souk stretches along an east–west axis, perpendicular to the main wing of the souk Errbaa.

According to some historians, this market was specialized in selling spices and sfaxian natural products (raisins, almonds, pistachios, dried figs etc.).

Nowadays, most of his shops got converted into modern ones where new products that are mainly imported are exposed to the sale (clothes, bags, etc.).
