= Souk Erbaa (Sfax) =

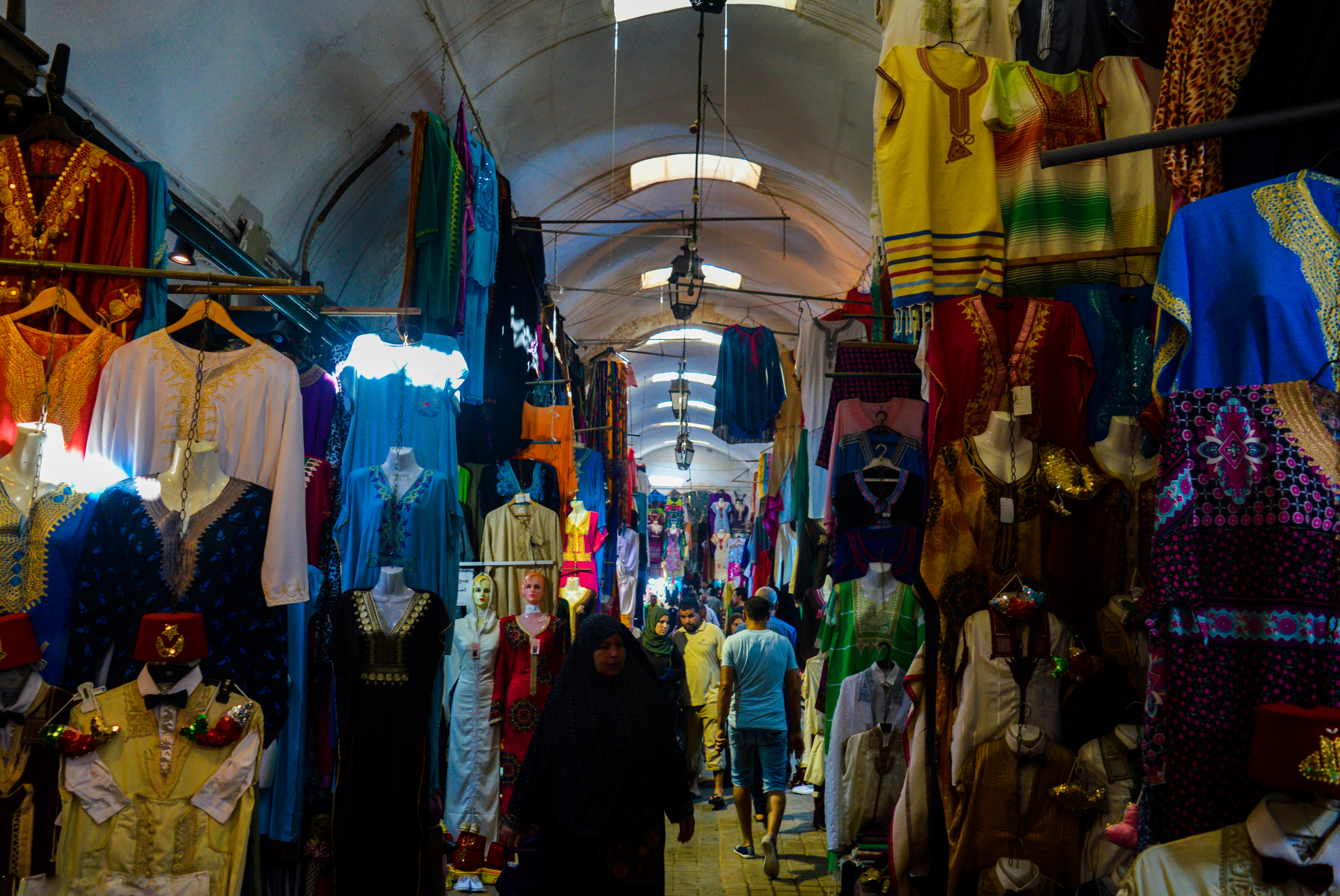
Souk Erbaa Sfax

Souk Erbaa (Arabic: سوق الربع), also known as Souk El Rhadra (Arabic: سوق الرهادرة), is one of the oldest souks of the medina of Sfax, Tunisia.

== History ==
This market was founded during the Aghlabid reign in the 9th century, witnessed many changes through the centuries but kept its distinguishing feature since its creation as totally covered. The current state goes back to the Tunisian independence period.

For decades, this souk was exclusive for the nobles of Sfax and its rich citizens because of the type and quality of its products. Till this day, its merchants belong to the noble society of the community (which is not only related to wealth level), that's why, apart from its economic role, Souk Erbaa had a social one as a meeting place.

== Etymology ==
It got its appellation from the position in which the merchants used to sit, in the lotus position, because of the high altitude of their shops.

Some historians believe the Erbaa naming came from the fact that the products there used to be sold for the quarter of its original price.

== Locale ==
Adjoining the oratory-cathedral, the cruciform Souk Erbaa occupies the whole territory from the north of the old city to its south, linking Souk El Sabbagine to Souk El Kamour. It is crossed in its middle by Souk El Attarine that is composed of two old Souks: Souk El Hannatine in the east, and Souk Erbaa Esghir in the west.

== Description ==
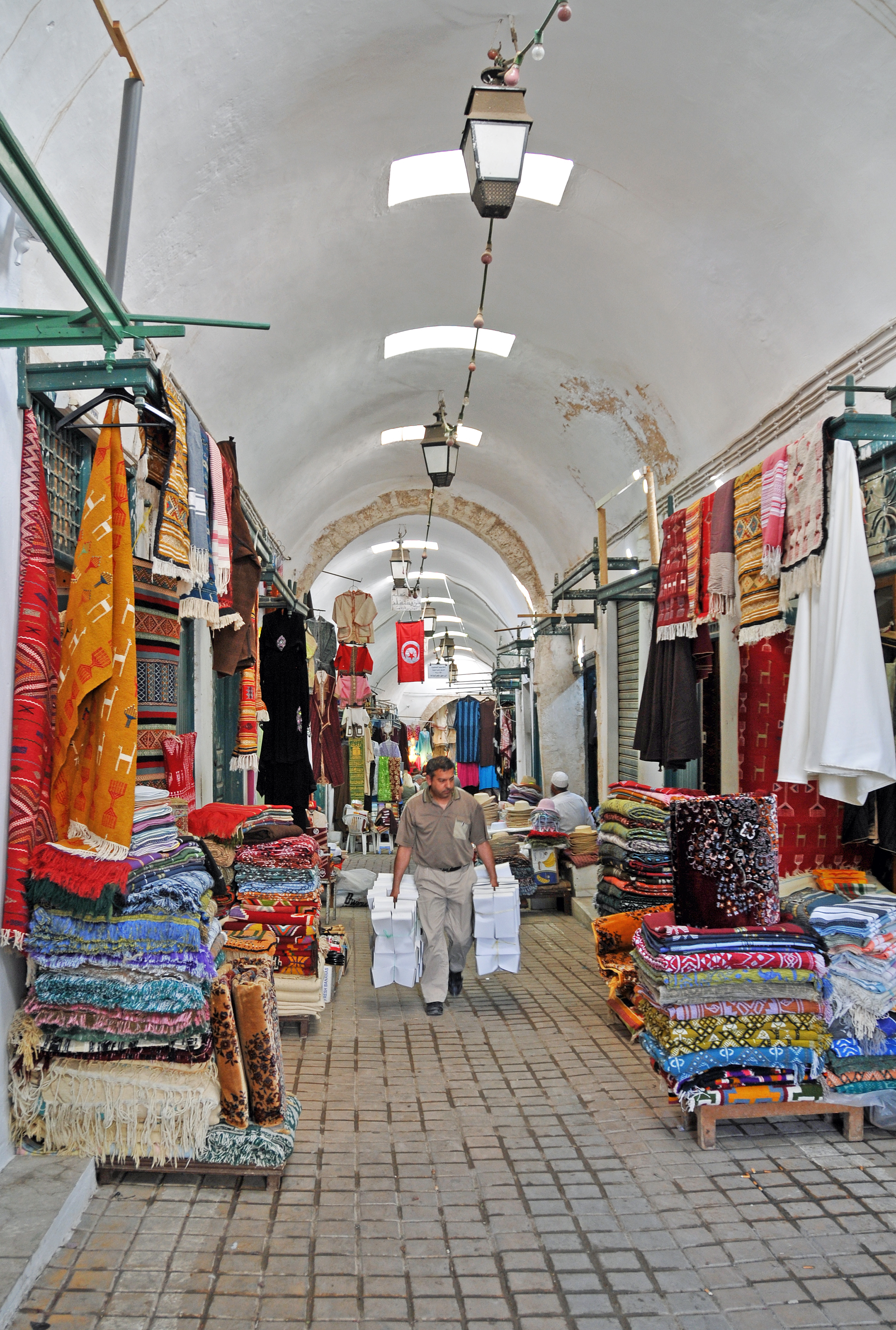
Alley of Souk Erbaa

According to a study conducted by Gdoura Mahmoud in 1982, the souk occupies a surface of 2000. It is composed of two rows of small 120 shops in total, with a ceiling made of stone and plaster arches. It is linked to Souk El Balghajine by a small eastern alley that used to be called Farkha during the 9th century, and that has two doors: the first in Souk Erbaa while the second is located in Souk El Balghajine (also known as Souk El Okba).

Souk Erbaa is composed of three markets: Souk Erbaa El Wesaa (the wide Souk Erbaa) in the east and Souk Erbaa El sghir (the small Souk Erbaa) and Souk Erbaa Thayak (the tight Souk Erbaa) in the west.

Souk Erbaa El Thayak that was basically a storage place for animals feed, and then for the animals themselves. Afterwards, it became a place for textile trading.

The rest of the Souk was specialized in the wool products (laffa) trading (coats, blankets, chechias, margoums, etc.). Also, it was the trading place for Syrian products (saya).
