= Souk El Omrane =

Souk El Omrane (Arabic : سوق العمران ) is one of the markets of Bab Jebli in the medina of Sfax.

== Localization ==
The souk was located right next to the path that passes from the west of the medina.

== History ==
Souk El Omrane was originally a grave yard that was later on transformed to a warehouse for graves called as "The Hotel Of Coffins".

In 1949, the Islamic Association of Conserving Graveyards transformed it into a souk specialized in selling grains and oils. All of the souk's income were dedicated for the restoration of the graveyard's fences.
