= Souk El Haddadine (Sfax) =

Coordinates: 34°44′14″N 10°45′36″E

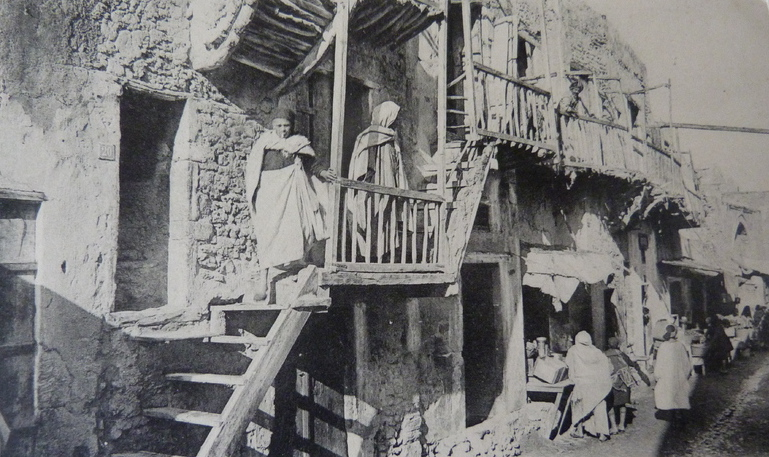
Picture of Souk El Haddadine from an undated postcard.

Souk El Haddadine (Arabic: سوق الحدادين), also called the Market of Blacksmiths or Souk El Haddadine and El Najjarine, or the Market of Blacksmiths and Joiners, is one of the souks, or markets, of the medina of Sfax, Tunisia.

== Localization ==
The souk is located near Bab Jebli in the East and takes a turn with the start of Nahj El Bey (Alley of the Bey).

== History ==
It used to be joined in one part but got divided later on into two separate parts : one for Blacksmiths and the other for Joiners like it still is today along with some other changes.

A joiner in the tradition of the medina of Sfax is someone who chops the wood from olive trees and other similar ones to create agricultural machines and eating bowls and other bigger eating bowls called Mithrad.
